= Kingdom of Acre, 1192–1291 =

Kingdom of Acre
- Part of the Crusades
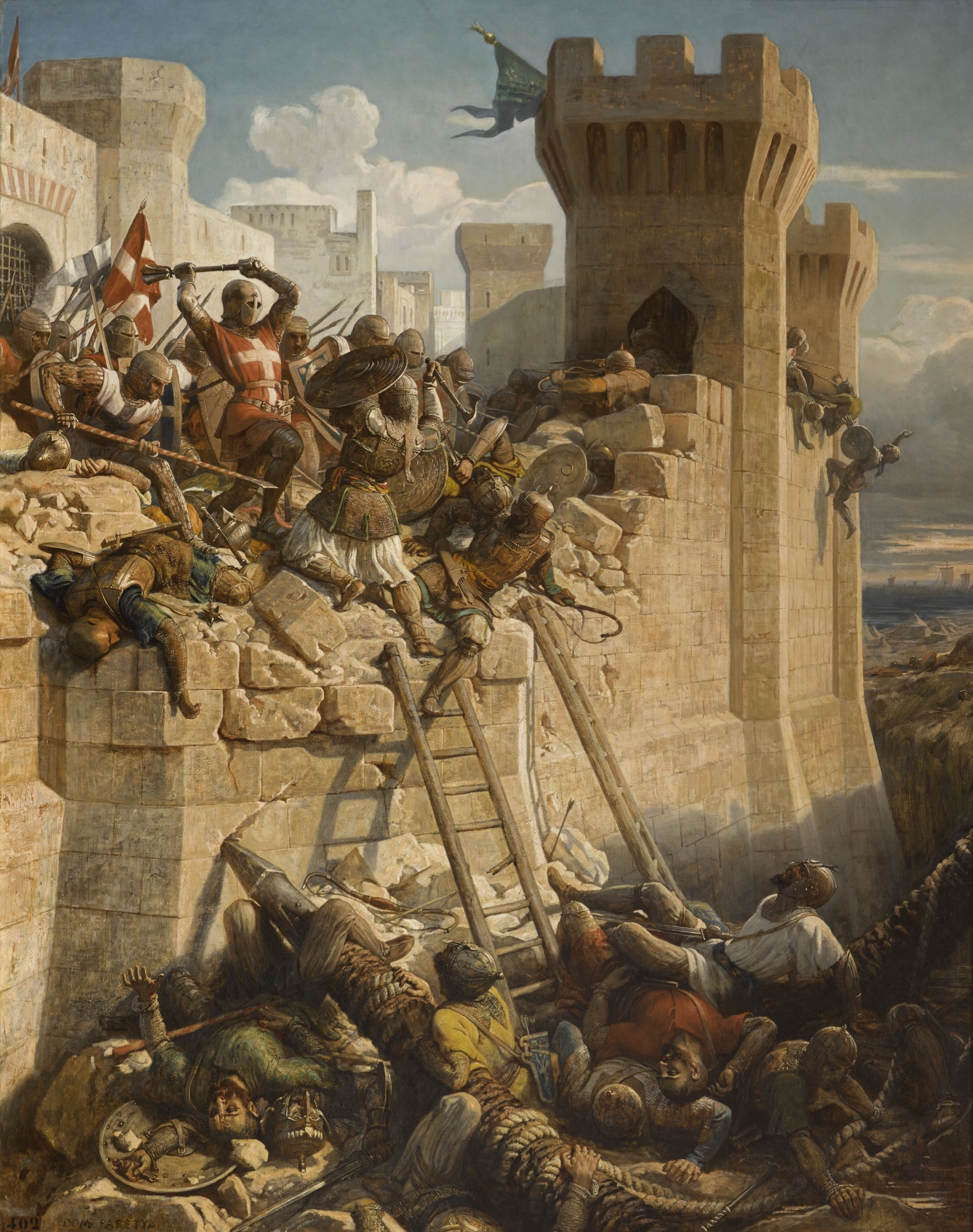
- The Siege of Acre
Date	1192–1291
Location	Levant
Result	Mamluk victory; End of the Crusades in the Levant
Territorial changes	The Muslims capture all Frankish possessions in the Holy Land

Belligerents
Monarchs of Jerusalem; Sibylla of Jerusalem; Guy of Lusignan; Isabella I of Jerusalem; Conrad of Montferrat; Henry II of Champagne; Aimery of Cyprus; Maria of Montferrat; John of Brienne; Isabella II of Jerusalem; Frederick II of Germany; Conrad II of Jerusalem; Conradin; Hugh III of Cyprus; John I of Cyprus; Henry II of Cyprus; Kingdom of Cyprus; Hugh I of Cyprus; Walter of Montbéliard; Henry I of Cyprus; Alice of Champagne; Ralph of Soissons; Plaisance of Antioch; Isabella of Cyprus	Ayyubid sultans Saladin; Al-Adil I Al-Kamil; Al-Adil II; As-Salih Ayyub; Turanshah; Shajar al-Durr; Al-Ashraf Musa; Mamluk sultans Shajar al-Durr; Aybak; Al-Mansur Ali; Qutuz; Baibars; Al-Said Barakah; Solamish; Qalawun; Al-Ashraf Khalil; Abbasid caliphs Al-Mustansir I Al-Musta'sim; Al-Mustansir II; Al-Hakim I

Commanders and leaders
Crusade nobles Richard the Lionheart; Henry VI of Germany; Andrew II of Hungary; Pelagio Galvani; Theobald I of Navarre; Richard of Cornwall; Louis IX of France; James I of Aragon; Lord Edward; Acre; Albert of Vercelli; James of Vitry; Richard Filangieri; Odo of Montbéliard; Thomas of Aquino; Robert of Nantes; Walter of Brienne; John of Arsuf; Geoffrey of Sergines; Roger of San Severino; Jean I de Grailly; Otto de Grandson; Nicholas of Hanapes; Antioch; Bohemond III of Antioch; Aimery of Limoges; Bohemond IV of Antioch; Raymond-Roupen; Bohemond V of Antioch; Bohemond VI of Antioch; Tripoli; Raymond IV of Tripoli; Bohemond of Botron; William of Botron; Bohemond VII of Antioch; Bartholomew Mansel; Paul of Segni; Guy II Embriaco; Lucia of Tripoli; Peter Embriaco; Beirut; John, Old Lord of Beirut; Balian, Lord of Beirut; Eschiva of Beirut; Tyre; Philip of Montfort; Joscius; John of Montfort; Margaret of Tyre; Amalric of Tyre; Armenia; Leo I of Armenia; Alice of Armenia; Hethum I of Armenia; Sempad the Constable; Leo II of Armenia; Sibylla of Armenia; Georgia; Demetrius II of Georgia	Ayyubids; Keukbori; Al-Ashraf Musa ibn Adil; An-Nasir Dawud; Al-Salih Ismail; Al-Mansur Ibrahim; Fakhr al-Din; An-Nasir Muhammad; Al-Ashraf Musa; Al-Mansur II Muhammad; Mamluks; An-Nasir Yusuf; Faris al-Din Aktay; Sayf al-Din Salar; Shafi' bin Ali el-Masry; Seljuks; Kaykaus II; Kilij Arslan IV; Mu'in al-Din Parwana; Mongols; Ögedei Khan; Baiju Noyan; Eljigidei; Güyük Khan; Oghul Qaimish; Möngke Khan; Berke; Hulegu Khan; Kitbuqa; Abaqa Khan; Möngke Temür; Hafsids; Muhammad I al-Mustansir; Makuria; David of Makuria _______________; Envoys to the Mongols; John of Plano Carpini; Ascelin of Lombardy; André de Longjumeau; William of Rubruck; Kingdom of Sicily; Charles I of Anjou; Manfred of Sicily; Genoa/Pisa/Venice; Enrico Dandolo; Benedetto I Zaccaria; Templars; Gerard of Ridefort; Robert IV of Sablé; Armand de Périgord; Guillaume de Beaujeu; Jacques de Molay; Hospitallers; Guillaume de Chateauneuf; Nicolas Lorgne; Matthew of Clermont; Teutonic Knights; Hermann von Salza

The Kingdom of Acre, or the Second Kingdom of Jerusalem, was formed in 1192 after the Third Crusade and lasted until 1291 when the city of Acre was overrun by Muslim forces. The fall of Jerusalem in 1187 led to the Crusade, which failed to recover the Holy City. The seat of government of the kingdom was moved to Acre. After the death of Saladin, his Ayyubid dynasty was weakened by in-fighting and poor leadership, and was replaced by the Mamluk sultanate in 1250. The invasion of the Mongols complicated the situation for both the Franks and the Mamluks.

The period after the Third Crusade was marked by seven major crusades and several minor ones. Of these, the Sixth Crusade resulted in the recovery of Jerusalem, but Acre remained the capital of the kingdom. The results of the Barons' Crusade in 1241 had the kingdom the largest since 1187, but Jerusalem was lost forever in 1244. The sultan Baibars took power in 1260, and he and his successors waged fierce campaigns against the Franks and the Mongols that led to the fall of Acre in 1291. Crusading continued for centuries, but the West's presence in the Holy Land was gone.

== Recovery of the kingdom, 1192–1202 ==
Between the time that Jerusalem was lost in 1187 until the recovery of Acre in 1191, the kingdom was essentially running on autopilot. Its capital was occupied and her king imprisoned. Antioch to the north was in chaos. Only Tripoli and Tyre were unaffected, and the kingdom gradually recovered over the next decade despite competing claims to the throne.

=== A year with three kings ===
The kingdom suffered from a lack of clear leadership throughout the latter part of the twelfth century. The tradition of warrior-kings had ended with the brothers Baldwin III and Amalric. The rule of the leper Baldwin IV and the boy-king Baldwin V was fraught with in-fighting. Following the latter's death in 1186, his mother Sibylla was the rightful heir, but there was a problem concerning her unpopular husband Guy of Lusignan. She had been offered the crown under the condition that she divorce Guy, and she wisely added a proviso that allowed her to select her next husband. Upon being crowned in mid-September 1186, she immediately chose to remarry Guy and crowned him herself.

By 1183, Saladin had consolidated his position in Egypt and Syria, and he began his offensive against the Franks. Their seminal defeat at Hattin in July 1187 soon led to the fall of Jerusalem three months later. Guy was Saladin's prisoner and Sibylla was in Tripoli. The only major city remaining in the kingdom was Tyre, defended by Conrad of Montferrat, the brother of Sibylla's first husband William Longsword.

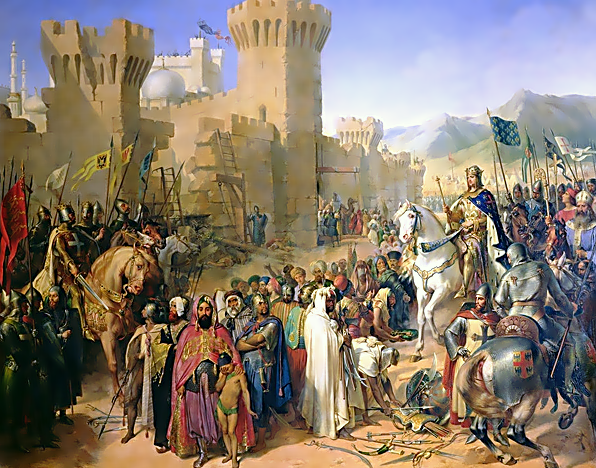
A 19th-century depiction of the Acre's surrender to Philip in 1191

After Guy was released in 1188, he joined his wife in Tripoli and travelled to Tyre, amassing an army on his way that included Gerard of Ridefort, grand master of the Templars. The king and queen were denied entry into Tyre by Conrad, and they awaited there for months. In 1189, Guy and his army began the Siege of Acre, awaiting the vanguard of the Third Crusade. Sibylla joined Guy in his siege, but died there on 25 July 1190 during an epidemic. At that point, Conrad laid claim to the throne, marrying Sibylla's half-sister Isabella I to bolster his claim.

As the Crusade wound down, Phillip II of France returned home, leaving French forces under the command of Hugh III of Burgundy. The English king Richard the Lionheart remained in overall command of the Christian forces. Hugh supported Conrad's claim to the throne as opposed to Richard's support for Guy.

Richard was anxious to return to England to deal with the royal ambitions of his rebellious brother John Lackland and so he garnered a compromise. Guy would resign and in exchange was granted the lordship of the Kingdom of Cyprus. On 16 April 1192, Richard convened a council of nobles and prelates and Conrad was unanimously elected as the new king. Unfortunately, he was felled by an Assassin's blade on 28 April. Both Richard and Saladin were suspected as being behind the murder, but the crime was never solved.

The Third Crusade saw the Christians recover a narrow coastal strip for their kingdom.

Richard's nephew Henry II of Champagne married the widow Isabella, then pregnant with Conrad's child. He became lord of Jerusalem jure uxoris on 5 May 1192 but was never crowned as king. Despite his hasty selection as ruler, Henry was lauded for ending the conflicts extant since the reign of Baldwin IV that had hampered Christian efforts against the Muslims.

On 2 September 1192, Richard and Saladin finalized the Treaty of Jaffa, which recognized Muslim control over Jerusalem but allowed unarmed Christian pilgrims and merchants to visit the city. Richard departed the Holy Land on 9 October 1192 due to mounting threats to his rule back in Europe. The military successes of the Third Crusade allowed the Christians to maintain considerable states in Cyprus and on the Syrian coast, restoring the kingdom on a narrow strip from Tyre to Jaffa.

=== Death of Saladin ===
The Christian victory at the Battle of Jaffa in August 1192 had been the last major encounter between the Crusaders and Saladin, and the ensuing treaty left Christian–Muslim relations in the Holy Land at a standstill. Henry and Saladin signed a five-year truce later that year and Bohemond III of Antioch concluded a ten-year truce at the same time. Saladin died on 4 March 1193 and was buried in the Mausoleum of Saladin in Damascus. He died almost penniless, having given away what was a great fortune.

The death of the sultan who dominated the affairs of Egypt and Syria for decades fractured the Ayyubid dynasty. The region would be for the most part under the control of Saladin's sons. His eldest, al-Afdal aged 22, ruled in Damascus. The next son was al-Aziz Uthman, already proclaimed as sultan of Egypt. Their brother al-Zahir Ghazi ruled Aleppo. None appeared eager to lose their independence. Two of Saladin's brother survived him. They were al-Adil I whose ambitions were not trusted by Saladin and Tughtakin who ruled Yemen.

Beginning in May 1194, quarrels between al-Afdal and al-Aziz surfaced and were mediated by al-Adil, a neutral third party. It was clear that al-Afdal was unfit to rule and in July 1196, al-Aziz and al-Adil overthrew al-Afdal and the former was recognized as supreme sultan of the dynasty and the latter ruler of Damascus. When al-Aziz died in November 1198, his ministers summoned al-Afdal to Cairo to be regent to al-Aziz's twelve-year-old son.

Al-Afdal and al-Zahir joined forces to attack Damascus, besieging al-Adil for six months. Al-Adil gained allies among the various family members and the arrival in January 1200 of an army led by his son al-Kamil tipped the balance. He chased al-Afdal back to Egypt, defeating him at Bilbeis and sending him once again into exile. Al-Adil was now sultan of Egypt. But again his nephews rejoined and attacked the new sultan, but were soundly defeated. By 4 August 1200, al-Adil controlled all of Saladin's domain and was sultan of Egypt and Syria. His sons were installed in key positions: al-Kamil in Egypt, al-Mu'azzam in Damascus, and al-Ashraf in the Jazira.

=== Antioch and Cilician Armenia ===
In 1194, Bohemond III was in dispute with Cilician Armenia, a vassal state of Antioch since the early 1180s. Leo I of Armenia seized the strategically important fortress of Bagras after Saladin abandoned it and Bohemond demanded its return. Leo had long sought independence from Antiochene authority, and after Saladin's death in 1193, Leo invited Bohemond to Bagras to negotiate the dispute. Instead, Bohemond was captured and taken to Sis, the Armenian capital.

Leo then tried to use his prisoner to take Antioch itself. Under pressure, Bohemond agreed to surrender the principality, and Armenian troops entered Antioch. But the city's Greek and Latin merchants and citizens resisted. Led by Latin patriarch Aimery of Limoges, they expelled the Armenian troops and established the Commune of Antioch, recognizing Bohemond's eldest son, Raymond IV, as regent during the imprisonment of his father. Bohemond's younger son, Bohemond IV, then count of Tripoli, also hurried to Antioch with troops. The resistance prevented Leo from taking control of the city.

The crisis was finally settled through the intervention of Henry II. In the resulting agreement, Bohemond was released after renouncing Antioch's suzerainty over Cilicia and accepting Leo's possession of Bagras. As part of the reconciliation, Raymond married Alice of Armenia, Leo's niece and heir presumptive. The marriage was particularly important because their future son, Raymond-Roupen, would later become the focus of a bitter succession struggle for Antioch.

=== Aimery of Cyprus ===
Guy's younger brother Aimery of Lusignan was constable of Jerusalem and lord of Jaffa when he fell into disagreement with Henry II. The Pisans, long involved in the kingdom, were old allies of the Lusignan family and in May 1193, Henry learned that they were planning to install Guy in Tyre.

Expelling the Pisans, Henry charged Aimery with complicity in the affair and jailed him. Intervention by the local barons, the Templars and the Hospitallers got him released and he was exiled to Cyprus. When Guy died late in 1194, his brother was elected first as lord and, in 1196, as king. Aimery of Cyprus was then certified by the Holy Roman Emperor Henry VI of Germany.

On 10 September 1197, Henry fell out of a window in his palace at Acre and died. A marriage of his widow Isabella to Aimery was hastily arranged that October despite the patriarch Aymar the Monk's objections. Aimery was crowned king of Jerusalem in January 1198.

=== Crusade of 1197 ===
The Franks had failed to prevent the fall of Jerusalem and the English and French expedition ended in 1192 with the Holy city still in Muslim hands. The five-year truce ended in 1197 and the Franks lost Jaffa in their second encounter there, yielding the city to the Ayyubids. Emperor Henry VI thought the Germans could do better and launched the Crusade of 1197. Henry intended to lead the expedition himself, but political circumstances did not allow it and he sent a large German force ahead under the leadership of Conrad of Mainz, Henry I of Brabant, and Frederick I of Austria.

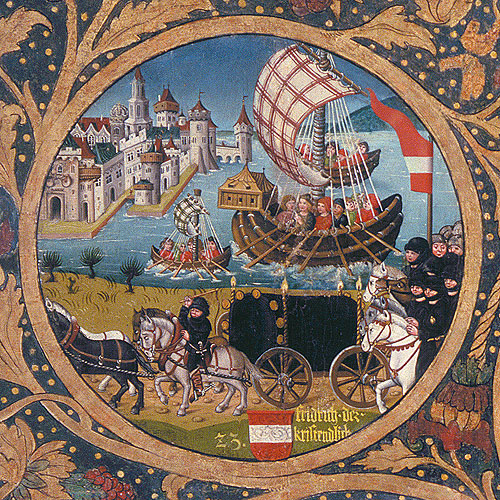
Frederick of Austria sails to the Holy Land, Klosterneuburg Monastery, c. 1490

The Crusaders reached the Holy Land in the autumn of 1197 and initially achieved some modicum of success. Facing the German forces with little support from Aleppo and Damascus, the governors of the cities of Sidon and Beirut abandoned their fortresses, strengthening the Christian positions along the coast. They also raided inland areas and threatened territories controlled by the Ayyubid rulers. The crusaders benefited from divisions among Saladin's successors who were struggling among themselves to control his former empire.

Henry VI died unexpectedly on 28 September 1197, at only thirty-two years of age, the same day that the Germans began their Siege of Toron. When the news of the emperor's death reached the Holy Land, many of the German nobles left the battlefield for home, as Henry's death created a major succession crisis in the empire. Those remaining continued the siege until 2 February 1198 when a Muslim relieving force arrived, causing them to withdraw. The crusade was over before it really began.

=== War of the Antiochene Succession ===
The kingdoms of Jerusalem and Cyprus showed a degree of stability under Aimery. However, Antioch to the north was in chaos beginning with the death of Bohemond III in April 1201, beginning a succession crisis. Bohemond IV, seized Antioch and claimed the principality, but Raymond-Roupen also had a strong hereditary claim. Bohemond IV was championed by the Templars and Hospitallers, and al-Zahir of Aleppo also promised support. Raymond-Roupen was supported by his grandfather Leo I, who sought to place him on the throne and expand Armenian influence over Antioch.

The conflict continued intermittently for nearly two decades. Leo I and Raymond-Roupen captured Antioch at various times, but Bohemond repeatedly regained control. The struggle involved not only the rival princes but also Armenia, the Templars, the Antiochene nobility, and the city's commune. The commune became particularly important because many Antiochenes opposed Armenian domination and preferred Bohemond. In 1216, Leo finally succeeded in installing Raymond-Roupen as ruler, but the new prince failed to consolidate his authority.

In 1219, the people of Antioch opened the city to Bohemond, forcing Raymond-Roupen to flee. He died in 1222, effectively ending his claim. Bohemond IV emerged as the undisputed ruler of Antioch and Tripoli. The war weakened Antioch and diverted resources from the struggle against Muslim powers, while also demonstrating the growing importance of Cilicia and its Armenian rulers in the politics of the Crusader states.

=== Military Orders ===
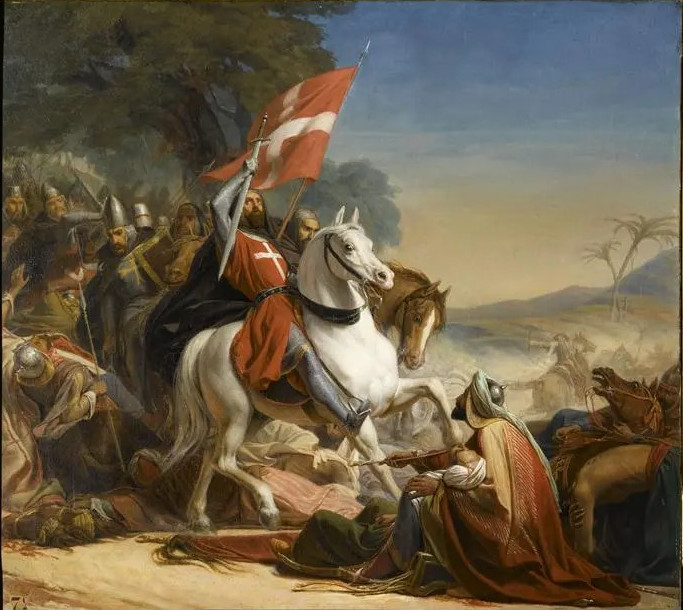
Défense de la Celesyrie par Raymond du Puy, by Édouard Cibot in the Salles des Croisades at Château de Versailles.

The three major Military Orders would play an outsized role in the governance and defense of the kingdom in the thirteenth century. Other lesser known orders also participated to a certain extent. Although their rivalries were at times a detriment, their strong funding and stable force of trained knights were unsurpassed.

The Hospitallers, founded in the late eleventh century to aid pilgrims to the Holy Land, were transformed to include a military mission by grand master Raymond du Puy in the mid-twelfth century. They concentrated their strength through a series of castles, mostly in the County of Tripoli. Having lost most of their fortresses in Saladin's sweep of the Holy Land, they set about in 1203 to restore their properties. Many of the Hospitaller castles were recovered. Operating from Krak des Chevaliers and al-Marqab, they repeatedly failed to recapture Montferrand, then held by Aleppo, until arbitrated by the Templars.

The Templars were founded in 1119 and became a major fighting force in the Holy Land. Grand master Gerard of Ridefort led the Templars in support of Guy of Lusignan in his siege of Acre and lost his head to Saladin for his efforts. His successor Robert IV of Sablé ruled Cyprus after its capture by Richard the Lionheart until it was granted to Guy. The Templars and Hospitallers would quarrel over the administration of castles, settled in the latter's favor by the pope.

The Teutonic Knights were founded in 1190 in Acre and transformed into a military order in 1198 by Heinrich von Bassenheim.They participated in the Crusade of 1197 and later, under Hermann von Salza, supported the activities of Holy Roman Emperor Frederick II. Most of their activities were in support of the Northern Crusades, particularly the Prussian Crusades. The Hospitallers claimed authority over the Teutons until the treaty of 1258 after the War of Saint Sabas.

The Order of Saint Lazarus was formed in the 1130s in Jerusalem and initially was composed of Templars and Hospitallers who were afflicted with leprosy. They played a minor yet important role in the latter military actions in the Holy Land. (Note: Notable battles that the Order of Saint Lazarus participated in included the Battle of La Forbie in 1244 and the 1291 Siege of Acre.)

== Restoration of Jerusalem, 1203–1241 ==
The new century started poorly for those who desired a return to the apex of the kingdom, lost so dramatically in 1187. The first two decades saw two failed Crusades with minor military action in the Holy Land. Then, in 1129, Frederick II negotiated a return of Jerusalem from the Muslims with no spilling of blood. Frederick did not stay long in the kingdom and following his departure were a series of absentee kings. Despite this, the barons of the West launched expeditions which restored the kingdom to its largest extent since 1187. In-fighting among to Ayyubids helped the Christian cause, but petty rivalries among the Franks would be their eventual undoing.

=== Crusade against Christians ===
Innocent III became pope in January 1198, and a new crusade became the prime goal of his pontificate He issued his bull Post miserabile on 15 August 1198, mourning the loss of Jerusalem and the True Cross, calling for Christians to take up arms. It wasn't until the turn of the century that Western European nobility took notice and began prepartations for what became the Fourth Crusade. The strategy was to conquer Egypt, long regarded as the key to recovering Jerusalem.

Led by nobles such as Boniface of Montferrat and supported by the powerful Venetian doge Enrico Dandolo, the Crusaders contracted with Venice to provide a fleet and transport. Unable to pay the full cost, they agreed to help Venice with their Siege of Zara in 1202. The Crusade then became entangled in Byzantine politics when Alexios IV Angelos, son of the deposed Byzantine emperor Isaac II Angelos, promised the Crusaders money, military assistance, and church concessions if they restored his father to the throne. The Crusaders led the successful Siege of Constantinople in 1203, but Alexios failed to fulfill his promises and was overthrown.

In April 1204, renewed conflict with the Byzantines led to the Sack of Constantinople. The city was brutally looted, with churches, palaces, and private homes plundered and many priceless works of art destroyed or carried west. The Crusaders established the Latin Empire of Constantinople, dividing much of the Byzantine Empire among themselves and Venice. The promise of the restoration of the Holy Land to Christian domination had faded. Only one-fifth of the original Crusaders made it to the Holy Land, leading Aimery to seek a six-year truce with al-Adil and the Ayyubids. The truce, signed in September 1204, ceded Jaffa, Sidon and Ramla to the Franks and eased pilgrimages to Jerusalem and Nazareth.

=== John of Brienne ===
Aimery of Cyprus died on 1 April 1205 and Isabella became the sole ruler of the kingdom. She died shortly thereafter leaving her daughter Maria of Montferrat (whose father was Conrad of Montferrat) as ruler, under the regency of John of Ibelin. Aimery's ten-year-old son Hugh I of Cyprus became king of Cyprus under the regency of Walter of Montbéliard.

John negotiated a marriage between Maria and John of Brienne, which took place on 14 September 1210. They were jointly crowned as king and queen on 5 October 1210.

John of Brienne immediately faced a grave dilemma. The treaty between Acre and al-Adil had expired in September and the Ayyubid offer of extension was not accepted. John, the barons, Hospitallers and Teutonic Knights urged the renewal while the Latin patriarch Albert of Vercelli and Templars opposed a new treaty. Innocent III again called for a crusade but the response was tepid. Al-Mu'azzam, installed as governor of Damascus in 1200, mobilized and advanced as far as Acre. The Franks struck a blow in June 1211 with a raiding party under Walter of Montbéliard attacking the Nile delta.

Still wishing peace, al-Adil met the Franks at his new fortress at Mount Tabor in Galilee and a treaty through 1217 was signed. This ushered in a period of peace which allowed the kingdom to flourish. Maria died in late 1212 after giving birth to a daughter Isabella II. Despite significant opposition, John would continue to lead the kingdom as regent to their new daughter through 1228.

=== Hungarian Crusade and failure in Egypt ===
In April 1213, Innocent III issued the papal bull Quia maior calling for a new crusade to the Holy Land. This call was formalized at the Fourth Council of the Lateran, convened on 11 November 1215. The pope would die on 16 July 2016 and was replaced by Honorius III who continued to support the crusade, to begin at the expiration of the truce with the Ayyubids. He would appoint James of Vitry, bishop of Acre, as his point man in Syria to preach the crusade. John of Brienne would be commander-in-chief.

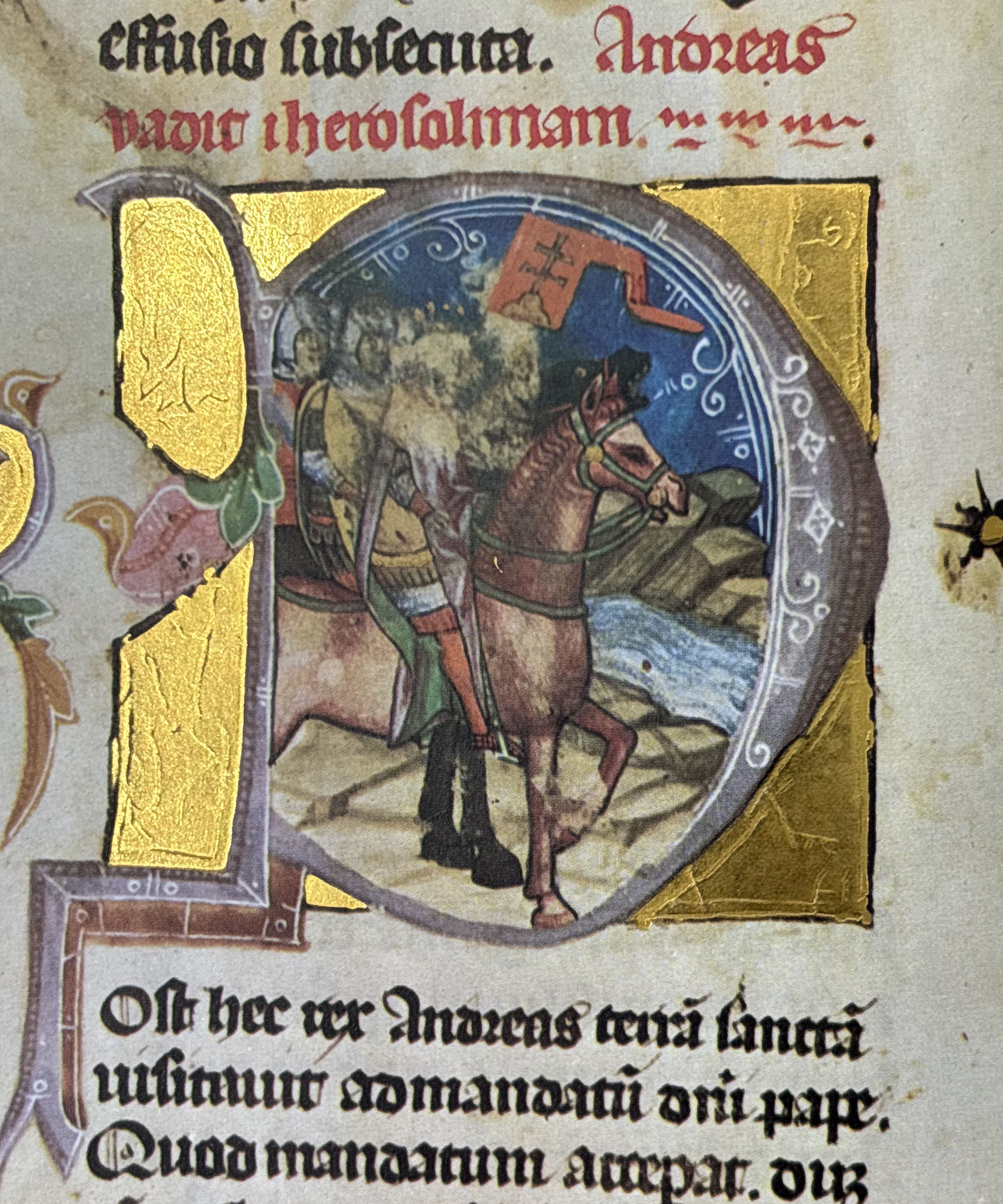
King Andrew II of Hungary at the head of his crusader army (Illuminated Chronicle)

A large army led by Andrew II of Hungary was first to arrive at Acre, sailing from Cyprus on 9 October 2017. Andrew's force, which included Leopold VI of Austria, was supplemented by Bohemond IV and Hugh I of Cyprus. They began their Siege of Mount Tabor on 30 November and abandoned it without success on 7 December 2017. Their army was ambushed at the Battle of Machghara on 15 December, suffering a humiliating defeat and ending what is known as the Hungarian Crusade. Andrew and his forces withdrew to Cyprus early the next year where Hugh I died on 10 January 1218. He was succeeded by his son Henry I of Cyprus. Andrew's crusading days were over.

Al-Adil was aware that the crusaders were en route and their likely targets were Jerusalem and Egypt, and he remained at Marj al-Saffar, protecting Damascus. His eldest son al-Kamil commanded the defense of Egypt while al-Mu'azzam guarded Jerusalem. The sultan would die on 31 August 1218 and be succeeded by his sons.

In the spring of 1218, the crusaders departed for Egypt under the command of John of Brienne. Their first target was engaged in the Siege of Damietta on 23 June and the city's tower fell on 31 August 1218. Shortly thereafter Pelagio Galvani, sent as papal legate, arrived with reinforcements, taking control of the expedition. The siege dragged on and in early 1219, al-Kamil offered a truce, with the restoration of Jerusalem to Frankish rule in exchange for the invading force departing Egypt.

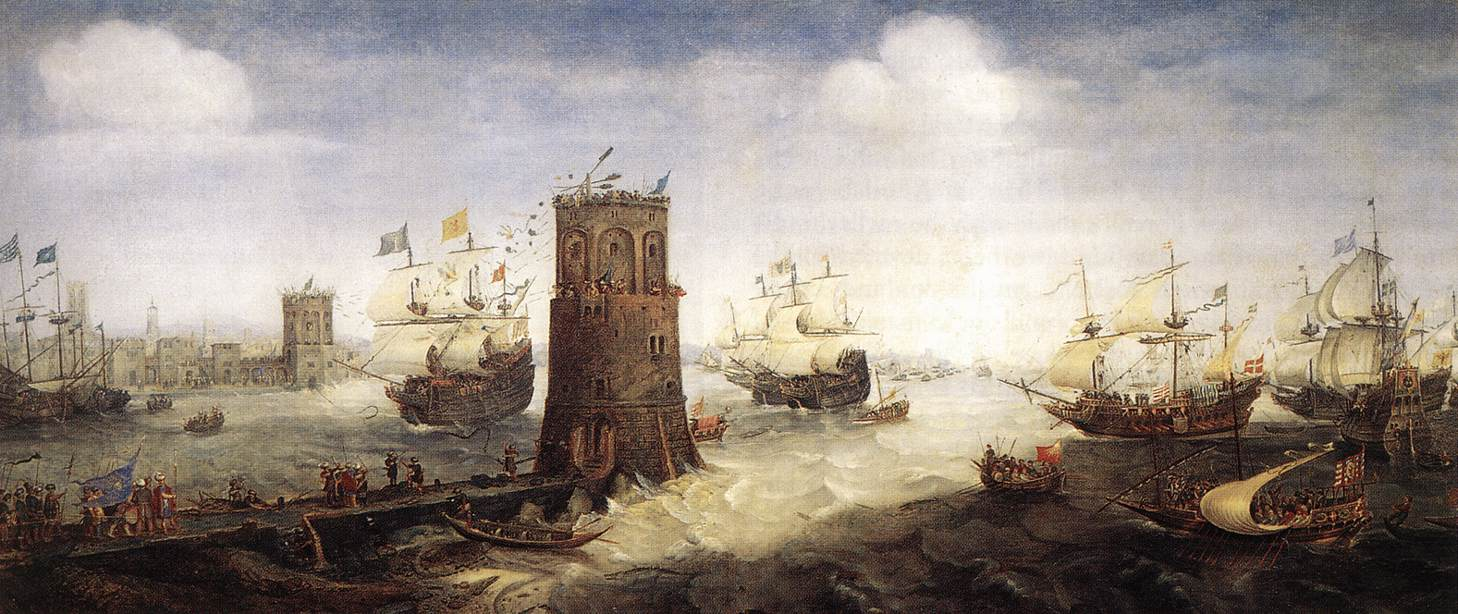
The Siege of Damietta

Surprisingly, al-Kamil's proposal was rejected by Pelagio who had the support of the Templars, Hospitallers and Venetians. They would later occupy all of Damietta which had been abandoned. John of Brienne had been overruled on the sultan's offer despite the fact that the terms would have met the crusade's main objective. John would soon return to Acre to deal with the death of his father-in-law Leo I of Armenia. He returned in July 1221 at the direction of the pope. By August 1221, the crusade essentially ended with their devastating loss at the Battle of Mansurah. The Fifth Crusade was over, having accomplished nothing.

=== Frederick II ===
Frederick II, king of Germany and Sicily, became Holy Roman Emperor on 22 November 1220. He had taken the cross five years earlier and committed to go on the Fifth Crusade, but never did. Honorius III was not happy with him, but did not press the issue. His successor Gregory IX, pope since 19 March 1227, was not so forgiving, insisting that the emperor lead a crusade. It was agreed that Frederick would lead the Sixth Crusade, to depart no later than 15 August 1227 and stay for at least two years.

Frederick wished to lead the crusade as king of Jerusalem and it was arranged for him to marry John of Brienne's daughter Isabella II. They married by proxy in August 1225 and she was crowned queen a few days later. A formal wedding in person was held on 9 November. Frederick prolaimed himself as king in December 1225, breaking his promise to John that he would remain king as long as he lived.

The first contingents of crusaders departed Italy in August 1227, arriving in the Holy Land that October. Frederick and his contingent sailed on 8 September 1227, but were waylaid at Otranto due to illness. Frederick remained, sending the bulk of his force eastward and dispatching emissaries to the pope to explain the situation. Gregory IX refused to meet with them and excommunicated Frederick on 29 September 1227.

Frederick finally sailed from southern Italy in June 1228 and reached the Holy Land several months later. His army was relatively small compared with the forces assembled during earlier Crusades, and he faced another serious problem–he was still excommunicated. Many churchmen therefore refused to cooperate with him, and his relationship with the leaders of the Crusader states was strained. Frederick also understood that a large military campaign against the powerful Ayyubids would be difficult. Rather than immediately attacking Muslim territory, he began looking for a diplomatic solution that could restore Jerusalem to Christian control without requiring a costly and uncertain war.

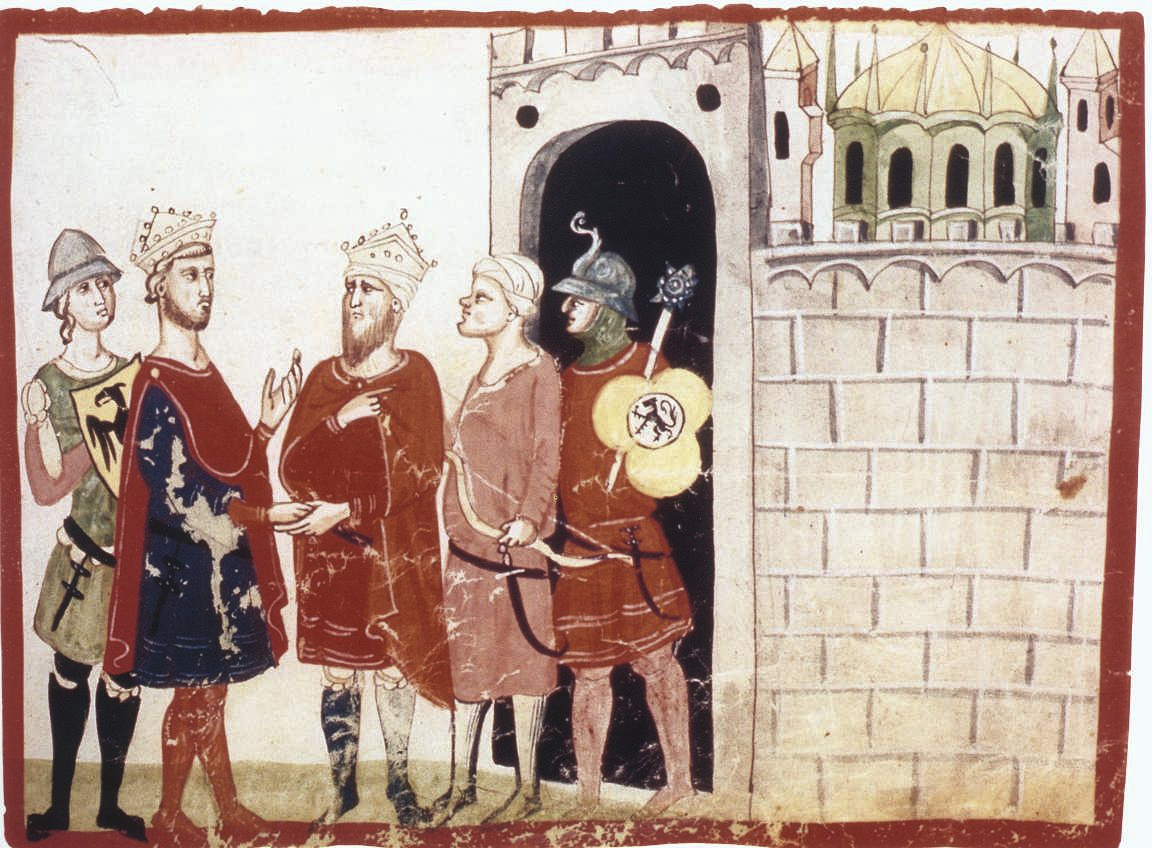
Frederick II meets al-Kamil (14th-century illumination from Giovanni Villani's Nuova Cronica).

Al-Kamil, as sultan of Egypt, was the de facto leader of the Ayyubid empire. He was facing conflicts with other members of his family and was interested in avoiding another major war with the Crusaders. Frederick and al-Kamil had already been in contact through an intermediary Fakhr al-Din ibn al-Shaykh, and both recognized that negotiation might serve their interests. The negotiations eventually centered on the status of Jerusalem, under Muslim control since 1187. For Frederick, recovering Jerusalem was the central purpose of his expedition and an important means of restoring his reputation. For al-Kamil, surrendering the city could be acceptable if it helped him deal with his political rivals and avoided a dangerous war.

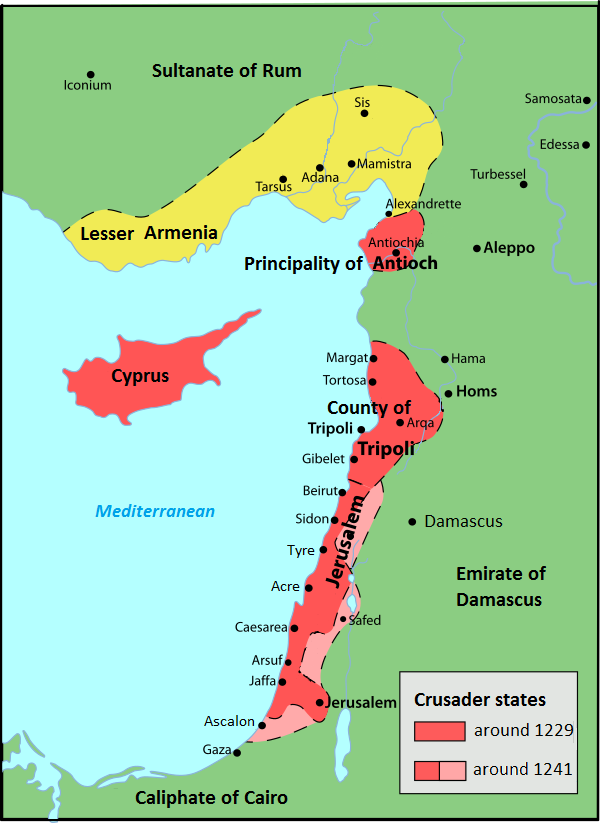
Map of the Crusader states after the treaty of Jaffa, 1229

After prolonged negotiations, the two rulers reached an agreement without fighting a major battle. The settlement was an extraordinary achievement because Frederick had obtained the principal objective of the crusade through diplomacy. The subsequent Treaty of Jaffa, was concluded in February 1229. Under its terms, Jerusalem, Bethlehem, and a corridor connecting Jerusalem with the Mediterranean coast were returned to Christian control. The Muslims retained control of the Temple Mount, including the Dome of the Rock and the al-Aqsa Mosque. The treaty also provided for a ten-year truce between the two sides.

Neither side was happy with the treaty, but nevertheless Fredereck entered Jerusalem on 17 March 1229 and received the formal surrender from al-Kamil's agent. He then went to the Church of the Holy Sepulchre the next day and placed the crown on his own head.

Still wearing his crown, Frederick proceeded to the palace of the Hospitallers where he met with the English bishops and members of the military orders to discuss the fortifications of the city. Frederick's interest in Jerusalem was waning, as he was planning to immediately leave. En route to the harbour, he was pelted with garbage by the unappreciative people of Acre. On 1 May 1229, Frederick departed from Acre, landing at Cyprus. Frederick obtained relief from his excommunication on 28 August 1230 with the signing of the Treaty of San Germano.

=== Absentee kings of Jerusalem ===
Frederick's wife Isabella II gave birth to a son Conrad II on 25 April 1128 and died a few days later. This reduced Frederick's status from king to a mere regent, although he continued to use the regal title. This gave rise to the War of the Lombards of 1228–1243 between the Lombard League—a coalition of barons and other nobles in the kingdom of Jerusalem and Cyprus—and supporters of the imperial Hohenstaufen dynasty.

Frederick tried to exercise direct imperial authority over the kingdom, but his relations with the local nobles were extremely poor. Many of them resented Frederick's attempts to impose his authority from afar and his reliance on officials from Italy and Germany. When Frederick's representative Richard Filangieri arrived in the kingdom in 1231, the dispute became an open political and military struggle. Filangieri first attempted to take control of Tyre, but the local nobles rallied around John of Ibelin, the lord of Beirut and leader of the opposition to Frederick. The anti-imperial nobles became the basis of the Lombard League. In 1231 the citizens of Acre formed a commune to unify their opposition to Filangieri.

The Lombards established their principal base at Acre, while Filangieri and his supporters held Tyre. The struggle therefore divided the kingdom into rival political camps. John of Ibelin's forces eventually besieged Tyre, but Filangieri managed to retain the city with imperial support. Fighting also spread to Cyprus, where Frederick's supporters and the Ibelin family competed for control. The Ibelins gradually became the dominant force among the opponents of Frederick. In Cyprus, they defeated the imperial party at the Battle of Agridi in 1232, effectively securing Ibelin control of the island.

During the decade following the Sixth Crusade, central authority virtually collapsed in the kingdom, weaking the ability to fight the real enemy, the Muslims.The conflict gradually subsided, although the underlying constitutional dispute was never completely resolved. The barons of Acre and the Ibelins emerged with greatly increased political influence, while the authority of the Hohenstaufen emperors in the Holy Land declined sharply.

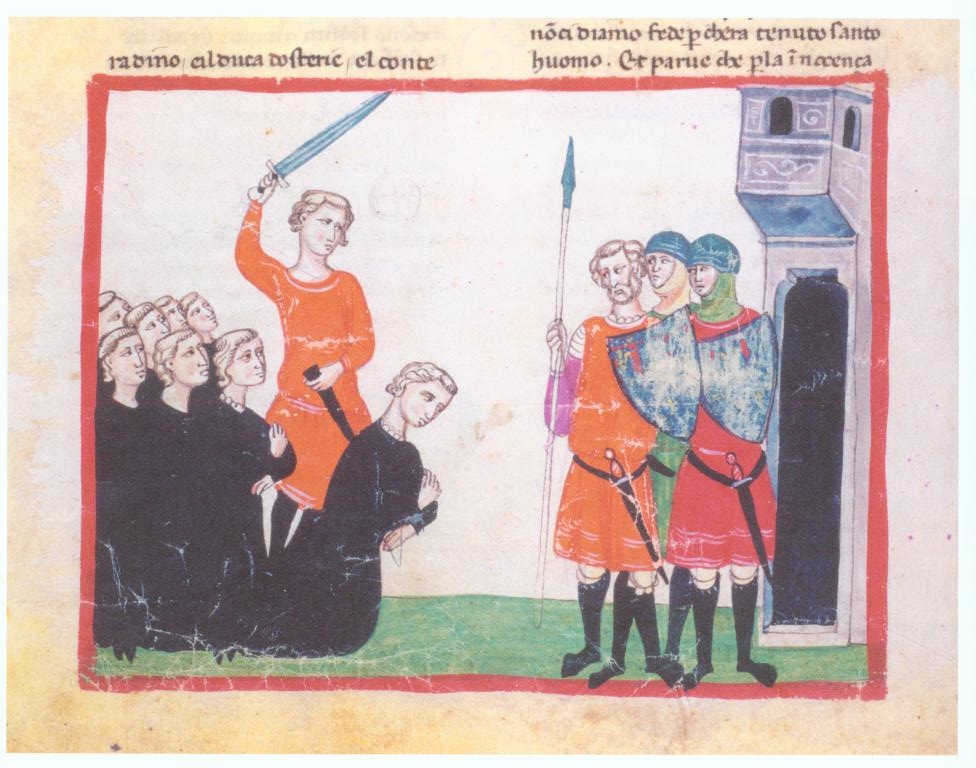
Execution of Conradin by Giovanni Villani, Nuova Cronica, 14th century

Frederick lost the rights to the regency of the nominal king of Jerusalem, Conrad II, to Alice of Champagne in 1243. After Alice's death in 1246, her son Henry I of Cyprus became regent, passing to Henry's wife Plaisance of Antioch upon his death in 1254.

When Conrad II died on 21 May 1254, he was succeeded by his son Conradin (or Conrad III), then just two years old. He attempted to reclaim the throne of the Kingdom of Sicily from Charles I of Anjou, but was defeated at the Battle of Tagliacozzo in 1268. He was caught, tried for treason and beheaded on 29 October 1268, ending the rule of the House of Hohenstaufen. Hugh III of Cyprus, regent to Conradin, was then anointed king, a title inherited from his mother Isabella of Cyprus, a granddaughter of Isabella I. He would serve as king until 1284.

=== Death of al-Kamil ===
As emir of Damascus, al-Mu'azzam had assisted his brother al-Kamil in the defense of Egypt during the Fifth Crusade. In January 1223 he had joined with Keukbori in a rebellion against his younger brother al-Ashraf who ruled the Jazira. Constrained by al-Kamil, he used his influence to weaken the Egyptian army, forcing the sultan to negotiate an end to the Sixth Crusade. Al-Mu'azzam died in 1227 and was succeeded by his son an-Nasir Dawud. An-Nasir's resistance to Cairo was met by the Siege of Damascus led by al-Kamil and al-Ashraf in spring 1229. The city surrendered on 15 June 1229 and al-Ashraf was made emir of Damascus.

After the Siege of Kerak in 1188, the Castle of Kerak fell under Ayyubid control, and an-Nasir would move on the rule the fortress and its city from 1229 through 1248. In 1232, al-Kamil installed his eldest son as-Salih Ayyub to govern Hisn Kayfa.

Al-Ashraf's rule in Damascus was stable, but he and the other emirs of Syria sought to assert their independence from Cairo. He died on 27 August 1237 after a four-month illness and was succeeded by his brother as-Salih Ismail. Two months later, al-Kamil's Egyptian army arrived and besieged Damascus, but Ismail had destroyed the suburbs of the city to deny al-Kamil's forces shelter.

Al-Kamil died on 6 March 1238 and was succeeded in Egypt by his son al-Adil II. As-Salih Ayyub disputed the succession and occupied Damascus in December 1238, but his uncle Ismail retrieved the city in September 1239. Ismail's cousin an-Nasir Dawud had Ismail detained in Kerak in a move to prevent the latter's arrest by al-Adil II. Ismail entered into an alliance with Dawud who released him the following year, allowing as-Salih Ayyub to proclaim himself sultan in place of al-Adil II in May 1240. He would rule until 1249.

=== Crusade of the Barons ===
The ten-year truce between Frederick II and al-Kamil was good through 1239, but that didn't stop Gregory IX from planning a further crusade to the Holy Land. He issued his papal bull Rachel suum videns on 17 November 1234 call for a crusade to commence once the truce had expired. After much back-and-forth, two waves of crusaders were planned, one under Theobald I of Navarre and the other led by Richard of Cornwall.

The crusade, in addition to lacking clear objectives, took place in a time of chaos on all fronts. In Europe, the struggles between the pope and the emperor resulted in Frederick's excommunication on 20 March 1239. To the East, the kingdom was essentially leaderless with competing factions vying for control. This was tempered by the on-going civil war of the Ayyubids. Against this backdrop, Theobald's host of nobles and some 1500 knights arrived in Acre on 1 September 1239.

Theobald stayed mostly at Acre, with some minor skirmishes with the local Muslims. The only real combat was at the Battle at Gaza on 13 November 1239 where as-Salih Ayyub's Egyptian forces routed the Franks, with a significant number of prisoners taken. The Franks, led by Amaury de Montfort and Henry of Bar, withdrew rather than counterattack, hoping for an exchange of hostages.

The next month, an-Nasir Dawud set his sights on the city of Jerusalem. Jerusalem was under the purview of Richard Filangieri at Tyre and the city's defenses had degraded during the turmoil in the kingdom. An-Nasir easily overcame what little opposition was offered by 7 December 1239. He then withdrew back to Kerak.

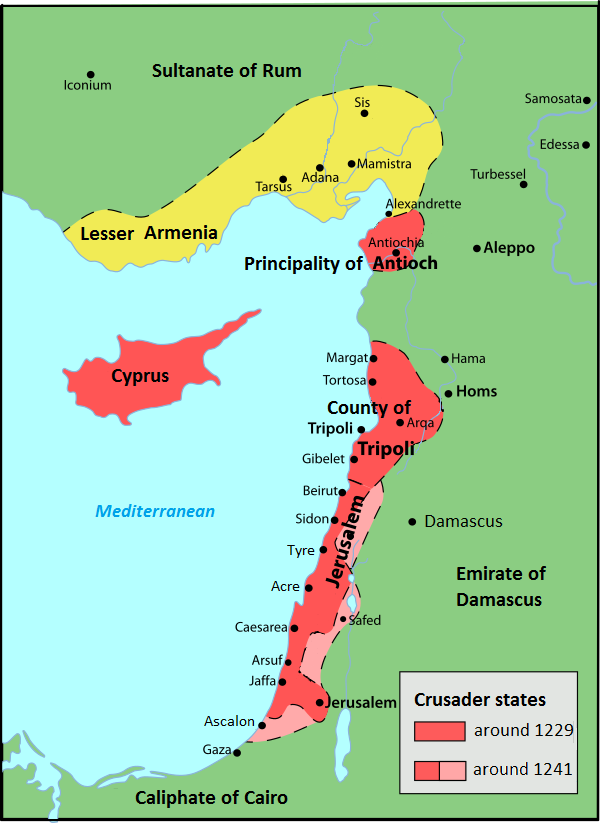
Map of the Crusader states after the treaty of 1241

The crusading host arrived in Acre as the Ayyubid civil war was playing out. In retaliation to the naming of as-Salih Ayyub as sultan in Cairo, as-Salih Ismail offered Damascus' support to the Franks. Ismail proposed a truce as well as significant concessions of land, and his proposal was unacceptable to many in both camps. On the Christian side, the Hospitallers were against it, the Templars were for it. Many on the Muslim side refused to relinquish their positions.

At the same time, the Hospitallers were working with the sultan on a truce with Egypt, with land and prisoners exchanged. On this, the Templars were in the opposition. As Ismail had already surrendered Galilee, the Egyptian proposal was accepted in theory, but not finalized. Tired of the excursion, Theobald returned to Acre and sailed to Europe in mid-September 1240, believing he had accomplished his mission.

On 8 October 1240, Richard of Cornwall arrived at Acre with his small force of several hundred knights. They saw no combat but Richard did finalize the negotiations with Cairo. On 23 April 1241, an exchange of prisoners completed the new treaty. Remarkably, this quixotic crusade afforded the kingdom its largest footprint since 1187.

=== Tentative peace in the kingdom ===
Richard departed Acre on 3 May 1241 thinking that he had secured the peace and restored the old kingdom to its former glory. The Ibelins had agreed to accept Frederick's rule if Simon of Montfort would be appointed bailiff of Jerusalem. But in the end, nothing changed in the near term.

Internal strife was rampant. The Templars, unhappy with the Hospitaller-supported treaty with Egypt, besieged the latter in Acre in 1241 and later attacked Muslim-held Hebron. An-Nasir Dawud responded by attacking Christian pilgrims and merchants. On 30 October, the Templars sacked Nablus, burning their mosque and attacking even Christians. Again, an-Nasir responded by sending a small force against the attackers.

The rampage continues, Templar versus Hospitaller, imperialist versus the local barons. Richard Filangieri was recalled to Italy and left his brother Lothair to rule in Tyre, returning shortly thereafter. The barons the accepted the claim of Alice of Champagne to the regency of Conrad II who would come of age on 25 April 1243. Her first act was the capture of the city of Tyre, expelling the Filangieris, and on 10 July 1243, imperial rule in Jerusalem ended. The kingdom had restored most of its lost territory, but still lacked a central authority and was surrounded by enemies.

== Decline of the kingdom ==
The attempt of Frederick II to impose his will on the kingdom was shattered. By 1243, the kingdom was then governed by a strict interpretation of its constitution and it was constantly on the brink of anarchy. Then, in 1244, the devastation of Jerusalem was not simply another change of possession. It effectively ended the Franks' hope of restoring Jerusalem by local military forces. After 1244, the center of what remained of the kingdom shifted increasingly toward Acre and the coastal cities, while Jerusalem remained under Muslim control.

=== State of the Holy Land ===
After the territorial gains made by the crusades of Frederick and the barons, the kingdom was a narrow strip along the Mediterranean with corridor leading from Jaffa to Jerusalem and Bethlehem. All of Galilee, under Odo of Montbéliard, had been guaranteed by Richard of Cornwall's diplomacy. The County of Tripoli lay to the north, now ruled by Bohemond V of Antioch, and included the formidable Krak des Chevaliers. Farther to the north, separated by the Muslim cities of Jabala and Latakia, lay the remnants of the Principality of Antioch, with access to the sea provided by St. Simeon.

Having come of age, Conrad II sent Thomas of Aquino to be his representative at Acre, but he was rejected by the ruling barons and bishops on 5 June 1243 as the king had not personally come to the Holy Land. Alice of Champagne and her husband Ralph of Soissons were designated as the legal regents. They were not allocated Tyre as expected, the city instead going to Philip of Montfort. When Alice died in 1247, the Haute Cour, dominated by the Ibelins, gave the regency to Henry I of Cyprus. (Note: The Haute Cour included sons of John of Ibelin, the Old Lord of Beirut, Balian of Beirut and John of Arsuf, cousins John of Ibelin, Balian Grenier, Philip of Tyre, and Odo of Montbéliard.)

There was little unity among the military orders. The Templars had opposed Frederick and so came out ahead of the Hospitallers. The former supported an alliance with Damascus, the latter Egypt. The Teutonic Knights tended to support the Hospitallers. The Genoese were with the Hospitallers, the Venitians with the Templars.

=== Strife amongst the Ayyubids ===
The Ayyubids were divided between Egypt under as-Salih Ayyub and Damascus under his uncle as-Salih Ismail. His cousin an-Nasir Dawud of Kerak was the wild card in the game, never knowing on which side he would land. Allied with Ismail was al-Mansur Ibrahim, emir of Homs.

The Templars under Armand de Périgord now controlled the kingdom's foreign policy and were negotiating with both parties concerning the status of Jerusalem, In the spring of 1244, war broke out between Cairo and Damascus, with the latter being supported by both an-Nasir and al-Mansur. The Templars convinced the barons of the kingdom to back Damascus and Ismail offered the Franks a foothold in Egypt once Ayyub was overthrown.

But Egypt was also pursuing allies and found them in the Khwarazmians. (Note: The Mongol's westward expansion reached the Middle East when the Mongol conquest of the Khwarazmian Empire occurred in Central Asia in 1227. Part of the Khwarazmian army fled to eastern Anatolia and these masterless Turkic soldiers offered their services to the neighbouring rulers for pay.) Since the death of their commander Jalal al-Din Mangburni, a Khwarazmian force of some ten thousand had been leaderless, wandering about, and was for hire. Ayyub purchased their services, with the immediate target of Damascus. Proving too difficult, the force descended on Galilee, sacking Tiberias and Nablus. Their next target was far more ambitious.

=== Destruction of Jerusalem ===
The Khwarazmians, supported in part by the Qaymariyya tribe, reached Jerusalem in July 1244. The city was poorly positioned to resist because the Franks no longer controlled enough territory around it to provide an effective defense. The patriarch Robert of Nantes, Templar master Armand de Périgord and Hospitaller master Guillaume de Chateauneuf rushed to the city to refortify the garrison at the Tower of David, slipping out before the assault began.

The attack began on 11 July 1244 and the city was quickly overwhelmed. The Khwarazmians entered Jerusalem and sacked the city, with particularly severity towards the Christian population. The Christian quarter was devastated, and the Church of the Holy Sepulchre was desecrated and the bones of the kings scattered.

With no help coming from Acre, the defenders called on an-Nasir who sent a force to the city. Anxious to avoid a battle, the Khwarazmians offered safe passage to garrison in exchange for their surrender. The Tower of David, the city's principal citadel, held out until 23 August 1244. When it surrendered, some six thousand Christian inhabitants left on the road to Jaffa. Taking a last look at the city, they saw the Frankish banners unfurled and thought that a rescue force had arrived. Those who returned to the city walked into a massacre. Two thousand died and those who left for Jaffa were subject to continual raids by Arab bandits. Only three hundred completed their journey.

After the sack of Jerusalem, the Khwarazmians abandoned the city and marched to Gaza to join the main Egyptian force. Nearly seven centuries would pass before a Christian army would again occupy Jerusalem.

=== Disaster at La Forbie ===
After the fall of Jerusalem, the Franks thought that Acre would be next and a defending force was assembled. Overall command was given to Philip of Montfort and Walter of Brienne, with the grand masters of the military orders leading their contingents. Antioch and Tripoli sent troops commanded by Bohemond of Botron and his son William of Botron. They were supported by Muslim troops from Damascus, Homs and Kerak, with the latter two led by al-Mansur Ibrahim and an-Nasir Dawud. The opposing Ayyubid/Khwarazmian force was led by Rukn-ad-Din Baybars.

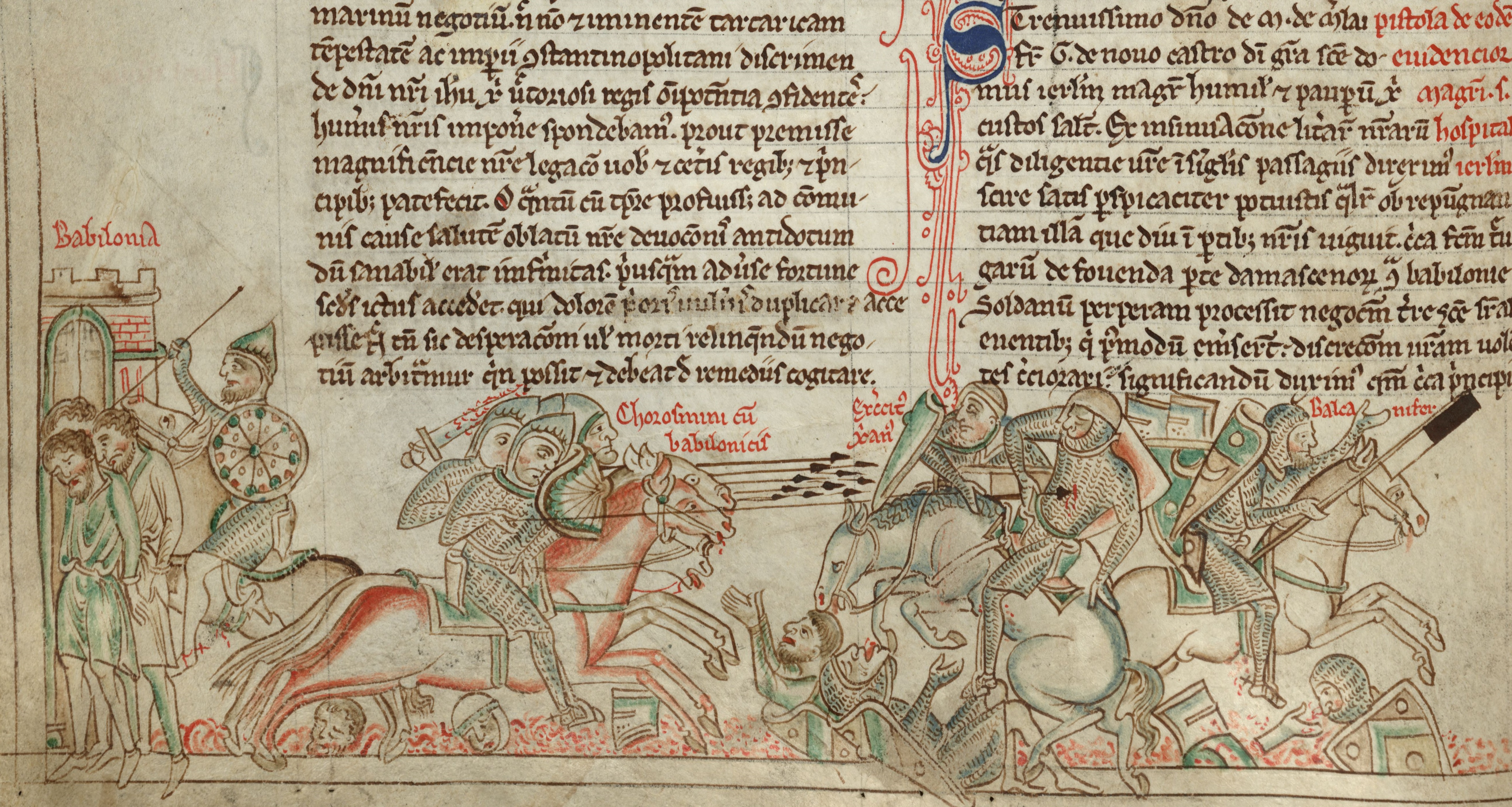
Battle of La Forbie, from Chronica Majora by Matthew Paris

The armies met near Forbie, a small village northeast of Gaza, on 17 October 1224. Al-Mansur cautioned against a frontal assault, opting for maintaining a defensive position. He understood that the Khwarazminians disliked attacking fortified positions and inactivity on the battlefield may make them restless and move on. Nevertheless, Walter of Brienne's call for immediate offensive action was answered. The Franks took the right flank, Damascus and Homs in the center, and an-Nasir's Bedouin troops on the left.

As the battle began, the Egyptians met the Franks while the Khwarazminians engaged the Damascenes, who soon turned and fled. The Bedouins soon followed and al-Mansur's troops had to cut their way through their fleeing compatriots. The Khwarazminians then joined the Egyptians in a massacre of the Franks. Five thousand were killed and another eight hundred captured. Only a handful of the Templars, Hospitallers and Teutonic Knights survived. The utter destruction of the Frankish army was only surpassed by that at Hattin. This combination of the fall of Jerusalem and the destruction of the Frankish army at La Forbie marked a major collapse of Christian military power in the Holy Land.

After his successes against the Franks, Ayyub set about taming his errant cousins. Damascus soon capitulated as did Galilee and the other Syrian emirates. The Khwarazminians remained a problem but they were soon scattered. In August 1247, he began his Siege of Ascalon. On 15 October, Ascalon fell and Ayyub had its fortifications dismantled and the city abandoned.

Despite their losses, the kingdom was relatively tranquil. Alice of Champagne had died in 1246 and was succeeded as regent by her son Henry I of Cyprus. He appointed first Balian of Beirut as bailiff and, after 1247, John of Arsuf. Bohemond V of Antioch tried not to involve his domains of Antioch and Tripoli in the affairs of their southern compatriots.

In Europe, Gregory IX died in August 1241 and was eventually succeeded by Innocent IV who was elected pope on 25 June 1243. (Note: Gregory IX's first successor was Celestine IV who died after one month. The papal conclave electing Innocent IV lasted eighteen months.) The Franks' disasters at Jerusalem and La Forbie led Innocent IV to call for a new crusade at the First Council of Lyon in 1245. Louis IX of France, king since 1226, would be among to first to take the cross for what became the Seventh Crusade, an expedition to Egypt beginning in 1248.

=== Louis IX at Acre ===
Louis' Egyptian crusade started out well with the capture of Damietta in 1249, but by the next year, it turned disastrous for the Franks, with heavy losses and the king and most of his men captured. Ransomed by the Egyptians, Louis arrived in Acre in May 1250. His primary goal was to negotiate the release of his troops that remained as prisoners, but he became the de facto ruler of the kingdom during his following four years of residence in the Holy Land. During his tenure, the defenses of the key cities of Acre, Caesarea and Jaffa were strengthened to resist of an expected onslaught.

On 9 July 1250, an-Nasir Yusuf, emir of Aleppo, took control of Damascus and essential became the Ayyubid sultan of Syria. The resulting conflict with Cairo played into Louis' hands and the mere threat of a Frankish-Damascene alliance resulted in the release of his men from the Egyptian prisons in March 1252. At some point, an-Nasir suggested he would cede Jerusalem to the Franks in exchange for such an alliance, but Louis had neither the appetite nor the forces for further action in Egypt. In March 1253, Jerualem was given to Cairo.

On 21 February 1254, Louis negotiated a truce with an-Nasir to last two years, six months and forty days. After his loss at yet another Battle of Jaffa on 17 March 1256, Aybak, the new Mamluk sultan of Egypt, accepted a truce with Acre that would last through February 1265. Louis would then leave Acre for France on 24 April 1254.

Henry I of Cyprus died on 18 January 1253 and the regency of Conrad II passed to his widow Plaisance of Antioch. To bolster her standing in the kingdom, she married Balian of Arsuf, the constable and bailiff, but it lasted but a year. Then, on 21 May 1254, Conrad II died and his young son Conradin became king with no changes to the governance to the kingdom. He would serve as king until his death in 1268, having never set foot in his domain.

=== Maritime republics at war ===
The maritime republics of Venice and Genoa fought repeatedly over commercial privileges and political influence in Acre. Beginning as a quarrel over the monastery of Saint Sabas (Mar Saba), the conflict was one of dominance over commerce in the kingdom. In 1256, the Venetians were expelled from Tyre, where the Genoese had considerable influence. This dispute then moved to Acre, where both sides claimed rights to property associated with the monastery.

The conflict spread through the kingdom. Venice was supported by the Templars and John of Ibelin. Genoa was supported by Philip of Montfort, John of Arsuf, and the Hospitallers. Pisa initially favored Genoa but subsequently allied itself with Venice.

The decisive episode came on 25 June 1258. The Genoese sent a large fleet to relieve their besieged community in Acre. Their fleet met the Venetians, commanded by doge Lorenzo Tiepolo, near Acre. The ensuing Battle of Acre was a major Venetian victory, with the Genoese losing roughly half their fleet, with 24 galleys captured and about 1,700 men killed or captured. The Genoese were subsequently forced to abandon Acre and withdraw toward Tyre.

Their fighting in the Levant consequently continued through the 1260s, consisting largely of naval raids, attacks on merchant shipping, and intermittent fighting around Acre and Tyre. The conflict finally ended in 1270 with the Peace of Cremona. Neither republic gained much of anything, but Genoa did not return to its commercial quarter in Acre until 1288. The most important consequence was the damage done to the kingdom. Acre was in need of serious repair, enormous resources had been consumed, and the leading military and political factions of the Christian Levant had been divided against one another leaving an opening for the Muslims.

== Mamluks, Mongols and Assassins ==
The thirteenth century in the Levant saw the decline of Saladin's dynasty, met by the rise of another even more dangerous, the Mamluks, beginning in Egypt and eventually in Syria. They were counterbalanced by the invasion of the Mongol Empire with whom the Franks would try to ally with. The wild card group were the Order of Assassins, surreptitiously fighting for or against the other players.

=== Rise of the Mamluks ===
In medieval Egypt, the Mamluks were slave-soldiers, mostly Turkic, that were converted to Islam and trained in military arts. Beginning in 1250 and ruling for nearly three centuries, the Mamluk sultans would spell the demise ot the Kingdom of Jerusalem.

In the midst of Louis IX's crusade to Egypt, Ayyubid sultan as-Salih Ayyub died and, on 22 November 1249, his son al-Muazzam Turanshah succeeded him. On 2 May 1250, Turanshah was murdered by a group of disgruntled Mamluks. Unable to decide on a successor, the Ayyubid emirs selected his widow Shajar al-Durr as sultana with the Mamluk commander Aybak as her atabeg. She soon married Aybak and abdicated, and he became sultan.

Aybak was forced to yield his position to the Ayyubid al-Ashraf Musa, stepping back to atabeg. Al-Ashraf was but a puppet leader to Aybak, but this arrangement satisfied the Abbasid caliph al-Musta'sim. Aybak was challenged by al-Nasir Yusuf of Damascus who invaded Egypt and was defeated by the Mamluk emir Faris al-Din Aktay in October 1250. Al-Nasir's threat to Cairo was ended at his defeat at the Battle of al-Kura on 2 February 1251 and he returned chastened to Damascus.

Aybak was murdered on 12 April 1257, possibly on the orders of his wife who was murdered a week later. He was succeeded by his teenaged son al-Mansur Ali, under the watchful eye of strongman Sayf ad-Din Qutuz. Qutuz became sultan in November 1259 and led the campaign against the Mongols the next year. He, in turn, was murdered by one of his commanders.

Baibars was that commander who murdered Qutuz and would succeed him as Sultan of Egypt and Syria in 1260. He would be the scourge of both the Franks and the remaining Ayyubids and was the founder of the dynasty of the Bahri Mamluks, to last a century. (Note: Some historians regard Shajar al-Durr and Aybak as the first of the Bahri Mamluks.)

=== Coming of the Mongols ===
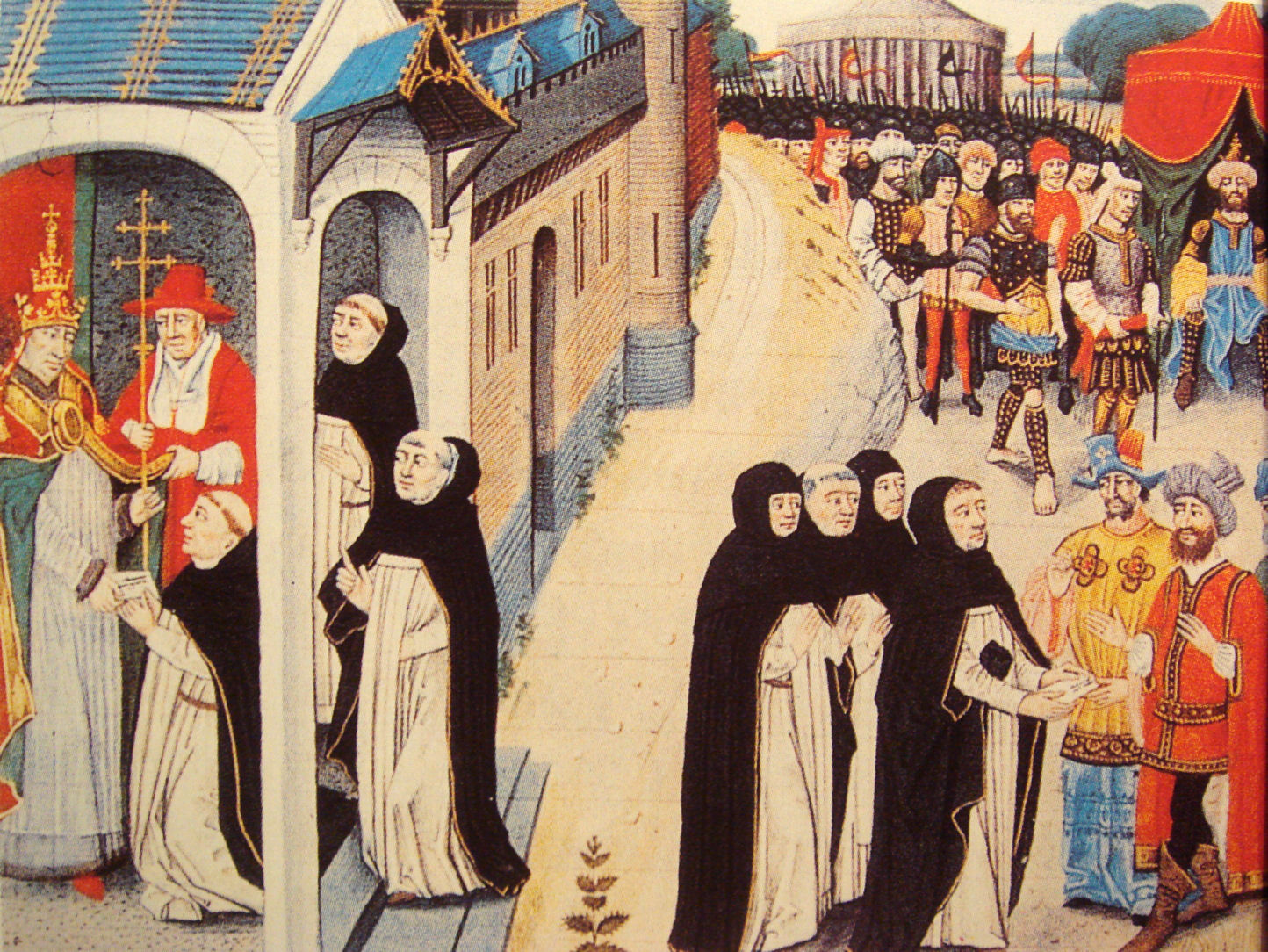
Ascelin of Lombardy submitting the pope's letter to Baiju. From David Aubert's Chronique des empereurs.

The Mongol Empire was founded in 1206 by Genghis Khan and began its expansion into Central Asia within five years, culminating in the conquest of the Khwarazmians in 1221. After the death of Genghis Khan in 1227, his son Ögedei took the fight to Central Europe and Anatolia. (Note: Reference the Mongol invasion of Europe and the Mongol conquest of Anatolia.) The Mongol invasion of Europe ended in 1242 with the death of Ögedei their conquest of Anatolia was completed after their defeat of the Sultanate of Rum at the Battle of Köse Dağ in 1243.

Hoping to form a Franco-Mongol alliance, Innocent IV began his overtures to empire in 1245 when he sent his envoy John of Plano Carpini to Mongolia to deliver a letter Cum non solum. He was not successful. But when Ascelin of Lombardy was sent to meet the Mongol general Baiju Noyan in May 1247, exchanges of letters occurred and the pope's 1247 letter Viam agnoscere veritatis beseeched them the convert to Christianity.

These overtures would continue by Louis IX as he began his expedition to the Levant. In 1248, he received envoys from Eljigidei, the Mongol commander stationed in Armenia and Persia. Eljigidei proposed that Louis should launch an offensive in Egypt while he targeted Baghdad to prevent the unification of the Muslim forces in Egypt and Syria. In response, Louis sent André de Longjumeau, a Dominican priest, as a delegate to Güyük Khan in Mongolia. However, Güyük's death preceded the arrival of the emissary, and his widow and acting regent, Oghul Qaimish, rejected the diplomatic proposition. Louis sent another representative, the Franciscan William of Rubruck to the Mongol court. Rubruck visited Möngke in Mongolia and spent several years there. In 1259, Berke, the leader of the Golden Horde, demanded Louis's submission. In contrast, Mongol emperors Möngke and Hulegu unsuccessfully attempted to solicit military aid from Louis.

Having conquered the Kingdom of Georgia in 1236, Hetoum I of Armenia agreed to become a vassal state of the Mongols, sending his brother Sempad to negotiate the details in 1247. He then persuaded his son-in-law Bohemond VI of Antioch to do the same and in 1260, the principality became a tributary of the Mongols. Both Hetoum and Bohemond joined the Mongols in their later conquests and were rewarded with additional land, but vilified by the Franks.

=== Assassins in Syria ===
The Assassins were founded by the Arab religious scholar Hassan-i Sabbah in 1090 after the capture of Alamut Castle in the Alborz mountain range of Persia. They practiced a radical form of Islam which called for the killing of their perceived enemies–Muslim or Christian–and when convenient, forming alliances with them. Beginning in the early 12th century, the Assassins moved into Syria, wreaking havoc on the Syrian rulers.

The first attack against Frankish rulers came in 1192. Assassins disguised as Christian monks had infiltrated the bishopric of Tyre, gaining the confidence of both the archbishop Joscius and Conrad of Montferrat. There they stabbed Conrad to death. The surviving Assassin is reputed to have named Richard the Lionheart as the instigator, who had much to gain as demonstrated by the rapidity at which his widow Isabella I married Henry II of Champagne.

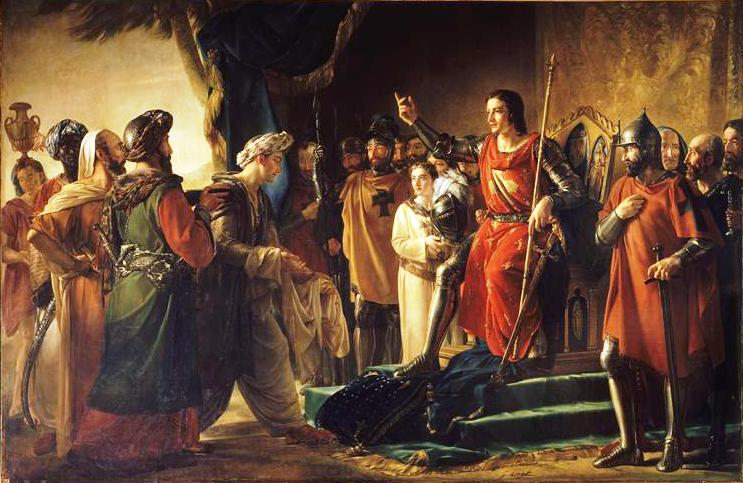
Saint Louis receiving the envoy of the Assassins. Painting by Georges Rouget, 1819.

While Louis IX was at Acre, emissaries of Assassin leader Radi ad-Din Abu'l-Ma'āli met with him, demanding a tribute be paid to his chief, sometimes referred to as the Old Man of the Mountain. Alternately, the king could pay the tribute the Assassins owed to the Templars and Hospitallers. In the end, a mutual defense pact was signed between the two parties. However, Louis was much more intent on securing an arrangement with the Assassins' bitter enemies, the Mongols.

As early as 1221, the Assassins had made overtures to the Mongols, seeking an alliance. This went as far as a joint Abbasid-Assassin approach to the East. Nothing came of these gestures, and in 1253, the Mongols began their Campaign against the Nizaris in Persia. Ordered by Möngke and led by Hülegü, this campaign ended in December 1256 with the Siege of Alamut.

The Assassins of Syria continued to be tolerated by the Mamluks and held a few castles under Mamluk suzerainty. The Mamluks may have employed members of the order against their own enemies, notably in the attempted assassination of Lord Edward I of England in 1271.

=== Mongol invasion of Iraq and Syria ===
After their success in Persia against the Assassins, the Mongols turned their attention to first Iraq and then Syria. In early 1258, a large Mongol force led by Hulegu attacked the heart of the Abbasid empire. The Siege of Baghdad and subsequent sack of the city left caliph al-Musta'sim dead and marked the end of both his caliphate and the Islamic Golden Age.

On 24 January 1260, Hulegu again led his Mongol forces in the Siege of Aleppo. He was supported by Christian troops from Armenia and Antioch, and they easily took the city. An-Nasir Yusuf, Ayyubid emir of Aleppo and Damascus, fled to Gaza. Then on 1 March 1260, the Mongols under Christian general Kitbuqa led their combined armies to take Damascus. An-Nasir was eventually captured and executed.

== Baibars' conquests ==
Baibars, like Saladin, consolidated his rule over the Levantine Muslims, providing a unified front against the Franks. Known as Abu al-Futuh (Father of Conquests), he was of Kipchak origin, captured and sold into slavery during the Mongol invasions and ultimately entered the service of Ayyubid sultan as-Salih Ayyub. He became a prominent military leader in Egypt in conflicts with the Mongols, Franks and Ayyubids. Assassinating his predecessor Qutuz, as sultan he secured the loyalty of the Ayyubid emirs in Syria and launched extensive campaigns against the kingdom before his death in 1277.

=== Mongols defeated at Ain Jalut and Homs ===
Battle of Ain Jalut

Baibars first came to prominence with his military prowess against the Mongols. After taking Aleppo and Damascus, Mongol leader Hulegu turned his attention to Cairo, sending envoys to the sultan Qutuz demanding his surrender. The envoys were quickly beheaded and the sultan advanced his forces to Palestine to meet the Mongol forces, now under Kitbuqa. (Note: Hulagu returned to Mongolia after the death of Möngke Khan leaving his forces under the command of Kitbuka)

The Mamluk and Mongol forces met at the Battle of Ain Jalut on 3 September 1260. Baibars was leading the vanguard of the attacking Mamluk force which resulted in a decisive victory over the Mongols. Kitbuqa was killed in the action and al-Ashraf Musa, the emir of Homs, surrendered. Damascus and Aleppo were soon taken by the Mamluks.

That November, the Mongols recaptured Aleppo. In response al-Ashraf Musa and al-Mansur II Muhammad, emir of Hama, formed a coalition to fight them. They met at the First Battle of Homs on 10 December 1260, where the Mongol force was soundly defeated, with most of their force killed or captured. These two defeats essentially ended the Mongol threat in the Levant for decades and marked the end of Ayyubid rule in Syria.

=== Baibars as sultan ===
Shortly after Ain Jalut, Qutuz went on a hunting party and was met by a murderous group that included Baibars. On 24 October 1260, Baibars was declared sultan and returned to Cairo. One of his first tasks was to give a religious sanction to his government. Towards that end, he established the Abbasid caliphate in Cairo under one al-Mustansir II. The new caliph died in an attempt to retake Baghdad and was succeeded by al-Hakim I who would rule until 1302 in a caliphate that survived for centuries.

While Baibars was firmly in control of Egypt, Syria was another matter. At Damascus, he was challenged by the Mamluk emir Sinjar al-Halabi, a popular ruler of the city. The Egyptians marched on Damascus and defeated Sinjar on 17 January 1261. The emirs who fought the Mongols, al-Ashraf Musa of Homs and al-Mansur II Muhammad of Hama, were allowed to stay in power. The emir of Kerak al-Mugith Umar was lured by promises and quietly eliminated.

Baibars then turned to exact revenge on the Christians that had helped the Mongols, in particular Hetoum I and Bohemond VI. He took control of Aleppo who was ruled by an intransient Mamluk and began raids into Antioch and Cilicia. But the Mongol presence was too strong and he turned to diplomacy. Given internal Mongol strife, Berke of the Golden Horde was ready to align with Baibars. His entourage was joined by the Seljuk Kaykaus II whose lands had been taken by the Mongols, Byzantines and his own brother Kilij Arslan IV, and this coalition put pressure on the Armenians to behave. (Note: Kaykaus II would be defeated by his brother Kilij Arslan IV at the Battle of Sivrihisar in 1261.)

=== The campaign against the Franks begins ===
The truce between the Franks and Mamluks expired in 1265. Baibars, aware that the Mongols and Christians were considering an alliance, struck immediately. Appearing without warning, he launched the Siege of Caesarea Maritima on 27 February 1265 and had taken the fortress by 5 March. He ordered the city's defensive measures and citadel to be dismantled and set the inhabitants free. A few days later, he turned his attention northward, causing the Fall of Haifa. The inhabitants had wisely fled the city by ship.

The next order of business was the Templar stronghold known as Pilgrim Castle, just south of Haifa. Baibars took the village easily but the fortress resisted and he abandoned the siege on 21 March 1265, moving to Arsuf. The fortress there held a large and well-provisioned garrison of Hospitallers and the Egyptians began their siege on 22 March. The Fall of Arsuf came on 29 April 1265 and the knights were promised safe passage. Nevertheless, Baibars reneged on his offer and took the survivors prisoner, to be sold into slavery.

Concerned about the rapidity of the Mamluk campaign, Hugh III of Cyprus, regent to Conradin, landed a force at Acre on 25 April 1265 to defend the seat of power of the kingdom. Baibars opted out of a siege and returned home to Cairo, writing of his victories to Manfred of Sicily, a friend of Egypt dating back to his father Frederick II.

=== Fall of Antioch ===
In the summer of 1266, two Mamluk armies set out from Egypt to meet their Christian foes. The first was under Baibars himself and was headed to Acre. The second was led by his general Qalawun and its destination was Cilician Armenia.

At Acre, Geoffrey of Sergines had just received reinforcements from Europe and so Baibars diverted his force to Galilee. There, on 13 June 1266, he began the Siege of Safed, attacking the Templars' stronghold. The defenders fought bravely for six weeks before they were tricked into surrendering. The sultan's offer of safe passage was not honored and some 2000 Christians were slaughtered. By capturing the fortress of Safed, Baibars now controlled all of Galilee.

The army led by Qalawun first attacked Tripoli, taking several fortresses that control access to the city, before turning to Cilicia. He was joined by al-Mansur II of Hama. The Armenian defenders were led by Hethum's sons Leo II, the future king, and Thoros, with their flanks guarded by a force of Templars.

On 24 August 1266, the Mamluks engaged the Armenians at the Battle of Mari. Qalawun's army decimated the defenders, killing Thoros and taking Leo II prisoner. The victors that ravaged Cilicia, killing thousands. Hethum, absent pleading for help with the Mongols, hurried back to find his kingdom devasted, a blow from which it would never recover.

Baibar returned twice to engage Acre but found the city too well defended. Then on 4 April 1268, his forces laid siege to Beaufort Castle, a remaining Templar stronghold in southern Lebanon. After a week of intense fighting, the Fall of Beaufort Castle occurred, with the garrison surrendering. The women and children were freed, but the captured men were kept as slaves.

Moving northward, Baibars began the Siege of Antioch on 14 May 1268. The defense led by the constable Simon Mansel who foolishly led a contingent outside the fortified walls and was captured. His pleas to his fellow Antiochenes to surrender were unheeded and the small garrison was overrun on 18 May. The slaughter of residents and capture of booty were unprecedented. The first of the Crusader states had lasted 171 years and its fall foretold of the rapid decline of Christianity in Syria.

=== Failed kings and crusades ===
The nominal king of Jerusalem, Conradin, was beheaded for treason on 29 October 1268 on the orders of Charles I of Anjou, having never set foot in the kingdom. His regent Hugh III of Cyprus had recently ascended to the throne of Cyprus, and became king of Jerusalem as Hugh I. Unlike his predecessors, he went to Acre and attempted to bring order to his rule.

Hugh inherited a kingdom weakened by internal rivalries, competing claims to the throne, and the growing power of the sultan Baibars, who was systematically conquering the remaining Frankish territories. He attempted to strengthen royal authority and unite the divided nobles, but his efforts were hampered by disputes with leading barons and the Italian merchant communities.

Hugh's reign was long, dying on 3 March 1284 after ruling a rapidly shrinking domain. He was succeeded by his son John I of Cyprus and Jerusalem. John was recognized as king only in Tyre and Beirut who were ruled by his relatives. Dying on 20 May 1285, he was succeeded by his brother Henry II of Cyprus who oversaw the collapse of the kingdom, but continued to rule Cyprus.

Lord Edward's Crusade

Several crusades took place during Hugh's reign with minimal impact. Clement IV issued the papal bull Expansis in cruce in August 1265 and the Crusade of 1267 was launched in response. Several hundred crusaders reached the Holy Land, but no military action was seen.

In 1269, the Crusade of the Infants of Aragon was initiated by James I of Aragon, aiming to team with the Mongols to confront the Mamluks. Losing much the force in a storm, the remaining ships did make it to Acre but never connected with the Mongols. The adventure was abandoned.

Louis IX of France then embarked on his second expedition, the Eighth Crusade, in 1270, this time against the Hafsid dynasty in Tunis. Louis died during the expedition on 25 August 1270 and the crusade was abandoned. The future king Edward I of England had taken the cross and was en route to Tunis when Louis died. He then proceeded east, leading what became known as Lord Edward's Crusade, and his army continued on to the Holy Land. There they engaged Baibars' army in minor skirmishes and Edward returned home shortly thereafter.

In 1274, the Second Council of Lyon was convened by Gregory X and was attended by representatives of the Mongol leader Abaqa Khan. The pope called for a crusade with the Mongols against the Mamluks to start in 1278. However, the death of Gregory in 1276 cancelled these plans.

The new pope John XXI maintained an interest in the Holy Land and confirmed the purchase by Charles Iof the pretender Maria of Antioch's claims to the throne of Jerusalem. This despite the fact that the Haute Court had rejected her claim in lieu of that of Hugh III. Charles had Roger of San Serevino installed as bailiff at Acre with the support of the Templars and Venetians on 7 June 1277. Roger served for five years in relative peace before he departed Acre for Sicily.

=== Campaign against the Franks, 1271 ===
Baibars was aware of the preparations for the 1270 crusade and began to implement defensive measures. Learning that Louis' objective was Tunis, he dispatched a force to aid his fellow sultan Muhammad I al-Mustansir. The death of Louis ended his crusade and Egypt could again turn its attention to the Franks. First, to prevent a force landing at Ascalon, he spiked the harbor with boulders.

Throughout this period, Baibars maintained good relations with the Assassins, based partially their joint hatred of the Franks and Mongols, the latter having destroyed their Persian redoubts. To further weaken the Franks, the sultan arranged for the assassination of a leading baron, Philip of Montfort, lord of Tyre. He was felled by an Assassin's blade on 17 August 1270, dealing a major blow to the kingdom.

In early 1271, Baibars began his campaign against Frankish positions in the Levant. His first target was the mighty Hospitaller fortress of Krak des Chevaliers. The Mamluk siege began on 3 March 1271 and by 8 April, the Fall of Krak des Chevaliers was accomplished, a major blow the Franks.

Turning to Tripoli, the Siege of Gibelacar began on 11 May 1271, with the Hospitaller fortress falling after just nine days. At that time, Lord Edward was arriving at Acre, so Baibars signed the Truce of Tripoli with Bohemond VI of Antioch, giving the Franks a ten-year reprieve.

On 8 June 1271, Baibars began his Siege of Montfort Castle, attacking the headquarters of the Teutonic Knights. The defenders held out for two weeks, finally capitulating on 23 June. The survivors were granted safe passage to Acre. At the same time, fearing a combined land–sea attack, the Egyptian fleet launched its Attack on Limassol, which was a fiasco for the Mamluks.

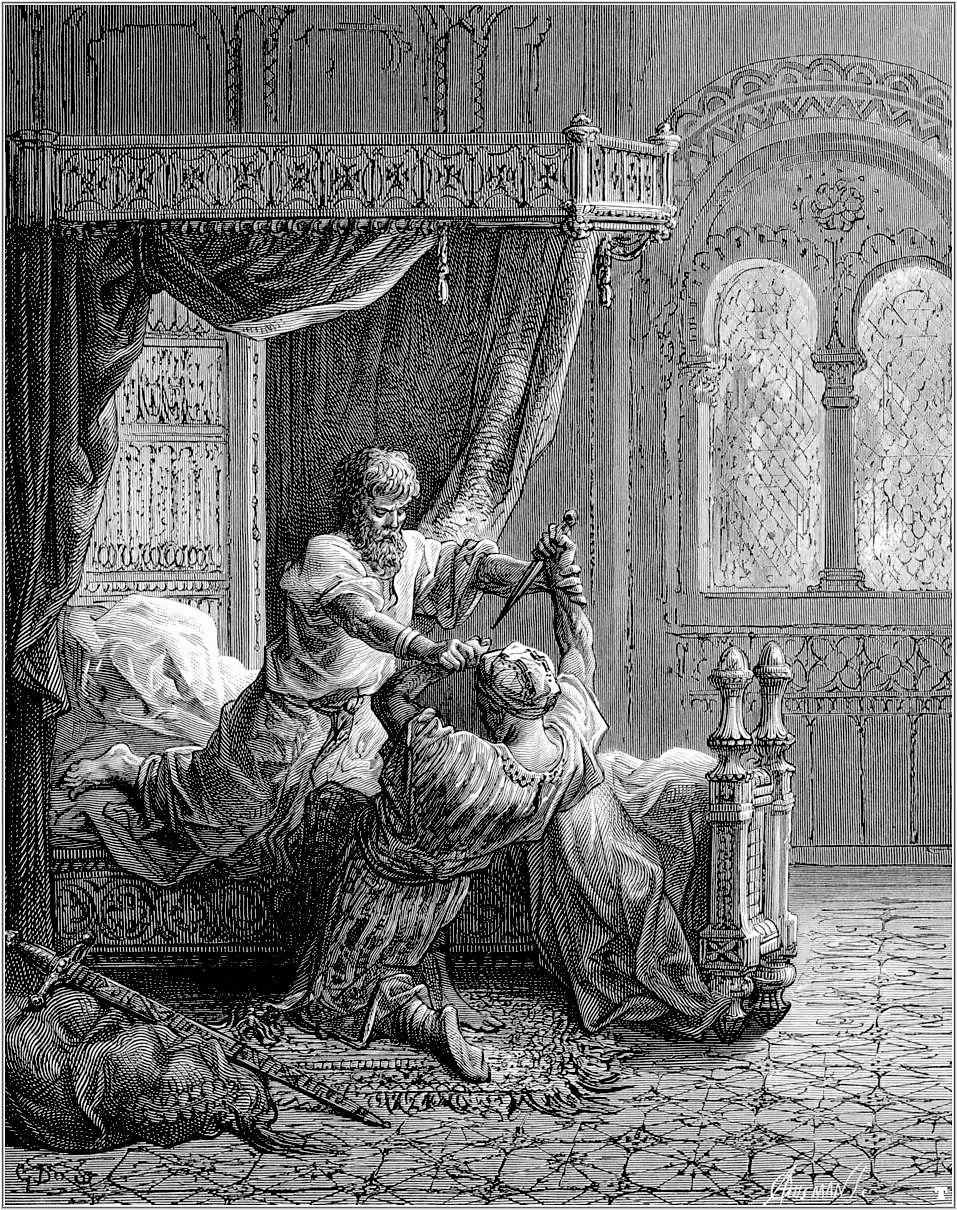
Edward I kills his attempted assassin. Engraving by Gustave Doré

Going on the offensive, the Crusaders led by Lord Edward staged a surprise raid on the Mamluk castle of Qaqun in northern Palestine. Despite initial successes, the raiders were stopped at the Battle of Qaqun on 23 November 1271. This would be the only engagement in Edward's crusade. Baibars sought to retaliate by attacking Acre, but heavy rains stopped him and he returned his army to Cairo.

On 22 May 1272, Hugh III and Baibars signed a truce, to last ten years and ten months. Lord Edward, however, had different ideas, hoping to return with a larger Crusader force. Baibars decided to eliminate him, and on 16 June 1272, an Assassin confronted Edward in his chambers and wounded him with a poisoned dagger. He survived and departed Acre on 22 September 1272.

=== Last years of Baibars ===
With the Franks under a general truce, Baibars could turn his attention to other issues. The Assassins remained a problem, but he soon captured most of their Syrian redoubts and forced them to pay a tribute. The Mongols, though chastened at Ain Jalut, were still a formidable enemy to the north with seemly endless reinforcements. To the south, the Christian kingdom of Makuria was also a nuisance.

Makuria, occupying northern Sudan and the southern portion of Egypt, had been under an uneasy truce with Cairo called the Baqt for centuries. Then in 1272, David of Makuria marched on ʿAydhab, an important city on the route to Mecca. Baibars responses were muted until the Battle of Dongola after which Makuria became a Mamluk vassal.

The Mongols continued their harassment of the Mamluk fortress at al-Bira in southern Turkey, the castle suffering several Mongol sieges since 1265, hoping to gain a foothold in Mamluk territory. Hearing from Damascus that a Mongol force was en route, Baibars deployed his army north on 28 November 1272, reaching the city on 11 December. The Mongol besiegers, supported by the Seljuks, were crushed by the Egyptian force outside the gates at the Battle of al-Bira.

The Mongols tried again at al-Bira in the winter of 1275, again unsuccessfully. By 1277, Baibars' army again marched north into the Sultanate of Rum, where a large force consisting of Mongols, Seljuks and Georgians had gathered under the auspices of Mu'in al-Din Parwana. The Egyptians handily demolished the opposing armies at the Battle of Elbistan on 15 April 1277. Baibars marched unopposed to the capital city of Kayseri and slaughtered all the Christian residents, sparing the Muslims.

Baibars died shortly after Elbistan on 30 June 1277. His sons al-Sa'id Baraka and Solamish successively succeeded him as sultan. In November 1279, Qalawun became sultan and would serve until his death on 10 November 1290. The conquest of the last of the Crusader states in 1291 would fall to his son al-Ashraf Khalil.

== Fall of the kingdom ==
When Qalawun became sultan in 1279, all that remained of the kingdom were the major cities of Acre, Tripoli, Tyre and Beirut along the Mediterranean coast and scattered fortresses inland. Wracked by civil unrest and lack of leadership, the kingdom fell to the Mamluks within twelve years, never to recover.

=== Civil war in Outremer ===
When Bohemond VII came to Tripoli in 1277, the county was already in a weakened state, divided between the Armenian faction led by his mother Sibylla of Armenia and bailiff Bartholomew Mansel, and the Romans led by bishop Paul of Segni and Guy II Embriaco. The Templar grand master Guillaume de Beaujeu sided with the latter and soon there was open warfare. Bohemond attacked Fort Nephin, resulting in the capture of numerous Templars, and was crushed by the Templar response. The truce was broken in 1278 and again Bohemond was defeated. Hospitaller grand master Nicolas Lorgne intervened and arranged another truce.

Nevertheless, Guy II was determined to capture Tripoli. On 12 January 1282, his contingent entered Tripoli expecting to be greeted by his Templar allies, but the commander was absent. Fearing treachery, Guy sought refuge in the house of the Hospitallers. Upon surrendering, Guy and his relatives were taken to Nephin and buried up to their necks in sand in the moat. There they were left to starve to death.

To the south, the government of Roger of San Severino at Acre was resented by the local nobles. In 1277, the Templars under de Beaujeu attempted to enlist John of Montfort as an ally. They initially succeeded in reconciling John with the Venetians, who were allowed to return to Tyre. In 1279, Hugh III brought a large Cypriot army to Tyre, hoping that a display of strength and bribery would be enough to restore his authority over the city. John was on his side, but de Beaujeu's enduring opposition to Hugh frustrated the plan. Upon returning to Cyprus, he seized the Templars' properties and destroyed their fortifications in reprisal. The Templars complained to the pope, who asked Hugh to restore their property, but he declined.

=== Mongols again defeated at Homs ===
Qalawun took until the summer of 1280 to be firmly established as the Mamluk sultan. He was immediately confronted by the Mongol threat who had invaded and taken Aleppo that October. The Mongols had few allies in Syria, limited to the Cilician Armenians and the Hospitallers. On the other hand, Charles I of Anjou maintained good relations with Egypt and so his handpicked bailiff Roger of San Serevino followed suit. Qalawun proposed to Roger a ten-year extension of their truce and he accepted. Bohemond VII soon followed suit.

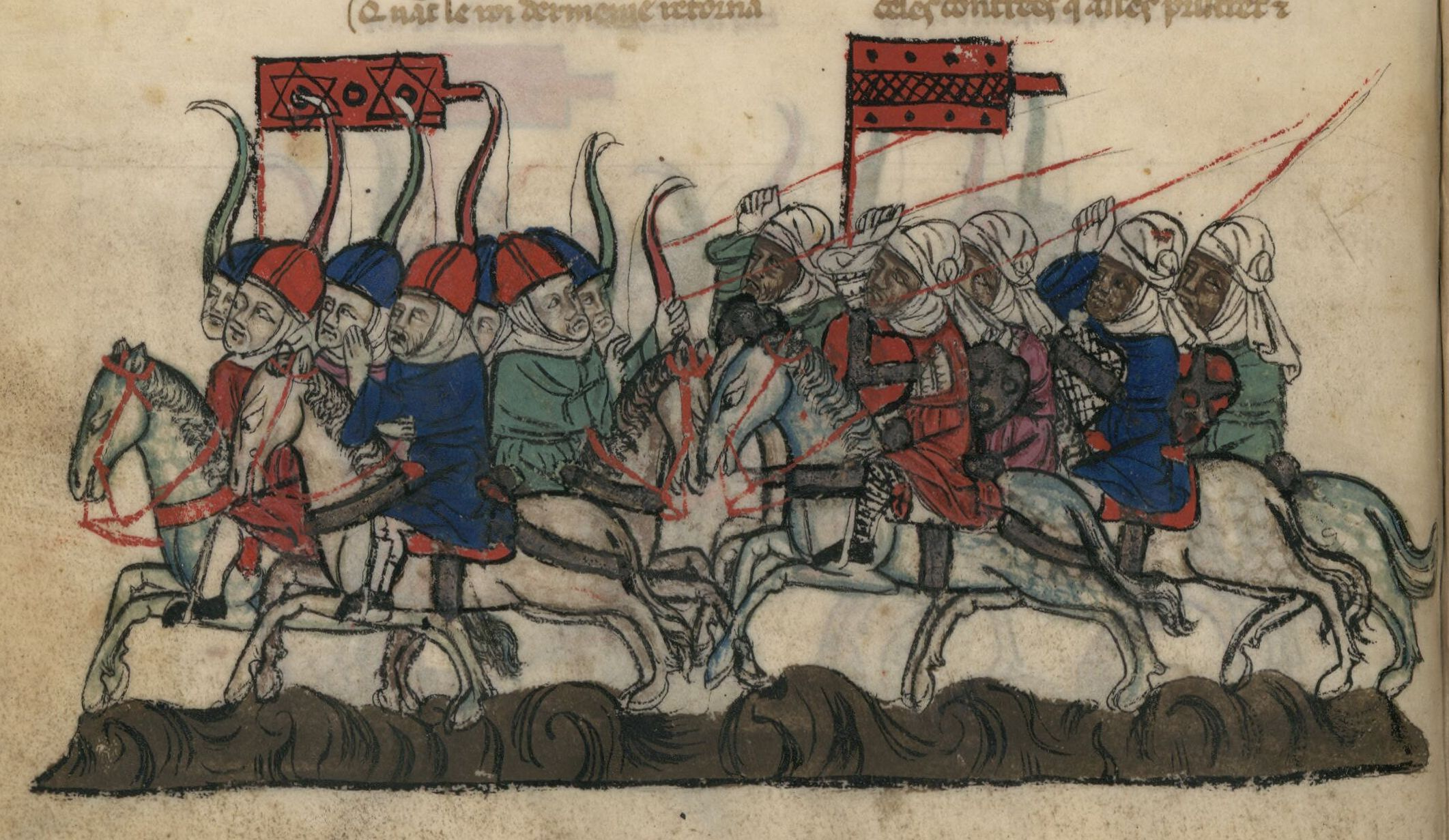
Retreat of the Mongols at the Battle of Homs, 14th-century illuminated manuscript

In the fall of 1281, Qalawun moved his army to Damascus to deal with the Mongols to the north. His main commanders were Sayf al-Din Salar and Shafi' bin Ali el-Masry. The opposing Mongol force was led by Möngke Temür and was supported by the Hospitallers and Leo II of Armenia and Demetrius II of Georgia. The Mamluk and Mongol armies met at Homs, the second such battle there, on 30 October 1281. The Mongols were readily defeated and withdrew quickly, leaving the fight to the Armenians. Outmanned, Leo's troops retreated and Qalawun did not pursue them.

=== Conquest of al-Marqab and Latakia ===
In 1282, the Sicilians rebelled against Charles I of Anjou, causing him to flee the island. His influence over Acre faded and Roger of San Severino was recalled. This took Qalawun by surprise, but he still needed to prevent any Frankish–Mongol alliance. In June 1283, when the truce signed at Caesarea ended, Qalawun offered the seneschal Odo Poilechien to renew it for another ten years. Odo accepted, but he was unsure of his authority and so the treaty was signed in the name of the Commune of Acre and the Templars of Château Pèlerin and Sidon.

Having tamed the Mongols, Qalawun turned his attention to those parts of the kingdom not covered by their recent truce of 1280. The governors Eschive of Beirut and Margaret of Tyre quickly asked for a truce, which was granted. But he really wished to punish to Hospitallers and settled on their one remaining great castle at al-Marqab.

On 17 April 1285, Qalawun led his army to the foot of the castle beginning the siege, bringing a large number of siege engines. After a month with little progress, his engineers dug a mine under one of the towers which soon fell. The garrison surrendered and the Hospitallers were granted safe passage. Qalawun entered the castle on 25 May 1285 and established a garrison there.

The city and port of Latakia, the last remnant of the Principality of Antioch, was not covered by the truce with Tripoli, and so Qalawun sent the emir of Aleppo to take the town. The town fell easily into his hands and, on 20 April 1287, the garrison surrendered, with no relief coming from Christian forces in the area.

=== Tripoli falls to Qalawun ===
Bohemond VII of Antioch died on 19 October 1287 and his heir at Tripoli was Lucia of Tripoli who arrived in early 1288 to claim her inheritance. The city fathers and the Genoese had other ideas and admiral Benedetto I Zaccaria was dispatched to control the situation. Having Genoa in control of the strategic trading port of Tripoli was a direct threat to Egypt's interests and Qalawun took this as an excuse to break the truce with the city. He began to move his forces into Syria in February 1289.

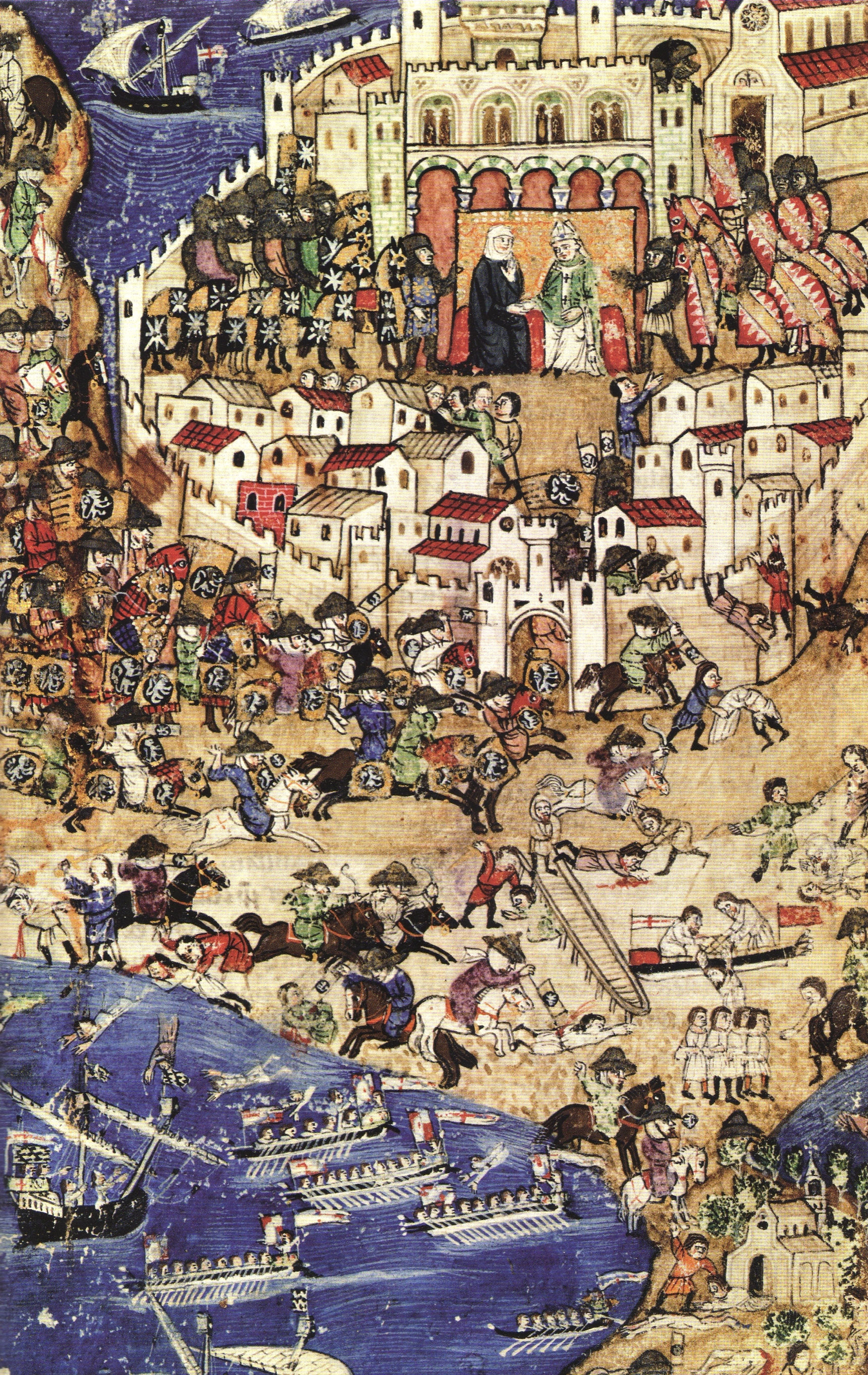
The fall of Tripoli in 1289 triggered frantic preparations to save Acre.

Qalawun started his siege of Tripoli in March 1289, arriving with a large army and siege engines. Lucia led the city's defense with the Templars under the command Geoffrey of Vendac, and the Hospitallers under Matthew of Clermont. A French regiment from Acre was dispatched under Jean I de Grailly and Henry II sent Amalric of Tyre.

Tripoli's fortified towers soon fell under the bombardment and the defenders hastily prepared to flee. The crumbling walls were breached, and the city was captured on 26 April 1289. The population of the city was massacred save those who managed to escape by ship. Those who had taken refuge on a nearby island were captured within a few days. Women and children were taken as slaves.

In the area of Tripoli, only Jebail remained free from the Mamluks, remaining under Peter Embriaco for ten years in exchange for the payment of a tribute to the sultan. Tripoli was razed to the ground, and Qalawun ordered a new city to be built a few miles inland at the foot of Mount Pilgrim. Soon other nearby cities were also captured, including Fort Nephin and Le Boutron.

Three days later, Henry II came to Acre where he met with an envoy from Qalawun. Despite the attack on Tripoli, their 1283 truce was renewed, covering of the kingdom and Cyprus for another ten years, ten months and ten days. Lucia and Leo II of Armenia soon joined the pact. Henry had little faith in Qalawun's word but could not appeal to the Mongols as that would be breach of the truce. He returned to Cyprus in September.

=== Acre under siege ===
The truce between Henry II and Qalawun had restored the peace at Acre but the memory of Tripoli led to an influx of forces from the West. In August 1290, a group of northern Italian soldiers arrived and began causing trouble, unable to be controlled by their commanders. They had come to fight the infidel and began to attack the Muslim merchants and citizens. At the end of August, a riot flared and they began slaying all Muslims. Deciding that every man with a beard was a Muslim, many Christians were also attacked. All that the authorities could do was do was to rescue a few of the Muslims and take them to the safety of the castle. The ringleaders were arrested, but the damage was done.

When Qalawun learned of the massacre he decided to eradicate the Franks from the Holy Land. Acre sent apologies and excuses, his demand that the guilty parties be handed over to him for punishment was not feasible. Believing that he was legally justified in breaking the truce, he mobilized the Egyptian army and sent the Syrian army to the coast of Palestine. Acre was oddly complacent about the looming Mamluk threat, a complacency which they would soon regret.

In early November 1290, Qalawun led his army from Cairo, but he immediately fell ill. Six days later, on 10 November 1290, he died, just five miles from Cairo. He was succeeded by his son al-Ashraf Khalil who promised to continue the campaign against the Franks. Qalawun was laid to rest when his mausoleum was completed, some two months later.

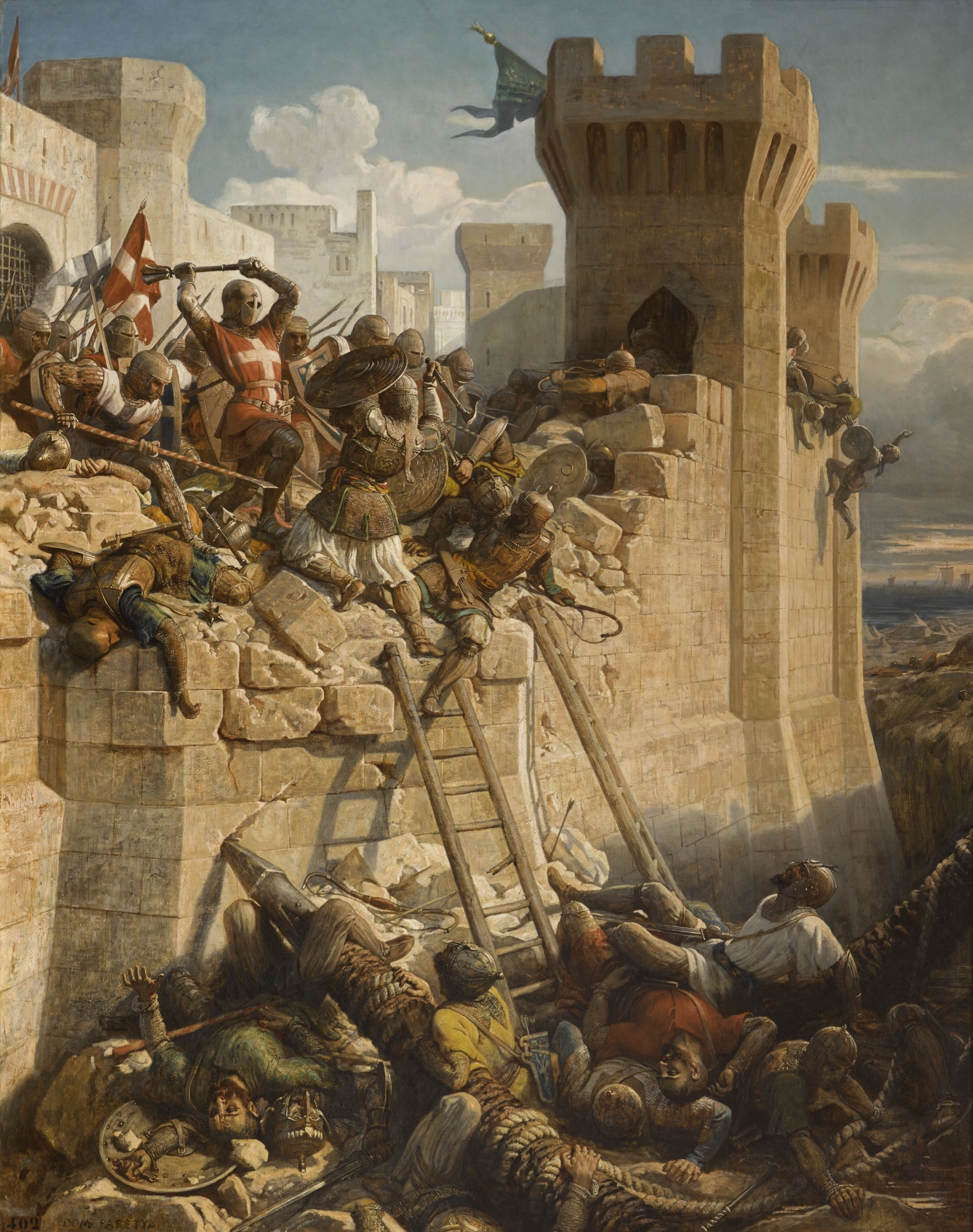
Matthieu de Clermont défend Ptolémaïs en 1291 by Dominique Papety. (Note: Nineteenth century historians frequently referred to Acre as Ptolémaïs.)

With the Mamluk campaign postponed until the spring because of the weather, the nobles of Acre attempted once more at negotiations, sending several envoys to Cairo. Khalil refused to receive them, and they were imprisoned. In March 1291, Khalil set out from Cairo. The Mamluk army, augmented by several Syrian contingents, greatly outnumbered the Franks. The army included substantial siege engines from fortresses across the Mamluk empire. On 5 April 1291, Khalil's army arrived before Acre. The Siege of Acre had begun.

By 15 May 1291, Khalil's troops had taken control of the outer battlements, and Acre's towers began to fall under Mamluk control. With panic rising in the city, women and children began to evacuate by ship. Three days later, on 18 May, the final attack began with a cacophony of war drums and thousands of Muslims breaching the walls. With Acre's defenses punctured, the Franks made a desperate stand to contain the incursion. It was in vain.

The sack of Acre soon began. Hundreds were slaughtered as the Mamluks surged through the city. Desperate Franks tried to escape in any remaining boats. Some got away, including Henry II and Amalric of Tyre, later accused of cowardice. Otto de Grandson took control, commandeering any Venetian ships that he could find. He placed Jean I de Grailly and all soldiers that he could rescue on board, and was the last to board. Jean de Villiers was carried to a boat and sailed to safety. Latin patriarch Nicholas of Hanapes drowned when his overburdened craft sank. Many took refuge in the fortified compounds of the military orders, many holding out for days. The Templar citadel collapsed on 28 May, killing those within. Those under the Hospitallers' protection were promised safe conduct, only to be led out of the city to be slaughtered.

Acre was lost, sealing the fate of the kingdom.

=== Aftermath ===
The other fortified towns in Outremer soon fell. The Mamluks approached Tyre on 19 May 1291 to find it had been abandoned. Sidon was taken in late June although the Templars held the Castle of the Sea until 14 July. The garrison at Beirut surrendered on 31 July, the commanders having been tricked, a day after Haifa fell. The Templars did not defend either Château Pèlerin or Tortosa, which were evacuated on 3 August and 14 August, respectively. British historian Steven Runciman summarized the end of the kingdom succinctly as:

When the whole country was in his power, the sultan al-Ashraf ordered the systematic destruction of every castle on the coast, so that the Franks might never again establish a foothold in Outremer. Nor did they.

The Templars maintained an island fortress of the coast of Tortosa which was lost in the Siege of Ruad in 1302. This put an end to the plans of Jacques de Molay, the new grand master, to invade Tortosa. (Note: Jacques de Molay was burned at the stake in 1314.)

There was some hope that the Mongols could help the West recover their positions in the Holy Land. They had invaded Syria in 1299, defeating the Mamluks at the Battle of Wadi al-Khaznadar. But their Syrian adventure ended with a crushing defeat at the Battle of Marj al-Saffar in 1303.

== Epilog ==
Ther were continued calls for Crusades after the fall of Acre in the century following. These include further plans and efforts for the recovery of the Holy Land, the later popular crusades, crusades against Christians, political crusades, the latter parts of the Reconquista, and the Northern Crusades. Most were unsuccessful, the exception being those in Iberia which was resolved in 1492. Crusades of the 15th century were to continue well into the next century and would include those against the Ottoman Empire.

== See also ==
- Chronology of the Crusades, 1187–1291
- History of Jerusalem during the Kingdom of Jerusalem
- Kingdom of Jerusalem
- Monarchs of Jerusalem
- Timeline of the Kingdom of Jerusalem

== Bibliography ==
- Amitai-Preiss, Reuven (1995). Mongols and Mamluks: The Mamluk-Îlkhânid War, 1260–1281. Cambridge University Press. ISBN 9780521462266.
- Amitai-Preiss, Reuven (1999). The Mongol Empire and Its Legacy. Brill. ISBN 9789004110489.
- Asbridge, Thomas (2010). The Crusades: The Authoritative History of the War for the Holy Land. HarperCollins. ISBN 9780061981364.
- Asbridge, Thomas (2012). The Crusades: The War for the Holy Land. Simon & Schuster. ISBN 9781849836883.
- Atiya, Aziz Suryal (1975). "The Crusade in the Fourteenth Century" ( (PDF)). The Fourteenth and Fifteenth Centuries. pp. 3–26. Archived from the original on 2023-01-04.
- Baldwin, Marshall W. (1985). "Missions to the East in the Thirteenth and Fourteenth Centuries" ( (PDF)). The Impact of the Crusades on the Near East. Univ of Wisconsin Press. pp. 452–518. ISBN 9780299091446. Archived from the original on 2023-01-04.
- Barber, Malcolm (2012). The Crusader States. Yale University Press. ISBN 9780300189315.
- Bosworth, Clifford Edmund (2004). The New Islamic dynasties: A Chronological and Genealogical Manual. Edinburgh University Press. ISBN 9780748621378.
- Cahen, Claude (1969a). "The Turks in Iran and Anatolia before the Mongol Invasions" ( (PDF)). The Later Crusades, 1189–1311. Univ of Wisconsin Press. pp. 661–692. ISBN 9780299048440. Archived from the original on 2023-01-04.
- Cahen, Claude (1969b). "The Mongols and the Near East" ( (PDF)). The Later Crusades, 1189–1311. Univ of Wisconsin Press. pp. 715–734. ISBN 9780299048440. Archived from the original on 2023-01-04.
- Donovan, Joseph P. (1950). Pelagius and the Fifth Crusade. University of Pennsylvania Press. ISBN 9781512801491.
- Edbury, Peter W. (1991). The Kingdom of Cyprus and the Crusades, 1191–1374. Cambridge University Press. ISBN 9780521268769.
- Furber, Elizabeth Chapin (1969). "The Kingdom of Cyprus, 1191–1291" ( (PDF)). The Later Crusades, 1189–1311. Univ of Wisconsin Press. pp. 599–629. ISBN 978-0-299-04844-0. Archived from the original on 2023-01-04.
- Geanakoplos, Deno John (1975). Byzantium and the Crusades, 1261–1354 (PDF). A History of the Crusades (Setton), Volume III.
- Gibb, H. A. R. (1969). "The Aiyūbids" ( (PDF)). The Later Crusades, 1189–1311. pp. 693–714. Archived from the original on 2023-01-04.
- Hardwicke, Mary Nickerson (1969). "The Crusader States, 1192–1243" ( (PDF)). The Later Crusades, 1189–1311. pp. 522–556. Archived from the original on 2023-01-04.
- Housley, Norman (1992). The Later Crusades, 1274-1580: From Lyons to Alcazar. Oxford University Press. ISBN 9780198221371.
- Jackson, Peter (2005). The Mongols and the West: 1221–1410. Pearson Longman. ISBN 9780582368965.
- Lewis, Bernard (1969). "The Ismā'īlites and the Assassins" ( (PDF)). The First Hundred Years. pp. 99–134. Archived from the original on 2023-01-04.
- Lower, Michael (2005). The Barons' Crusade: A Call to Arms and Its Consequences. University of Pennsylvania Press. ISBN 9780812238730.
- Lower, Michael (2018). The Tunis Crusade of 1270: A Mediterranean History. Oxford University Press. ISBN 9780198744320.
- McNeal, Edgar H.; Wolff, Robert Lee (1969). "The Fourth Crusade" ( (PDF)). The Later Crusades, 1189–1311. pp. 153–186. Archived from the original on 2023-01-04.
- Murray, Alan V., ed. (2006). The Crusades: An Encyclopedia. ABC-CLIO. ISBN 9781576078624. Archived from the original on 2023-03-26.
- Nersessian, Sirarpie Der (1969). "The Kingdom of Cilician Armenia" ( (PDF)). The Later Crusades, 1189–1311. pp. 630–660. Archived from the original on 2023-01-04.
- Northrup, Linda (1998). From Slave to Sultan: The Career of Al-Manṣūr Qalāwūn and the Consolidation of Mamluk Rule in Egypt and Syria (678–689 A.H./1279–1290 A.D.). Franz Steiner. ISBN 9783515068611.
- Painter, Sidney (1969). "The Crusade of Theobald of Champagne and Richard of Cornwall, 1239-1241" ( (PDF)). The Later Crusades, 1189–1311. pp. 463–486. Archived from the original on 2023-01-04.
- Richard, Jean C. (1979). The Latin Kingdom of Jerusalem. Amsterdam, North Holland. ISBN 9780444852625.
- Richard, Jean C. (1999). The Crusades, c. 1071 – c. 1291. Cambridge University Press. ISBN 9780521625661.
- Runciman, Steven (1954). A History of the Crusades, Volume Three: The Kingdom of Acre and the Later Crusades. Cambridge University Press.
- Runciman, Steven (1969). "The Crusader States, 1243–1291" ( (PDF)). The Later Crusades, 1189–1311. pp. 557–598. Archived from the original on 2023-01-04.
- Setton, Kenneth M. (1969–1989). A History of the Crusades. Madison: University of Wisconsin Press.
- Sinor, Denis (1975). "The Mongols and Western Europe" ( (PDF)). The Fourteenth and Fifteenth Centuries. pp. 513–544. Archived from the original on 2023-01-04.
- Sterns, Indrikis (1985). "The Teutonic Knights in the Crusader States" ( (PDF)). The Impact of the Crusades on the Near East. pp. 315–378. Archived from the original on 2023-01-04.
- Strayer, Joseph R. (1969). "The Crusades of Louis IX" ( (PDF)). The Later Crusades, 1189–1311. pp. 487–521. Archived from the original on 2023-01-04.
- Van Cleve, Thomas C. (1969a). "The Fifth Crusade" ( (PDF)). The Later Crusades, 1189–1311. pp. 377–428. Archived from the original on 2023-01-04.
- Van Cleve, Thomas C. (1969b). "The Crusade of Frederick II" ( (PDF)). The Later Crusades, 1189–1311. pp. 429–462. Archived from the original on 2023-01-04.
- Wieruszowski, Helene (1969). "The Norman Kingdom of Sicily and the Crusades" ( (PDF)). The Later Crusades, 1189–1311. pp. 3–44. Archived from the original on 2023-01-04.
- Wolff, Robert L.; Hazard, Harry W., eds. (1969). The Later Crusades, 1189–1311. Setton, Kenneth M. (ed.), A History of the Crusades, University of Wisconsin Press. ISBN 9780299048440.
- Ziada, Mustafa M. (1969). "The Mamluk Sultans to 1293" ( (PDF)). The Later Crusades, 1189–1311. Univ of Wisconsin Press. pp. 735–758. ISBN 978-0-299-04844-0. Archived from the original on 2023-01-04.
