= Ibn Abd al-Zahir =

Egyptian chancery scribe, poet and historian (1223–1293)

Muḥyī d-Dīn Ibn Abd al-Zahir محيي الدين بن عبد الظاهر
- Born: 1223; Cairo, Egyptian Mamluk Sultanate (now Egypt)
- Died: 1293 (aged 69–70); Cairo, Egyptian Mamluk Sultanate (now Egypt)
- Resting place: Cairo
- Occupations: Chancery scribe, Arabic Poet and Historian
- Writing career
- Pen name: Ibn Abd al-Zahir
- Language: Arabic
- Period: 7th Islamic century (Mamluk era)

Ibn Abd al-Zahir (Egyptian Arabic: محي الدين بن عبد الظاهر, romanized: Muḥyī d-Dīn ibn ʿAbd aẓ-Ẓāhir; 1223–1293) was an Egyptian chancery scribe, poet and historian during the Mamluk period. Several of his works survive, including three biographies of the early Mamluk sultans Baybars, al-Mansur Qalawun and al-Ashraf Khalil. In addition, a diwan of his poetry survives, as does a collection of letters written by Saladin's vizier al-Qāḍī al-Fāḍil which he compiled, and parts of a geographical work entitled Kitāb al-Rawḍah al-Bahīyah which was used extensively by the later historian Al-Maqrizi for his work "Al-Mawāʿiẓ wa-l-iʾtibār bi-dhikr al-khiṭaṭ wa al-athār." His son Fath al-Din Ibn Abd al-Zahir and grandson Ala al-Din Ibn Abd al-Zahir were also important chancery scribes of the Mamluk period, as was his nephew Shafiʾ ibn ʾAli who also wrote three surviving biographies of sultans Baybars, Qalawun and al-Nasir Muhammad.

== Writings ==
- al-Rawḍ al-zāhir fī sīrat al-Malik al-Ẓāhir (ed. ʿAbd al-ʿAzīz al-Khuwayṭir, Riyadh, 1976; partial English translation in Baybars I of Egypt, ed. Syedah Fatima Sadequi, London, 1958))
- Tashrīf al-ayyām wa-l-ʿuṣūr bi-sīrat al-Malik al-Manṣūr (ed. Murad Kāmil, Cairo, 1961)
- al-Alṭāf al-khafiyya min al-sīra al-sharīfa al-sulṭāniyya al-Malikiyya al-Ashrafiyya, published in Ur ʿAbd Allah B. ʿAbd eẓ-Ẓâhir’s biografi over sultanen el-malik al-Aśraf Halîl (ed. Axel Moberg, Lund, 1902)
- Al-Durr an-naẓīm min tarassul ʿAbd al-Raḥīm (ed. Aḥmad Aḥmad Badawī, Cairo, 1959)
- al-Rawḍa l-bahiyya al-zāhira fī khiṭaṭ al-Muʿizziyya l-Qāhira (ed. Ayman Fuʾād Sayyid, Cairo, 1996).
- Dīwān: Dirāsa wa-taḥqīq (ed. Gharīb Muḥammad ʿAlī Aḥmad, Cairo, 1990)
