= Bohemond of Botron =

Bohemond of Botron (1199 – after October 1244) was a son of Bohemond III of Antioch and by marriage, Lord of Botrun in the County of Tripoli.

== Biography ==
He was the son of Bohemond III of Antioch and his fourth wife, Isabella of Farabel.

Whilst still a child, Bohemond was betrothed to Isabella of Botrun, the only daughter of Cecilia of Botrun and Plivain of Pisa, and heiress to the lordship of Botrun. Bohemond was installed Jure uxoris as lord of Botrun.

In October 1244, he participated in the Battle of La Forbie alongside his eldest son, John. The battle ended in defeat, and he died a captive of the Muslims along with his son shortly afterwards.

With Isabella of Botrun, he had four children:

- John (d.after 1244)
- William (d. after 1262), lord of Botrun and Constable of Jerusalem, he married Agnes of Sidon, daughter of Balian Grenier.
- James (d.1277)
- Isabel, married Meillour of Ravendel, lord of Maraclea.
