= Lordship of Botrun =

The Lordship of Botrun was a fief around the small town of Botrun (now Batroun in Lebanon) in the County of Tripoli. The crusaders occupied Botrun in 1104, then the lordship was formed in 1115, until it was seized by the Mamluks of Qalawun in 1289.

== Lords of Botrun ==
- Raymond of Agoult, before 1174
- William Dorel, until 1174
- Cecilia (Lucia), 1174–1181/1206; married Plivain
- Isabella, 1206–1244; married Bohemond of Botron, son of Bohemond III
- William, 1244–1262
- John I, 1262–1277
- Rudolf (Rostain), 1277–1289

== Sources ==
- Barber, Malcolm (2012). The Crusader States. Yale University Press. ISBN 978-0-300-11312-9.
- Lewis, Kevin James (2017). The Counts of Tripoli and Lebanon in the Twelfth Century: Sons of Saint-Gilles. Routledge. ISBN 978-1-4724-5890-2.
- Runciman, Steven (1989a). A History of the Crusades, Volume II: The Kingdom of Jerusalem and the Frankish East, 1100–1187. Cambridge University Press. ISBN 0-521-06163-6.
- Runciman, Steven (1989b). A History of the Crusades, Volume III: The Kingdom of Acre and the Later Crusades. Cambridge University Press. ISBN 0-521-06163-6.
