= Post miserabile =

1198 crusade encyclical

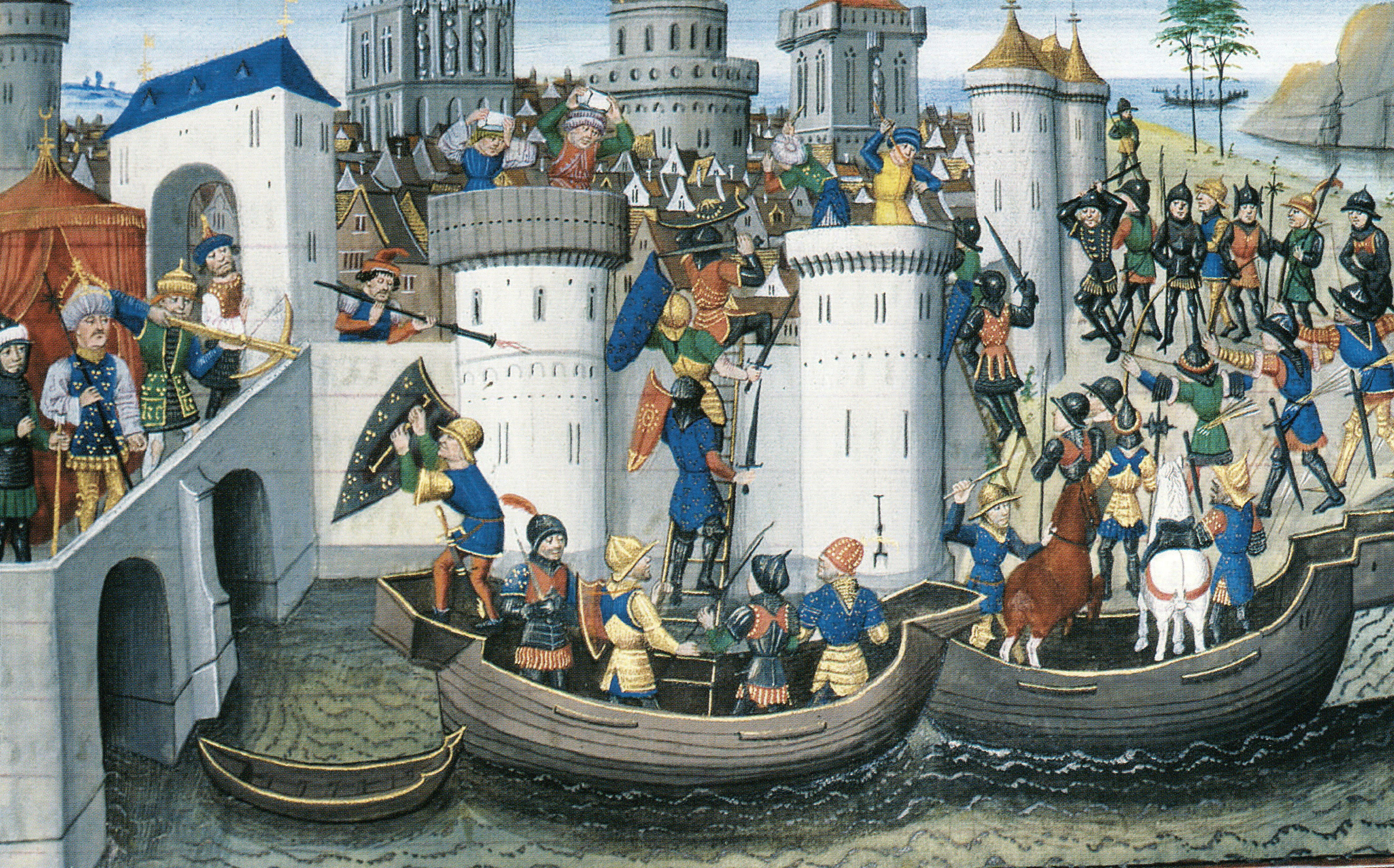
The Conquest of Constantinople by the Crusaders: One of the most dramatic moments in the Fourth Crusade.

Post miserabile (Latin: Sadly, after) is an encyclical issued by Pope Innocent III on 15 August 1198 calling for what would subsequently be referred to as the Fourth Crusade. It was Innocent's first crusade bull, although it was not issued in response to any single event, such as setback in the East. Compared to the crusade-related encyclicals written by his predecessors, Post miserabile is more organisational in tone, foreshadowing the bureaucratic and administrative changes Innocent would make to the crusading institutions.

== Background ==
Upon Innocent's accession to the papacy in 1198, the preaching of a Fourth Crusade ostensibly became one of the main goals of his pontificate. However, both the kings of England and France were at war, and several other states did not heed the pontiff's call to take up arms for a crusade. Knowing that most European monarchs were preoccupied with their own affairs of state, the purpose of Post miserabile was to settle their disputes and focus attention on the East.

Post miserabile was Innocent's first general letter (or bull) on crusading. It was addressed to the archbishops of Lyon, Narbonne, and Vienne, as well as the metropolitans of England, Germany, Hungary, and Sicily.

== Outline ==
Innocent begins his letter by describing the present plight in the Holy Land, including the loss of the True Cross as well as the invasion of Jerusalem and the killing of Christians by Muslim forces. He emphasises the fact that all Christians are morally obliged to participate in a crusade, before going on to criticise Europe's rulers for their inability to act.

Innocent then appoints the cardinal priest of Santa Prassede, Sofferdo, and the cardinal deacon of Santa Maria in Via Lata, Peter Capuano, as papal legates who would preach and organise the crusade, specifically encouraging them to target the kings of England and France to assist.

Unlike earlier crusade-related encyclicals such as Quantum praedecessores and Audita tremendi, Post miserabile also gives a great deal of organisational instructions on how the crusade is to be run and established. In an attempt to encourage a revival in crusading, the letter lists the spiritual privileges and benefits that could be had from undertaking to go to the Holy Land. Those going on the crusade at someone else's expense, in addition to those financing the crusade but not going on it themselves, would receive the indulgence. On the other hand, those going on the crusade at their own expense would receive both the indulgence as well as the salutis augmentum (an increase in salvation).

The indulgence was instrumental in establishing a basis for the crusade and due to the preaching of Fulk of Neuilly, a crusading army was finally organised at a tournament held at Écry-sur-Aisne by Count Thibaut of Champagne in 1199.
