= Nicholas of Hanapes =

13th-century Latin patriarch of Jerusalem

Nicholas of Hanapes (died on 18 May 1291) was a French prelate of the Catholic Church who became the last Latin patriarch in the Kingdom of Jerusalem. He was appointed in 1288 by Pope Nicholas IV and during his brief patriarchate wielded a considerable political power. He drowned under unclear circumstances during the sack of Acre.

== Early career ==
Nicholas hailed from Hanapes in the Ardennes. He was born probably in the first half of the 13th century. He entered the Dominican Order in the convent of his hometown before going to study at the Couvent des Jacobins in Paris. Between 1260 and 1278 he compiled the Liber de exemplis sacre scripturae ("Book of examples from scripture"), which became popular in England in the following century. (Note: The book was published in 1477 as Biblia pauperum ("Bible of the Poor"), in which biblical stories inspiring the love of virtue are grouped in 134 alphabetically arranged chapters, and attributed to Bonaventure. After 1533, it was published under the name of its true author, Nicholas. Among the various titles under which it was published is Virtutum vitiorumque Exempla.) Nicholas served as a penitentiary to Pope Nicholas IV.

== Patriarchate ==
Nicholas IV, who was elected pope on 22 February 1288, appointed Nicholas of Hanapes to the Latin Patriarchate of Jerusalem on 30 April 1288. This circumvented the right of the canons of the Holy Sepulchre to elect their patriarch. The pope bestowed on the new patriarch privileges surpassing those of his predecessors. Because the king of Jerusalem, Henry II of Cyprus, was for the most part absent from the mainland, Patriarch Nicholas enjoyed a considerable political power. Indeed, he acted as a virtual head of state. For example, the commanders of the fleet sent by the pope to Acre–the capital of the Kingdom of Jerusalem, then a rump state–were placed under the patriarch's authority. One of the pope's last requests to the patriarch was to establish the Inquisition in the Latin East.

On 26 April 1289, Tripoli was captured by the Mamluks of Egypt. Nicholas took part in composing the delegation sent to Rome to request aid. The pope responded by imposing a complete trade embargo on Egypt. The population of Acre protested because their livelihoods depended on trade with Egypt. Patriarch Nicholas consequently allowed the trade of goods other than horses and war materials.

Nicholas's patriarchate was cut short by the Mamluk invasion of the kingdom in April 1291. Nicholas took charge of the defense of the besieged Acre, but the Lanercost Chronicle alleges that he was not adept. As Acre was overrun on 18 May, Nicholas made for the harbor, where the weather was bad and the waves were high. Sources disagree on how Nicholas met his fate. The Templar of Tyre narrates that the patriarch tried to board a Venetian ship, seized a sailor by the hand, but slipped and drowned; his valuables turning up aboard the vessel led to suspicions of foul play. According to the account of Thadeus of Naples, the patriarch tried to save as many poor people as possible, but his overloaded boat capsized, killing everyone aboard.
