= Battle of Machghara =

1217 battle between the Kingdom of Hungary and Ayyubid Dynasty

- Part of the Fifth Crusade
Date	15 December 1217
Location	Machghara
Result	Ayyubid victory

Belligerents
Kingdom of Hungary	Ayyubid Dynasty

Commanders and leaders
Dionysus (POW)	Unknown

Strength
500 cavalry	Unknown

Casualties and losses
All but 3 killed or captured	Unknown

The Battle of Machghara occurred on December 15, 1217, as part of the Fifth Crusade. In it, an army led by a Hungarian nobleman was ambushed and defeated in Machghara.

== Background ==
Shortly after the failed siege of Mount Tabor, a handful of adventurous crusaders, mainly Hungarians, decided to launch a raid against the castle of Beaufort. The Hungarian leader, a certain rich nobleman named Dionysus, led a force of 500 cavalry. Arab sources claim that they were led by the nephew of the Hungarian king, Andrew.

== Battle ==
The Balian of Sidon tried to warn the Hungarians of the difficulties in the mountainous region, inhabited by mountaineers who harassed the Crusader territory of Sidon but paid no attention to it. The Hungarians set out and arrived in Machghara, located between the mountains, whose seat is approximately halfway between Sidon and Damascus. The inhabitants learned of the upcoming raid and evacuated the town. The Hungarians rested there for three days. On December 15, the Muslims attacked the Hungarians, who were taken by surprise, killing and capturing a large number of men and horses. Their leader fell prisoner.

Those who escaped the massacre retreated towards Sidon. During the battle, the Hungarians captured a Muslim prisoner called al-Jamus, and he guided them to a safe route in exchange for his freedom, to which they agreed. However, the Crusaders entered a deep ravine, where they were chased by Muslims and slaughtered. The Hungarians executed the Muslim prisoner for his treachery. Few of the Crusaders survived the massacre. According to Abu Shama, only 3 out of 500 Crusaders survived and reached Sidon. The prisoners were then taken to Damascus.

The battle marked the end of the Hungarian Crusade. King Andrew began preparations to return home.

== Sources ==
- Bánlaky, József. "Andrew's crusade in 1217–1218" (in Hungarian). A Magyar nemzet hadtörténelme.
- Röhricht, Reinhold (1898). History of the Kingdom of Jerusalem (1100–1291) (in German). Wagner.
- Setton, Kenneth (1969). Robert Lee Wolff; Harry W. Hazard (eds.). A History of the Crusades, Volume II: The Later Crusades, 1189–1311 (PDF). The University of Wisconsin Press.
- Veszprémy, László (2002). The Crusade of Andrew II, King of Hungary, 1217–1218. pp. 87–110.
