= Shafi' bin Ali el-Masry =

Egyptian writer, historian, biographer, poet and military commander (1251 – 1330)

- Born: Nasir el-Din Shafi' bin Ali bin Abbas el-Kinani el-Asqalani el-Masry (ناصر الدين شافع بن علي بن عباس الكناني العسقلاني المصري); 1251; Cairo, Egyptian Sultanate
- Died: 1330 (aged 78–79); Cairo, Egyptian Sultanate
- Occupations: historian, biographer, writer, poet, military commander
- Relatives: Mohie el-Din bin Abdel Zahir (uncle); Fath el-Din bin Abdel Zahir (cousin)

Nasir el-Din Shafi’ bin Ali bin Abbas el-Kinani el-Asqalani el-Masry (Egyptian Arabic: ناصر الدين شافع بن علي بن عباس الكناني العسقلاني المصري) (1330 – 1251), commonly known as Shafi' bin Ali el-Masry was an Egyptian writer, historian, biographer, poet and military commander who participated in the conquests of the Egyptian army during the era of Sultan El-Mansur Seif el-Din Qalawun.

== Early life ==
Shafi' bin Ali was born in 1251 in Cairo. He was raised by a family famous for its knowledge and culture, and it seems that he became attached to his uncle Mohie el-Din bin Abdel Zahir, and his son Fath el-Din bin Abdel Zahir. There is no clearer evidence of this than his saying about his uncle Mohie el-Din and his loyalty to him:

“And from whom I lived, I advanced, and from whose hands I graduated.”

== Second battle of Homs and injury ==
In 1281, the Egyptian army, led by the Egyptian Sultan El-Mansur Qalawun, moved towards the Levant to confront the Mongol Ilkhanid armies near Homs. Shafi’ bin Ali was a companion of El-Mansur Qalawun, because he was at that time in charge of the Egyptian Diwan al-Insha (or letters). Shafi’ bin Ali fought the Mongols with great courage and was one of the heroes of the final attack on the Mongols, but during the fighting Shafi’ bin Ali was hit in the temple by a Mongol arrow, which led to his blindness. After that, Shafi’ bin Ali turned to writing.

== Writing ==
Shafi' bin Ali wrote many books, the most famous of which is the biography of Sultan El-Mansur Qalawun, which is the book known as al-Faḍl al-maʼthūr min sīrat al-Sulṭān al-Malik al-Manṣūr. He also wrote about the biographies of El-Zahir Baybars, El-Ashraf Khalil bin Qalawun, and El-Nasir Mahammad bin Qalawun.

His books on the history of the sultans of the Egyptian Sultanate were considered one of the most important historical books about the era of the Egyptian Sultanate, known as the Mamluk era.

== Death ==
After a long life, at the age of 79, Shafi’ bin Ali el-Masry died during the era of the Egyptian Sultan El-Nasir Mahammad bin Qalawun in 1330. Upon his death, Shafi' bin Ali el-Masry left behind 20 bookcases full of books.
