= William of Botron =

Lord of Botron

William of Botron (died after 1262) was Lord of Botron (1244–1262) in the County of Tripoli, and Constable of Jerusalem (1258–1262).

== Life ==
William of Botron was the second son of Isabella of Botron and her husband Bohemond of Botron. His father and his older brother John were taken prisoner by the Muslims at the Battle of La Forbie on October 18, 1244, where they both died, whereupon William took over the lordship.

In 1258, he was appointed Constable of Jerusalem. In 1262, he acted as mediator between the Templars and the Hospitallers. The document dated December 19, 1262, signed by him in this context, was the last sign of life from him.

=== Marriage and issue ===
He was married to Agnes of Sidon, daughter of Count of Sidon Balian Grenier, with whom he had a son:

- John (died 1277), Lord of Botron, married Lucie Embriaco of Gibelet.

== Sources ==
- du Cange, Charles (1869). Les Familles d'outre-mer (in French). Paris: Emmanuel Guillaume-Rey. Imprimerie Impériale.
- Runciman, Steven (1989). A History of the Crusades, Volume III: The Kingdom of Acre and the Later Crusades. Cambridge University Press. ISBN 0-521-06163-6.
