= Plivain =

Plivain, also known as Plivano or Pleban, was the lord of Botrun (now Batroun in Lebanon) in the County of Tripoli from around 1180 to around 1206. He was a merchant from Pisa who settled in the county in the late 1170s. He seized Botrun through his marriage to its heiress, Lucia. According to a late source, he bribed Lucia's suzerain, Count Raymond III of Tripoli, into allowing the marriage. He fell into captivity in the Battle of Hattin on 4 July 1187.

== Life ==
Plivain was a wealthy merchant from Pisa who settled in the County of Tripoli. His presence in the county was first recorded on 9 August 1179. He married Lucia, the only daughter of William Dorel, Lord of Botrun, and thus seized the lordship, around 1180. According to a folkloristic story recorded in the Estoire de Eracles, to seize her hand, Plivain had offered her weight in gold to Count Raymond III of Tripoli, her suzerain. Raymond accepted the offer, although he had promised the hand of the first wealthy heiress in the county to a Flemish knight, Gerard of Ridefort. Plivain was first mentioned as the lord of Botrun in March 1181.

Plivain participated in the Battle of Hattin and fell into captivity on 4 July 1187. Although the Estoire de Eracles claimed that Saladin captured Botrun, historian Kevin J. Lewis argues that Plivain paid a huge ransom for his release and retained his lordship. He was last mentioned as lord of Botrun in 1206.

== Sources ==
- Barber, Malcolm (2012). The Crusader States. Yale University Press. ISBN 978-0-300-11312-9.
- Hamilton, Bernard (2000). The Leper King and His Heirs: Baldwin IV and the Crusader Kingdom of Jerusalem. Cambridge University Press. ISBN 978-0-521-64187-6.
- Lewis, Kevin James (2017). The Counts of Tripoli and Lebanon in the Twelfth Century: Sons of Saint-Gilles. Routledge. ISBN 978-1-4724-5890-2.
- Runciman, Steven (1989). A History of the Crusades, Volume II: The Kingdom of Jerusalem and the Frankish East, 1100-1187. Cambridge University Press. ISBN 0-521-06163-6.
- Ernoul, "Chronique d’Ernoul et de Bernard le Trésorier", a c. di Mas Latrie, Paris 1871. "Estoire d’Eracles", in "Recueil des Historiens des Croisades: Historiens Occidentaux" [RHCOcc], pp. 51-52, 114.
- M. Chiaverini, "Il ‘Porto Pisano’ alla foce del Don tra il XIII e XIV secolo", Pisa MARICH, 2000, p. 49 e n. 152.
