= Kingdom of Jerusalem =

Crusader state in the Levant from 1099 to 1291

Kingdom of Jerusalem: Regnum Hierosolymitanum (Latin); Roiaume de Jherusalem (Old French)
- 1099–1187; 1192–1291
- Royal arms

- Map of the territorial extent of the Crusader states (Edessa, Antioch, Tripoli, and Jerusalem) in the Holy Land in 1135, shortly before the Second Crusade.
- Capital: Jerusalem (1099–1187); Tyre (1187–1191); Acre (1191–1291)
- Official languages: Latin
- Common languages: Old French, Italian, Medieval Greek, Arabic, Aramaic
- Religion: Latin Church; Eastern Christianity; Islam (minority); Judaism
- Government: Feudal monarchy
- Monarch
  - 1099–1100 (first): Godfrey of Bouillon
  - 1285–1291 (last): Henry II
- Legislature: Haute Cour
- Historical era: High Middle Ages
  - First Crusade: 1096–1099
  - Capture of Jerusalem: 15 July 1099
  - First Fall of Jerusalem: 2 October 1187
  - Third Crusade: 1189–1192
  - Sixth Crusade: 1228–1229
  - Barons' Crusade: 1239–1241
  - Second Fall of Jerusalem: 15 July 1244
  - Fall of Acre: 18 May 1291

Population
  - 1131: 250,000
  - 1180 (Note: Including 120,000–140,000 Franks.): 480,000–650,000
- Currency: Bezant, Denier
Preceded by	Succeeded by
Jund Filastin; Jund al-Urdunn	Ayyubid dynasty; Mamluk Sultanate
- Today part of: Israel; Palestine; Lebanon; Jordan; Egypt

The Kingdom of Jerusalem, also known as the Crusader Kingdom, was one of the Crusader states established in the Levant immediately after the First Crusade. It lasted for almost 200 years, from the accession of Godfrey of Bouillon in 1099 until the fall of Acre in 1291. Its history is divided into two periods with a brief interruption in its existence, beginning with its collapse after the siege of Jerusalem in 1187 and its restoration after the Third Crusade in 1192.

The original kingdom lasted from 1099 to 1187 before being almost entirely overrun by the Ayyubid Sultanate under Saladin. Following the Third Crusade, it was re-established in Acre in 1192. The re-established state is commonly known as the "Second Kingdom of Jerusalem" or alternatively as the "Kingdom of Acre" after its new capital city. Acre remained the capital for the rest of its existence, even during the two decades that followed the Crusaders' establishment of partial control over Jerusalem during the Sixth Crusade, through the diplomacy of Emperor Frederick II.

The vast majority of the Crusaders who settled the Kingdom of Jerusalem were from the Kingdom of France, as were the knights and soldiers who made up the bulk of the steady flow of reinforcements throughout its 200-year existence; its rulers and elite were therefore predominantly French. Over the course of its history, the Kingdom of Jerusalem became increasingly dependent on and influenced by the Italian maritime republics of Venice and Genoa, especially after the kingdom's capital effectively moved to the port city of Acre.

== Geographic boundaries ==
At first, the kingdom was little more than a loose collection of towns and cities captured during the First Crusade, but at its height in the mid-12th century, the kingdom encompassed roughly the territory of modern-day Israel, Palestine, and the southern half of Lebanon, including Beirut. From the Mediterranean Sea, the kingdom extended in a thin strip of land from Beirut in the north to the Sinai Desert in the south; into modern Jordan and Syria in the east, and towards Egypt in the west. Three other Crusader states founded during and after the First Crusade were located further north: the County of Edessa (1097–1144), the Principality of Antioch (1098–1268), and the County of Tripoli (1109–1289). While all were independent, they were closely tied to Jerusalem. Beyond these to the north and west lay the states of Armenian Cilicia and the Byzantine Empire, with which Jerusalem had a close relationship in the 12th century. Further east, various Muslim emirates were ultimately allied with the Abbasid Caliphate in Baghdad. The kingdom was increasingly dominated by the Italian city-states of Venice and Genoa. Their naval strength was essential for transporting troops, food, and goods, and their financial resources were often decisive in sustaining the kingdom's military campaigns. As the kingdom's dependence on maritime support grew, so did the influence of the Italian republics in local politics, diplomacy, and economic life. While they never ruled the kingdom directly, Venice and Genoa effectively shaped its policies and priorities, making the crusader state increasingly reliant on their power.

The Holy Roman Emperor, Frederick II (reigned 1220–1250), had ambitions in the Crusader state, claiming the kingdom by marriage, but his presence sparked a civil war (1228–1243) among the kingdom's nobility. The kingdom became little more than a pawn in the politics and warfare of the Ayyubid and Mamluk dynasties in Egypt, as well as the Khwarezmian and Mongol invaders. As a relatively minor kingdom, it received little financial or military support from Europe; despite numerous small expeditions, Europeans generally proved unwilling to undertake an expensive journey to the east for an apparently losing cause. The Mamluk sultans Baibars (reigned 1260–1277) and al-Ashraf Khalil (reigned 1290–1293) eventually reconquered all the remaining Crusader strongholds, culminating in the destruction of Acre in 1291.

== People ==
The kingdom was ethnically, religiously, and linguistically diverse, although the Crusaders established themselves and their descendants as an elite Catholic minority. They imported many customs and institutions from their homelands in Europe, and there were close familial and political connections with the West throughout the kingdom's existence. The kingdom also inherited "oriental" qualities, influenced by pre-existing customs and populations. The majority of the kingdom's inhabitants were native Christians, especially Greek and Syriac Orthodox, as well as Sunni and Shi'a Muslims. The native Christians and Muslims, who were a marginalized lower class, tended to speak Greek and Arabic, while the Crusaders, who came mainly from the Kingdom of France, spoke French. There were also a small number of Jews and Samaritans.

According to Benjamin of Tudela, who travelled through the kingdom around 1170, there were 1,000 Samaritans in Nablus, 200 in Caesarea and 300 in Ascalon. This sets a lower bound for the Samaritan population at 1,500, since the contemporary Samaritan chronicle Tolidah mentions communities in Gaza and Acre as well. Benjamin of Tudela estimates the total Jewish population of 14 cities in the kingdom to be 1,200, making the Samaritan population of the time larger than the Jewish, perhaps for the only time in history.

== History ==
=== First Crusade and the foundation of the kingdom ===
The First Crusade was preached at the Council of Clermont in 1095 by Pope Urban II, with the goal of assisting the Byzantine Empire against the invasions of the "Turks and Arabs" and "to destroy this vile race from the lands of our friends." However, the main objective quickly became the control of the Holy Land. The Byzantines were frequently at war with the Seljuks and other Turkish dynasties for control of Anatolia and Syria. The Sunni Seljuks had formerly ruled the Seljuk Empire, but this empire had collapsed into several smaller states after the death of Malik-Shah I in 1092. Malik-Shah was succeeded in the Anatolian Sultanate of Rum by Kilij Arslan I, and in Syria by his brother Tutush I, who died in 1095. Tutush's sons Fakhr al-Mulk Radwan and Duqaq inherited Aleppo and Damascus respectively, further dividing Syria amongst emirs antagonistic towards each other, as well as Kerbogha, the atabeg of Mosul. This disunity among the Anatolian and Syrian emirs allowed the Crusaders to overcome any military opposition they faced on the way to Jerusalem.

Egypt and much of Palestine were controlled by the Fatimid Caliphate, which had extended further into Syria before the arrival of the Seljuks. Warfare between the Fatimids and Seljuks caused great disruption for the local Christians and for Western pilgrims. The Fatimids, under the nominal rule of caliph al-Musta'li but actually controlled by vizier al-Afdal Shahanshah, had lost Jerusalem to the Seljuks in 1073; they recaptured it in 1098 from the Artuqids, a smaller Turkish tribe associated with the Seljuks, just before the arrival of the Crusaders.

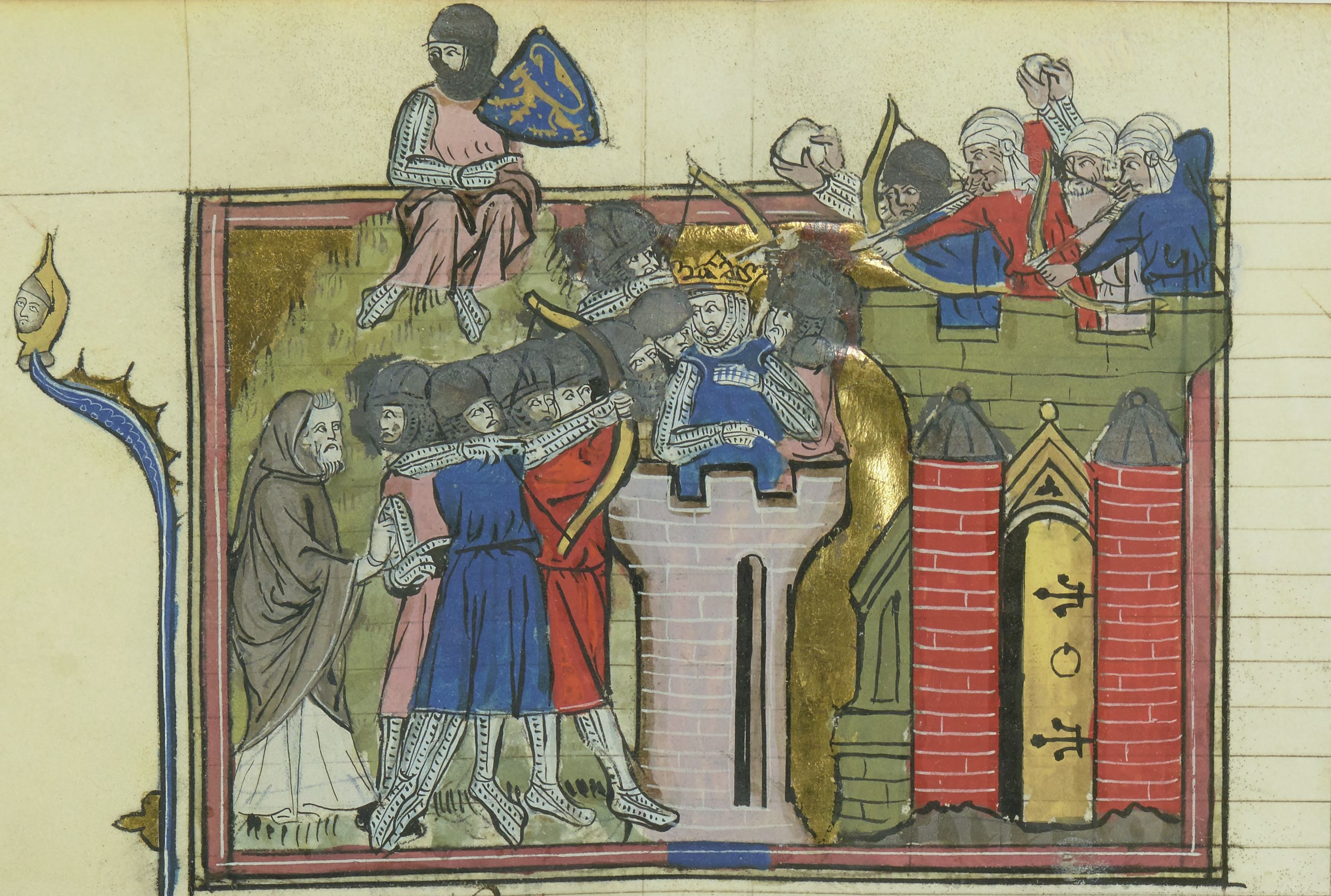
After the successful siege of Jerusalem in 1099, Godfrey of Bouillon, leader of the First Crusade, became the first ruler of the Kingdom of Jerusalem.

The Crusaders arrived at Jerusalem in June 1099; a few of the neighbouring towns (Ramla, Lydda, Bethlehem, and others) were taken first, and Jerusalem was captured on 15 July. On 22 July a council was held in the Church of the Holy Sepulchre to establish a king for the newly created Kingdom of Jerusalem. Raymond IV, Count of Toulouse and Godfrey of Bouillon were recognized as the leaders of the crusade and the siege of Jerusalem. Raymond was the wealthier and more powerful of the two, but at first he refused to become king, perhaps attempting to show his piety and probably hoping that the other nobles would insist upon his election anyway.

The more popular Godfrey did not hesitate like Raymond, and he accepted the position as leader. Most modern historians chronicle that he took the title Advocatus Sancti Sepulchri ("advocate" or "defender" of the Holy Sepulchre). Others report that Godfrey seems to have used the more ambiguous term princeps, or simply retained his title of dux from Lower Lorraine. According to William of Tyre, writing in the mid-12th century when Godfrey had become a legendary hero, he refused to wear "a crown of gold" where Christ had worn "a crown of thorns". Raymond was incensed and took his army to forage away from the city. The new kingdom, and Godfrey's reputation, was secured with the defeat of the Egyptian army under al-Afdal Shahanshah at the Battle of Ascalon on 12 August, but Raymond and Godfrey's continued antagonism prevented the Crusaders from taking control of Ascalon.

There was still some uncertainty about what to do with the new kingdom. The papal legate Daimbert of Pisa convinced Godfrey to hand over Jerusalem to him as Latin patriarch, with the intention to set up a theocratic state directly under papal control. According to William of Tyre, Godfrey may have supported Daimbert's efforts, and he agreed to take possession of "one or two other cities and thus enlarge the kingdom" if Daimbert were permitted to rule Jerusalem. Godfrey did indeed increase the boundaries of the kingdom by capturing Jaffa, Haifa, Tiberias, and other cities, and reducing many others to tributary status. He set the foundations for the system of vassalage in the kingdom, establishing the Principality of Galilee and the County of Jaffa, but his reign was short, and he died of an illness in 1100. His brother Baldwin of Boulogne successfully outmanoeuvred Daimbert and claimed Jerusalem for himself as "King of the Latins of Jerusalem". Daimbert compromised by crowning Baldwin in Bethlehem rather than Jerusalem, but the path for a monarchy in Jerusalem had been laid. Within this framework, a Catholic hierarchy was established, overtop of the local Eastern Orthodox and Syriac Orthodox authorities, who retained their own hierarchies (the Catholics considered them schismatics and thus illegitimate, and vice versa). Under the Latin patriarch, there were four suffragan archdioceses and numerous dioceses.

=== Expansion ===
During Baldwin's reign, the kingdom expanded further. The number of European inhabitants increased, as the minor Crusade of 1101 brought reinforcements to the kingdom. Baldwin repopulated Jerusalem with Franks and native Christians, after his expedition across the Jordan in 1115. With help from the Italian city-states and other adventurers, notably King Sigurd I of Norway, Baldwin captured the port cities of Acre (1104), Beirut (1110), and Sidon (1111), while exerting his suzerainty over the other Crusader states to the north – Edessa (which he had founded in 1097 during the crusade), Antioch, and Tripoli, which he helped capture in 1109. He successfully defended against Muslim invasions, from the Fatimids at the numerous battles at Ramla and elsewhere in the southwest of the kingdom, and from Damascus and Mosul at the Battle of al-Sannabra in the northeast in 1113. As historian Thomas Madden says, Baldwin was "the true founder of the kingdom of Jerusalem", who "had transformed a tenuous arrangement into a solid feudal state. With brilliance and diligence, he established a strong monarchy, conquered the Palestinian coast, reconciled the crusader barons, and built strong frontiers against the kingdom's Muslim neighbours."

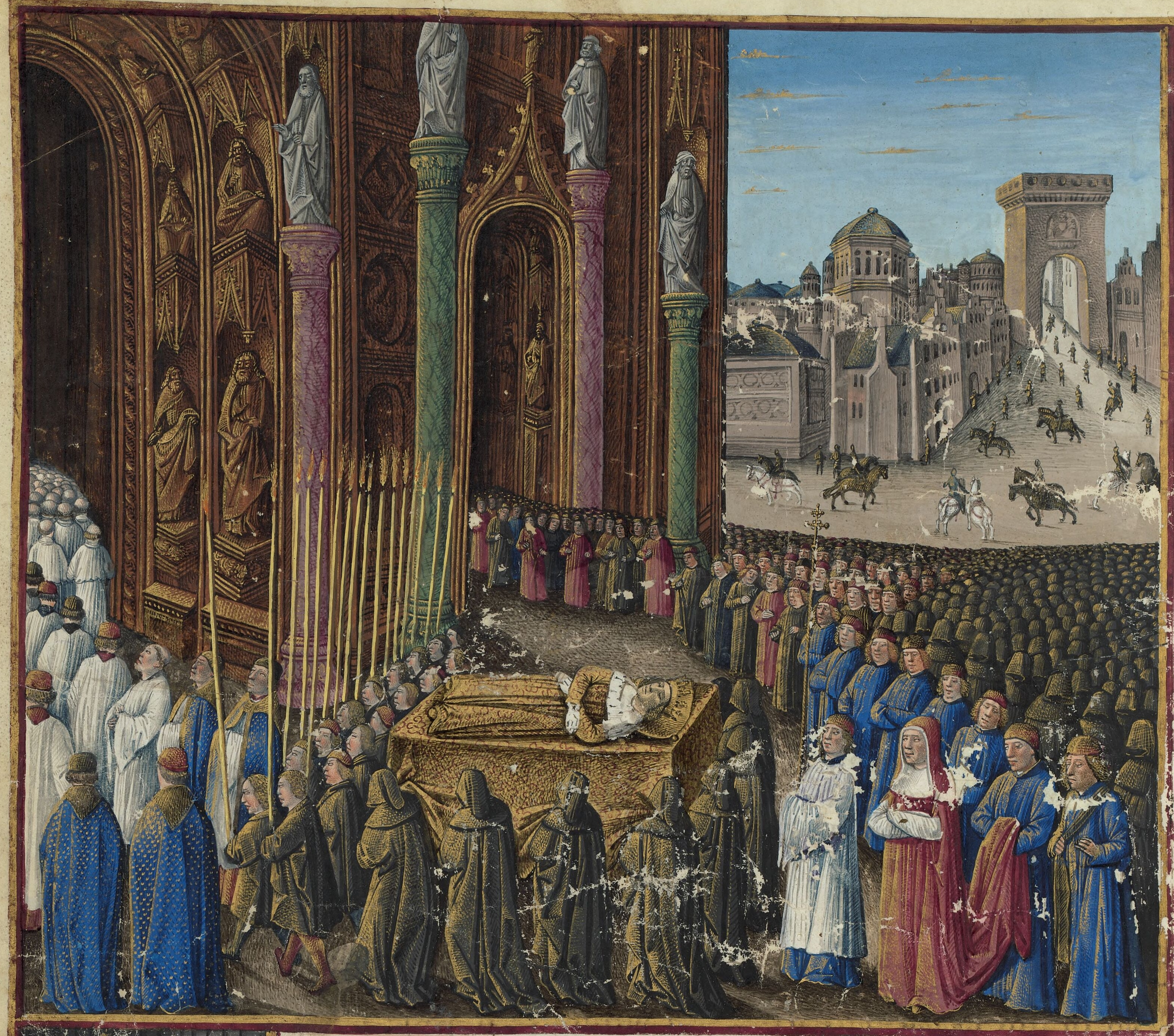
The funeral of Baldwin I from the book Les Passages d'outremer faits par les Français contre les Turcs depuis Charlemagne jusqu'en 1462.

Baldwin brought with him an Armenian wife, traditionally named Arda (although never named such by contemporaries), whom he had married to gain political support from the Armenian population in Edessa, and whom he quickly set aside when he no longer needed Armenian support in Jerusalem. He bigamously married Adelaide del Vasto, regent of Sicily, in 1113, but was convinced to divorce her as well in 1117; Adelaide's son from her first marriage, Roger II of Sicily, never forgave Jerusalem and for decades withheld much-needed Sicilian naval support.

Baldwin died without heirs in 1118 during a campaign against Egypt, and the kingdom was offered to his brother Eustace III of Boulogne, who had accompanied Baldwin and Godfrey on the crusade. Eustace was uninterested, and instead the crown passed to Baldwin's relative, probably a cousin, Baldwin of Le Bourg, who had previously succeeded him in Edessa. Baldwin II was an able ruler, and he too successfully defended against Fatimid and Seljuk invasions. Although Antioch was severely weakened after the Battle of Ager Sanguinis in 1119, and Baldwin was held captive by the emir of Aleppo from 1123 to 1124, Baldwin led the Crusader states to victory at the Battle of Azaz in 1125. His reign saw the establishment of the first military orders, the Knights Hospitaller and the Knights Templar; the earliest surviving written laws of the kingdom, compiled at the Council of Nablus in 1120; and the first commercial treaty with the Republic of Venice, the Pactum Warmundi, in 1124. The increase of naval and military support from Venice led to the capture of Tyre that year. The influence of Jerusalem was further extended over Edessa and Antioch, where Baldwin acted as regent when their own leaders were killed in battle, although there were regency governments in Jerusalem as well during Baldwin's captivity.

Baldwin was married to the Armenian noblewoman Morphia of Melitene and had four daughters: Hodierna and Alice, who married into the families of the Count of Tripoli and Prince of Antioch; Ioveta, who became an influential abbess; and the eldest, Melisende, who was his heir and succeeded him upon his death in 1131, with her husband Fulk V of Anjou as king-consort. Their son, the future Baldwin III, was named co-heir by his grandfather.

=== Edessa, Damascus, and the Second Crusade ===
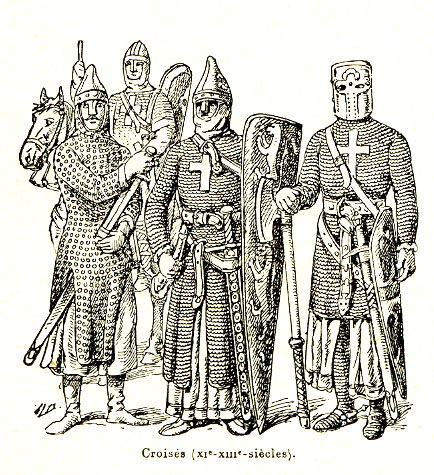
Depiction of Crusaders from a 1922 edition of Petit Larousse

Fulk was an experienced Crusader and had brought military support to the kingdom during a pilgrimage in 1120. He brought Jerusalem into the sphere of the Angevin Empire, as the father of Geoffrey V of Anjou and grandfather of the future Henry II of England. Not everyone appreciated the imposition of a foreigner as king. In 1132 Antioch, Tripoli, and Edessa all asserted their independence and conspired to prevent Fulk from exercising the suzerainty of Jerusalem over them. He defeated Tripoli in battle and settled the regency in Antioch by arranging a marriage between the countess, Melisende's niece Constance, and his own relative Raymond of Poitiers.

Meanwhile, in Jerusalem, the native Crusader nobles opposed Fulk's preference for his Angevin retinue. In 1134 Hugh II of Jaffa revolted against Fulk, allying with the Muslim garrison at Ascalon, for which he was convicted of treason in absentia. The Latin patriarch William of Malines intervened to settle the dispute, but an assassination attempt was made on Hugh, for which Fulk was blamed. This scandal allowed Melisende and her supporters to gain control of the government, just as her father had intended. Accordingly, Fulk "became so uxorious that...not even in unimportant cases did he take any measures without her knowledge and assistance."

Fulk was faced with a new and more dangerous enemy: the atabeg Zengi of Mosul, who had taken control of Aleppo and had set his sights on Damascus as well; the union of these three states would have been a serious blow to the growing power of Jerusalem. A brief intervention in 1137–1138 by Byzantine Emperor John II Comnenus, who wished to assert imperial suzerainty over all the Crusader states, did nothing to stop the threat of Zengi; in 1139 Damascus and Jerusalem recognized the severity of the threat to both states, and an alliance was concluded which halted Zengi's advance. Fulk used this time to construct numerous castles, including Ibelin and Kerak. After the death of both Fulk and Emperor John in separate hunting accidents in 1143, Zengi invaded and conquered Edessa in 1144. Queen Melisende, now regent for her elder son Baldwin III, appointed Manasses of Hierges as constable to head the army after Fulk's death, but Edessa could not be recaptured. The fall of Edessa shocked Europe, and lead to the Second Crusade in 1147.

After meeting in Acre in June, the crusading kings Louis VII of France and Conrad III of Germany agreed with Melisende, Baldwin and the major nobles of the kingdom to attack Damascus. Zengi's territory had been divided amongst his sons after his death in 1145, and Damascus no longer felt threatened, so an alliance had been made with Zengi's son Nur ad-Din, the emir of Aleppo. Perhaps remembering attacks launched on Jerusalem from Damascus in previous decades, Damascus seemed to be the best target for the crusade, rather than Aleppo or another city to the north which would have allowed for the recapture of Edessa. The subsequent Siege of Damascus was a complete failure; when the city seemed to be on the verge of collapse, the Crusader army suddenly moved against another section of the walls, and was driven back. The Crusaders retreated within three days. There were rumours of treachery and bribery, and Conrad felt betrayed by the nobility of Jerusalem. Whatever the reason for the failure, the French and German armies returned home, and a few years later Damascus was firmly under Nur ad-Din's control.

=== Civil war ===
The failure of the Second Crusade had dire long-term consequences for the kingdom. The West was hesitant to send large-scale expeditions; for the next few decades, only small armies came, headed by minor European nobles who desired to make pilgrimage. The Muslim states of Syria were meanwhile gradually united by Nur ad-Din, who defeated the Principality of Antioch at the Battle of Inab in 1149 and gained control of Damascus in 1154. Nur ad-Din was pious, and during his rule the concept of jihad came to be interpreted as a kind of counter-crusade against the kingdom, which was an impediment to Muslim unity, both political and spiritual.

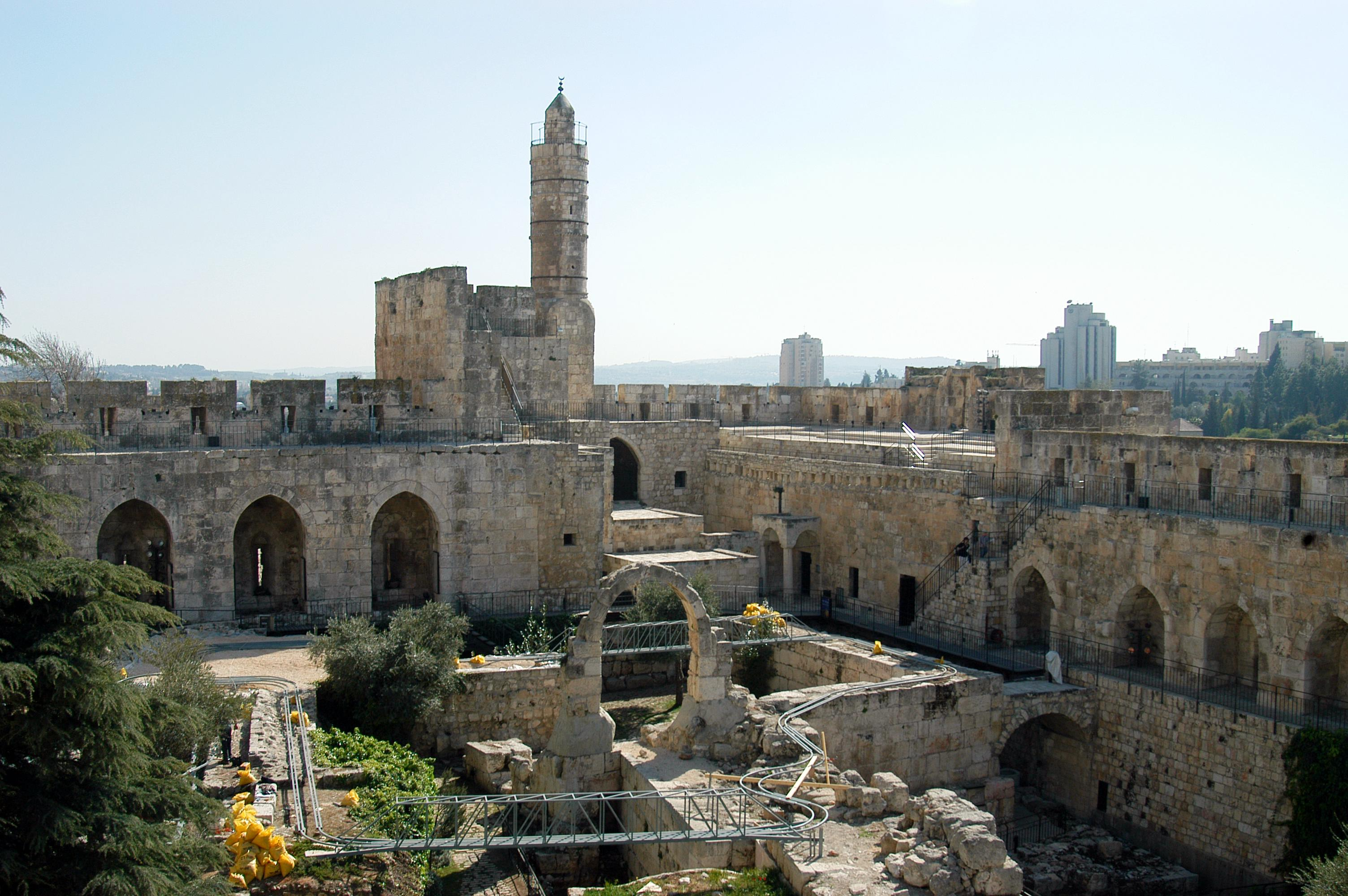
The Tower of David in Jerusalem as it appears today

In Jerusalem, the Crusaders were distracted by a conflict between Melisende and Baldwin. Melisende continued to rule as regent long after Baldwin came of age. She was supported by Manasses of Hierges, who essentially governed for her as constable; her son Amalric, whom she set up as count of Jaffa; Philip of Milly; and the Ibelin family. Baldwin asserted his independence by mediating disputes in Antioch and Tripoli, and he gained the support of the Ibelin brothers when they began to oppose Manasses' growing power, thanks to his marriage to their widowed mother Helvis of Ramla. In 1153 Baldwin had himself crowned as sole ruler, and a compromise was reached by which the kingdom was divided in two, with Baldwin taking Acre and Tyre in the north and Melisende remaining in control of Jerusalem and the cities of the south. Baldwin was able to replace Manasses with one of his own supporters, Humphrey II of Toron. Baldwin and Melisende knew that this situation was untenable. Baldwin invaded his mother's possessions, defeated Manasses, and besieged his mother in the Tower of David in Jerusalem. Melisende surrendered and retired to Nablus, but Baldwin appointed her his regent and chief advisor, and she retained some of her influence, especially in appointing ecclesiastical officials. In 1153 Baldwin launched an offensive against Ascalon, the fortress in the south from which Fatimid Egyptian armies had continually raided Jerusalem since the foundation of the kingdom. The fortress was captured and was added to the County of Jaffa.

=== Byzantine alliance and invasion of Egypt ===
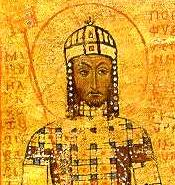
Byzantine Emperor Manuel I Comnenus, who became a close ally of the Kingdom of Jerusalem.

With the capture of Ascalon the southern border of the kingdom was secure, and Egypt—formerly a major threat to the kingdom but destabilized under the reign of several underaged caliphs—was reduced to a tributary state. Nur ad-Din remained a threat in the east, and Baldwin had to contend with the advances of Byzantine Emperor Manuel I Comnenus, who claimed suzerainty over the Principality of Antioch. In order to bolster the defences of the kingdom against the growing strength of the Muslims, Baldwin made the first direct alliance with the Byzantine Empire by marrying Theodora Comnena, a niece of Manuel; Manuel married Baldwin's cousin Maria. As William of Tyre put it, it was hoped that Manuel would be able "to relieve from his own abundance the distress under which our realm was suffering and to change our poverty into superabundance". The relationship between Byzantium and Jerusalem has divided historians, with some historians supporting the Byzantine interpretation that Amalric recognised Manuel as his overlord, while other scholars such as Andrew Jotischky see the relationship as one of Byzantine protection of Orthodox Christians in Jerusalem.

When Baldwin died childless in 1162, a year after his mother Melisende, the kingdom passed to Amalric, who renewed the alliance negotiated by Baldwin. In 1163 the chaotic situation in Egypt led to a refusal to pay tribute to Jerusalem, and Egyptian vizier Shawar sent request Nur ad-Din for assistance. In response, Amalric invaded Egypt but was turned back when the Egyptians flooded the Nile at Bilbeis. Shawar again requested help from Nur ad-Din, who sent his general Shirkuh, but Shawar quickly turned against him and allied with Amalric. Amalric and Shirkuh both besieged Bilbeis in 1164, but both withdrew due to Nur ad-Din's campaigns against Antioch, where Bohemond III of Antioch and Raymond III of Tripoli were defeated at the Battle of Harim. It seemed likely that Antioch would fall to Nur ad-Din, but he withdrew when Emperor Manuel sent a large Byzantine force to the area. Nur ad-Din sent Shirkuh back to Egypt in 1166, and Shawar again allied with Amalric, who was defeated at the Battle of al-Babein. Despite the defeat, both sides withdrew, but Shawar remained in control with a Crusader garrison in Cairo.

Amalric cemented his alliance with Manuel by marrying Manuel's niece Maria Komnene in 1167, and an embassy led by William of Tyre was sent to Constantinople to negotiate a military expedition, but in 1168 Amalric pillaged Bilbeis without waiting for the naval support promised by Manuel. Amalric accomplished nothing else, but his actions prompted Shawar to switch sides again and seek help from Shirkuh. Shawar was promptly executed by Shirkuh, and when Shirkuh died in 1169, he was succeeded by his nephew Yusuf, better known as Saladin. That year, Manuel sent a large Byzantine fleet of some 300 ships to assist Amalric, and the town of Damietta was placed under siege. However, the Byzantine fleet sailed with enough provisions for only three months. By the time the Crusaders were ready, supplies were already running out, and the fleet retired. Each side sought to blame the other for the failure, but both knew that they could not take Egypt without the other's assistance: the alliance was maintained, and plans for another campaign in Egypt were made, which ultimately were to come to nought.

In the end, Nur ad-Din was victorious and Saladin established himself as Sultan of Egypt. Saladin began to assert his independence from Nur ad-Din, and with the death of both Amalric and Nur ad-Din in 1174, he was well-placed to exert control over Nur ad-Din's Syrian possessions as well.

=== Baldwin IV and Saladin ===
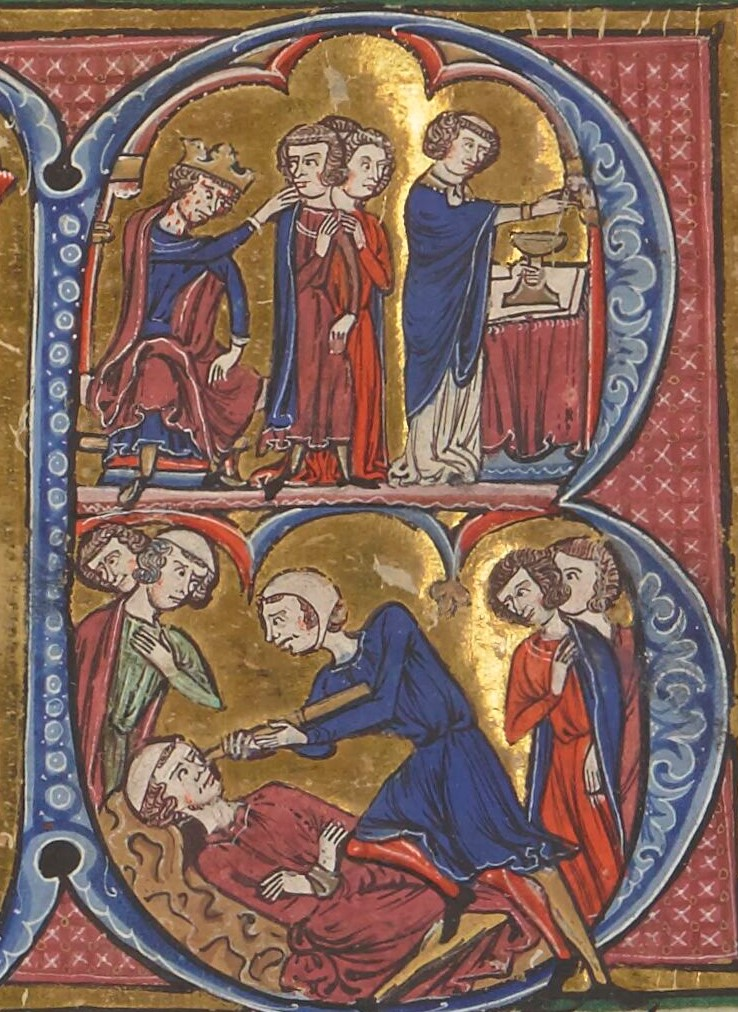
Marriage of Sibylla to Guy of Lusignan in presence of her brother, the leprosy-afflicted King Baldwin IV in the top panel, with the bottom panel showing protosebastios Alexios being blinded

The subsequent events have often been interpreted as a struggle between two opposing factions, the "court party", made up of the minor king Baldwin IV's mother, Amalric's first wife Agnes of Courtenay, her immediate family, and recent arrivals from Europe who were inexperienced in the affairs of the kingdom and who were in favour of war with Saladin; and the "noble party", led by Raymond of Tripoli and the lesser nobility of the kingdom, who favoured peaceful co-existence with the Muslims. This is the interpretation offered by William of Tyre, who was firmly placed in the "noble" camp, and his view was taken up by subsequent historians; in the 20th century, Marshall W. Baldwin, Steven Runciman, and Hans E. Mayer favoured this interpretation. Peter W. Edbury, on the other hand, argues that William as well as the 13th-century authors who continued William's chronicle and were allied to Raymond's supporters in the Ibelin family, cannot be considered impartial. Although the events were clearly a dynastic struggle, "the division was not between native barons and newcomers from the West, but between the king's maternal and paternal kin."

Miles of Plancy was briefly bailli or regent during Baldwin IV's minority. Miles was assassinated in October 1174, and Count Raymond III of Tripoli, Amalric's first cousin, became regent. It is highly probable that Raymond or his supporters engineered the assassination. Baldwin reached his majority in 1176, and despite his leprosy he no longer had any legal need for a regent. Since Raymond was his nearest relative in the male line with a strong claim to the throne, there was concern about the extent of his ambitions, although he had no direct heirs of his own. To balance this, the king turned from time to time to his uncle, Joscelin III of Edessa, who was appointed seneschal in 1176; Joscelin was more closely related to Baldwin than Raymond was but had no claim to the throne.

As a leper, Baldwin had no children and could not be expected to rule long, so the focus of his succession passed to his sister Sibylla and his younger half-sister Isabella. Baldwin and his advisors recognised that it was essential for Sibylla to be married to a Western nobleman in order to access support from European states in a military crisis; while Raymond was still regent, a marriage was arranged for Sibylla and William of Montferrat, a cousin of Louis VII of France and of Frederick Barbarossa, Holy Roman Emperor. It was hoped that by allying with a relative of the Western emperor, Frederick would come to the kingdom's aid. Jerusalem looked again towards the Byzantine Empire for help, and Emperor Manuel was looking for a way to restore his empire's prestige after his defeat at the Battle of Myriokephalon in 1176; this mission was undertaken by Raynald of Châtillon. After William of Montferrat arrived in 1176, he fell ill and died in June 1177, leaving Sibylla widowed and pregnant with the future Baldwin V. Raynald was then named regent.

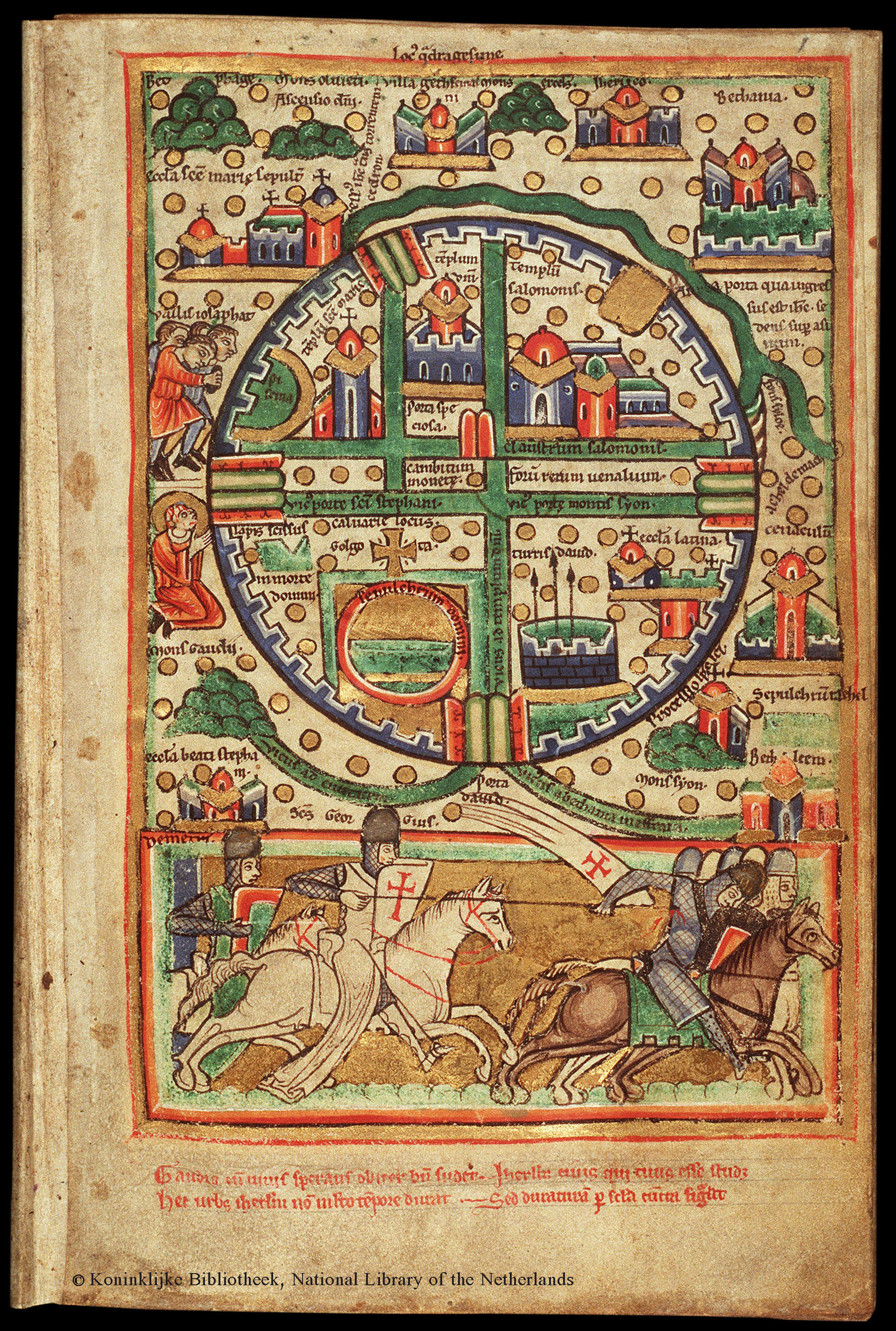
An idealized twelfth-century map of the crusader Kingdom of Jerusalem.

Soon afterwards, Philip of Flanders arrived in Jerusalem on pilgrimage; he was Baldwin IV's cousin, and the king offered him the regency and command of the army, both of which Philip refused, although he objected to the appointment of Raynald as regent. Philip then attempted to intervene in the negotiations for Sibylla's second husband, and suggested one of his own retinue, but the native barons refused his suggestion. In addition, Philip seemed to think he could carve out a territory of his own in Egypt, but he refused to participate in the planned Byzantine-Jerusalem expedition. The expedition was delayed and finally cancelled, and Philip took his army away to the north.

Most of the army of Jerusalem marched north with Philip, Raymond III, and Bohemond III to attack Hama, and Saladin took the opportunity to invade the kingdom. Baldwin proved to be an effective and energetic king as well as a brilliant military commander: he defeated Saladin at the Battle of Montgisard in September 1177 despite being greatly outnumbered and having to rely on a levee-en-masse. Although Baldwin's presence despite his illness was inspirational, direct military decisions were actually made by Raynald.

Hugh III of Burgundy was expected to come to Jerusalem and marry Sibylla, but Hugh was unable to leave France due to the political unrest there in 1179–1180 following the death of Louis VII. Meanwhile, Baldwin IV's stepmother Maria, mother of Isabella and stepmother of Sibylla, married Balian of Ibelin. At Easter in 1180, Raymond and his cousin Bohemond III of Antioch attempted to force Sibylla to marry Balian's brother Baldwin of Ibelin. Raymond and Bohemond were King Baldwin's nearest male relatives in the paternal line, and could have claimed the throne if the king died without an heir or a suitable replacement. Before Raymond and Bohemond arrived, Agnes and King Baldwin arranged for Sibylla to be married to a Poitevin newcomer, Guy of Lusignan, whose older brother Amalric was already an established figure at court. Internationally, the Lusignans were useful as vassals of Baldwin and Sibylla's cousin Henry II of England. Baldwin betrothed eight-year-old Isabella to Humphrey IV of Toron, stepson of the powerful Raynald of Châtillon, thereby removing her from the influence of the Ibelin family and that of her mother.

The dispute between the two factions in the kingdom affected the election of a new Patriarch in 1180. When Patriarch Amalric died on 6 October 1180, the two most obvious choices for his successor were William of Tyre and Heraclius of Caesarea. They were fairly evenly matched in background and education, but politically they were allied with opposite parties, as Heraclius was one of Agnes of Courtenay's supporters. The canons of the Holy Sepulchre asked the king for advice, and Heraclius was chosen through Agnes' influence. There were rumours that Agnes and Heraclius were lovers, but this information comes from the partisan 13th-century continuations of William of Tyre's history, and there is no other evidence to substantiate such a claim.

At the end of 1181, Raynald of Châtillon raided south into Arabia, in the direction of Medina, although he did not make it that far. It was probably around this time that Raynald also attacked a Muslim caravan. The kingdom had a truce with Saladin at the time, and Raynald's actions have been seen as an independent act of brigandage; it is possible that he was trying to prevent Saladin from moving his forces north to take control of Aleppo, which would have strengthened Saladin's position. In response, Saladin attacked the kingdom in 1182, but was defeated at Belvoir Castle. King Baldwin, although quite ill, was still able to command the army in person. Saladin attempted to besiege Beirut from land and sea, and Baldwin raided Damascene territory, but neither side did significant damage. In December 1182, Raynald launched a naval expedition on the Red Sea, which made it as far south as Rabigh. The expedition was defeated and two of Raynald's men were actually taken to Mecca to be executed in public. Like his earlier raids, Raynald's expedition is usually seen as selfish and ultimately fatal for Jerusalem, but according to Bernard Hamilton, it was actually a shrewd strategy, meant to damage Saladin's prestige and reputation.

Upon the death of the pro-western Emperor Manuel in 1180, the Kingdom of Jerusalem had lost its most powerful ally, as his son Alexios II was a minor, with the regency of his mother Maria being opposed by the Greeks due to her foreign origins, her scandalous love affair with the protosebastos Alexios and partisan attitude towards merchants of the Italian maritime republics like Venice, Genoa & Pisa. 3 years later, Alexios was murdered by Andronikos Comnenus, who had instigated a large-scale massacre of Italian merchants living within the Walls of Constantinople, which permanently soured Western European relations with the Byzantine Empire, thus exacerbating the Great Schism.

In 1183 a general tax was levied throughout the kingdom, which was unprecedented in Jerusalem and almost all of medieval Europe to that point. The tax helped pay for larger armies for the next few years. More troops were certainly needed, since Saladin was finally able to gain control of Aleppo, and with peace in his northern territories, he could focus on Jerusalem in the south. King Baldwin was so incapacitated by his leprosy that it was necessary to appoint a regent, and Guy of Lusignan was chosen, as he was Baldwin's legal heir and the king was not expected to live. The inexperienced Guy led the Frankish army against Saladin's incursions into the kingdom, but neither side made any real gains, and Guy was criticized by his opponents for not striking against Saladin when he had the chance.

In October 1183, Isabella married Humphrey of Toron at Kerak during a siege by Saladin, who perhaps hoped to take some valuable prisoners. As King Baldwin, although now blind and crippled, had recovered enough to resume his reign and his command of the army, Guy was removed from the regency and his five-year-old stepson, King Baldwin's nephew and namesake Baldwin, was crowned as co-king in November. King Baldwin himself then went to relieve the castle, carried on a litter, and attended by his mother. He was reconciled with Raymond of Tripoli and appointed him military commander. The siege was lifted in December and Saladin retreated to Damascus. Saladin attempted another siege in 1184, but Baldwin repelled that attack as well, and Saladin raided Nablus and other towns on the way home.

In October 1184, Guy of Lusignan led an attack on the Bedouin nomads from his base in Ascalon. Unlike Raynald's attacks on caravans, which may have had some military purpose, Guy attacked a group that was usually loyal to Jerusalem and provided intelligence about the movements of Saladin's troops. At the same time, King Baldwin contracted his final illness and Raymond of Tripoli, rather than Guy, was appointed as his regent. His nephew Baldwin was paraded in public, wearing his crown as Baldwin V. Baldwin IV finally succumbed to his leprosy in May 1185.

Meanwhile, the succession crisis had prompted a mission to the West to seek assistance. In 1184, Patriarch Heraclius travelled throughout the courts of Europe, but no help was forthcoming. Heraclius offered the "keys of the Holy Sepulchre, those of the Tower of David and the banner of the Kingdom of Jerusalem", but not the crown itself, to both Philip II of France and Henry II of England; the latter, as a grandson of Fulk, was a first cousin of the royal family of Jerusalem, and had promised to go on crusade after the murder of Thomas Becket. Both kings preferred to remain at home to defend their own territories, rather than act as regent for a child in Jerusalem. The few European knights who did travel to Jerusalem did not even see any combat, since the truce with Saladin had been re-established. William V of Montferrat was one of the few who came to his grandson Baldwin V's aid.

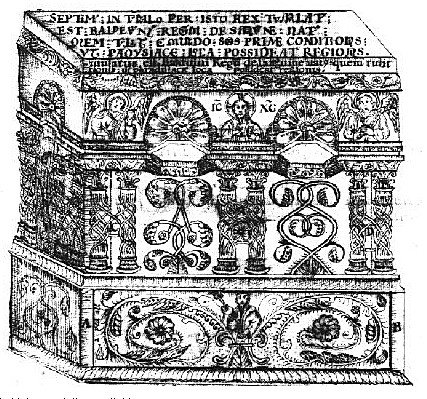
The tomb of Baldwin V on an 18th-century drawing by Elzear Horn

Baldwin V's rule, with Raymond of Tripoli as regent and his great-uncle Joscelin of Edessa as his guardian, was short. He was a sickly child and died in the summer of 1186. Raymond and his supporters went to Nablus, presumably in an attempt to prevent Sibylla from claiming the throne, but Sibylla and her supporters went to Jerusalem, where it was decided that the kingdom should pass to her, on the condition that her marriage to Guy be annulled. She agreed but only if she could choose her own husband and king, and after being crowned, she immediately crowned Guy with her own hands. Raymond had refused to attend the coronation, and in Nablus he suggested that Isabella and Humphrey should be crowned instead, but Humphrey refused to agree to this plan which would have certainly started a civil war. Humphrey went to Jerusalem and swore allegiance to Guy and Sibylla, as did most of Raymond's other supporters. Raymond himself refused to do so and left for Tripoli; Baldwin of Ibelin also refused, gave up his fiefs, and left for Antioch.

=== Loss of Jerusalem and the Third Crusade ===
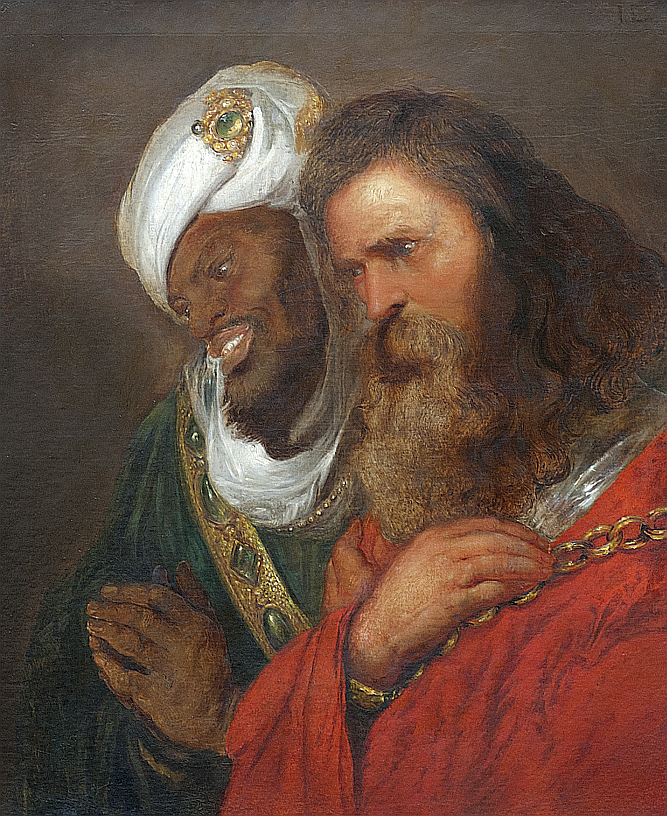
17th-century interpretation of Guy of Lusignan (right) being held captive by Saladin (left), clad in a traditional (Islamic) royal garment, painted by Jan Lievens.

The Near East, c. 1190, at the outset of the Third Crusade

Raymond of Tripoli allied with Saladin against Guy and allowed a Muslim garrison to occupy his fief in Tiberias, probably hoping that Saladin would help him overthrow Guy. Saladin, meanwhile, had pacified his Mesopotamian territories, and was now eager to attack the crusader kingdom; he did not intend to renew the truce when it expired in 1187. Before the truce expired, Raynald of Chatillon, the lord of Oultrejourdain and of Kerak and one of Guy's chief supporters, recognized that Saladin was massing his troops, and attacked Muslim caravans in an attempt to disrupt this. Guy was on the verge of attacking Raymond, but realized that the kingdom would need to be united in the face of the threat from Saladin, and Balian of Ibelin effected a reconciliation between the two during Easter in 1187. Saladin attacked Kerak again in April, and in May, a Muslim raiding party ran into the much smaller embassy on its way to negotiate with Raymond, and defeated it at the Battle of Cresson near Nazareth. Raymond and Guy finally agreed to attack Saladin at Tiberias, but could not agree on a plan; Raymond thought a pitched battle should be avoided, but Guy probably remembered the criticism he faced for avoiding battle in 1183, and it was decided to march out against Saladin directly. On 4 July 1187, the army of the kingdom was utterly destroyed at the Battle of Hattin. Raymond of Tripoli, Balian of Ibelin, and Reginald of Sidon escaped, but Raynald was executed by Saladin and Guy was imprisoned in Damascus.

Over the next few months, Saladin easily overran the entire kingdom. Only the port of Tyre remained in Frankish hands, defended by Conrad of Montferrat, who had coincidentally arrived just in time from Constantinople. The fall of Jerusalem essentially ended the first Kingdom of Jerusalem. Much of the population, swollen with refugees fleeing Saladin's conquest of the surrounding territory, was allowed to flee to Tyre, Tripoli, or Egypt (whence they were sent back to Europe), but those who could not pay for their freedom were sold into slavery, and those who could were often robbed by Christians and Muslims alike on their way into exile. The capture of the city led to the Third Crusade, launched in 1189 and led by Richard the Lionheart, Philip Augustus and Frederick Barbarossa, though the last drowned en route.

Guy of Lusignan, who had been refused entry to Tyre by Conrad, began to besiege Acre in 1189. During the lengthy siege, which lasted until 1191, Patriarch Heraclius, Queen Sibylla and her daughters, and many others died of disease. With the death of Sibylla in 1190, Guy now had no legal claim to the kingship, and the succession passed to Sibylla's half-sister Isabella. Isabella's mother Maria and the Ibelins (now closely allied to Conrad) argued that Isabella and Humphrey's marriage was illegal, as she had been underage at the time; underlying this was the fact that Humphrey had betrayed his wife's cause in 1186. The marriage was annulled amid some controversy. Conrad, who was now the nearest kinsman to Baldwin V in the male line, and had already proved himself a capable military leader, then married Isabella, but Guy refused to concede the crown.

When Richard arrived in 1191, he and Philip took different sides in the succession dispute. Richard backed Guy, his vassal from Poitou, while Philip supported Conrad, a cousin of his late father Louis VII. After much ill feeling and ill health, Philip returned home in 1191, soon after the fall of Acre. Richard defeated Saladin at the Battle of Arsuf in 1191 and the Battle of Jaffa in 1192, recovering most of the coast, but could not recover Jerusalem or any of the inland territory of the kingdom. It has been suggested that this may have actually been a strategic decision by Richard rather than a failure as such, as he may have recognized that Jerusalem, in particular, was in fact a strategic liability as long as the Crusaders were obligated to defend it, as it was isolated from the sea where Western reinforcements could arrive. Conrad was unanimously elected king in April 1192, but was murdered by the Hashshashin only days later. Eight days after that, the pregnant Isabella was married to Count Henry II of Champagne, nephew of Richard and Philip, but politically allied to Richard. As compensation, Richard sold Guy the island of Cyprus, which Richard had captured on the way to Acre, although Guy continued to claim the throne of Jerusalem until his death in 1194.

The crusade came to an end peacefully, with the Treaty of Ramla negotiated in 1192; Saladin allowed pilgrimages to be made to Jerusalem, allowing the crusaders to fulfil their vows, after which they all returned home. The native crusader barons set about rebuilding their kingdom from Acre and the other coastal cities.

=== Kingdom of Acre ===
For the next hundred years, the Kingdom of Jerusalem remained a tiny kingdom hugging the Syrian coastline. Its capital was moved to Acre and controlled most of the coastline of present-day Israel and southern and central Lebanon, including the strongholds and towns of Jaffa, Arsuf, Caesarea, Tyre, Sidon, and Beirut. At best, it included only a few other significant cities, such as Ascalon and some interior fortresses, as well as suzerainty over Tripoli and Antioch. The new king, Henry of Champagne, died accidentally in 1197, and Isabella married for a fourth time, to Aimery of Lusignan, Guy's brother. Aimery had already inherited Cyprus from Guy, and had been crowned king by Frederick Barbarossa's son, Emperor Henry VI. Henry led a crusade in 1197 but died along the way. Nevertheless, his troops recaptured Beirut and Sidon for the kingdom before returning home in 1198. A five-year truce was then concluded with the Ayyubids in Syria in 1198.

The Ayyubid empire had fallen into civil war after the death of Saladin in 1193. His sons claimed various parts of his empire: az-Zahir took control of Aleppo, al-Aziz Uthman held Cairo, while his eldest son, al-Afdal, retained Damascus. Saladin's brother Al-Adil Sayf ad-Din (often called "Saphadin" by the Crusaders) acquired al-Jazira (northern Mesopotamia), and al-Adil's son al-Mu'azzam took possession of Karak and Transjordan. In 1196, al-Afdal was driven out of Damascus by al Adil in alliance with Uthman. When Uthman died in 1198, al Afdal returned to power as regent in Egypt for Uthman's infant son. Allied with az-Zahir, he then attacked his uncle in Damascus. The alliance fell apart, and al-Adil then defeated al Afdal in Egypt and annexed the country. In 1200 Al-Adil proclaimed himself Sultan of Egypt and Syria, entrusting Damascus to al-Mu'azzam and al-Jazira to another son, al-Kamil. Following a second unsuccessful siege of Damascus by the two brothers, Al Afdal accepted a fief consisting of Samosata and a number of other towns. Az-Zahir of Aleppo submitted to his uncle in 1202, thus re-uniting the Ayyubid territories.

Meanwhile, schemes were hatched to reconquer Jerusalem through Egypt. A Fourth Crusade was planned after the failure of the Third, but it resulted in the sack of Constantinople in 1204, and most of the crusaders involved never arrived in the kingdom. Aimery, however, not knowing of the diversion to Constantinople, raided Egypt in advance of the expected invasion. Both Isabella and Aimery died in 1205 and again an underage girl, Isabella and Conrad's daughter Maria of Montferrat, became queen of Jerusalem. Isabella's half-brother John of Ibelin, the Old Lord of Beirut governed as regent until 1210 when Maria married an experienced French knight, John of Brienne. Maria died in childbirth in 1212, and John of Brienne continued to rule as regent for their daughter Isabella II.

=== Fifth and Sixth Crusades and Frederick II ===
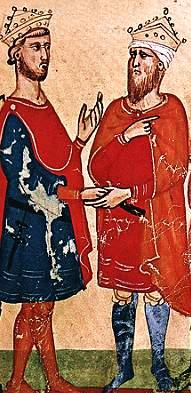
Frederick II (left) meets al-Kamil (right). Nuova Cronica by Giovanni Villani (14th century).

The Fourth Lateran Council in 1215 called for a new, better-organized crusade against Egypt. In late 1217 King Andrew II of Hungary and Duke Leopold VI of Austria arrived in Acre and, along with John of Brienne, raided territory further inland, including Mount Tabor, but without success. After the departure of the Hungarians, the remaining Crusaders set about refortifying Caesarea and the Templar fortress of Château Pèlerin throughout the winter of 1217 and spring of 1218.

In the spring of 1218 the Fifth Crusade began in earnest when German crusader fleets landed at Acre. Along with King John, who was elected leader of the crusade, the fleets sailed to Egypt and besieged Damietta at the mouth of the Nile in May. The siege progressed slowly, and the Egyptian sultan al-Adil died in August 1218, supposedly of shock after the Crusaders managed to capture one of Damietta's towers. He was succeeded by his son al-Kamil. In the autumn of 1218 reinforcements arrived from Europe, including the papal legate Pelagius of Albano. In the winter the crusaders were affected by floods and disease, and the siege dragged on throughout 1219, when Francis of Assisi arrived to attempt to negotiate a truce. Neither side could agree to terms, despite the Ayyubid offer of a thirty-year truce and the restoration of Jerusalem and most of the rest of the former kingdom. The Crusaders finally managed to starve out the city and captured it in November. Al-Kamil retreated to the nearby fortress of al-Mansurah, but the crusaders remained in Damietta throughout 1219 and 1220, awaiting the arrival of Holy Roman Emperor Frederick II, while King John returned to Acre briefly to defend against al-Mu'azzam, who was raiding the kingdom from Damascus in John's absence. Still expecting the emperor's imminent arrival, in July 1221, the Crusaders set off towards Cairo, but they were stopped by the rising Nile, which al-Kamil allowed to flood by breaking the dams along its course. The sultan easily defeated the trapped Crusader army and regained Damietta. Emperor Frederick had, in fact, never left Europe at all.

After the failure of the crusade, John travelled throughout Europe seeking assistance, but found support only from Frederick, who then married John and Maria's daughter Isabella II in 1225. The next year, Isabella died giving birth to their son Conrad IV, who succeeded his mother to the throne although he never appeared in the East. Frederick had reneged on his promise to lead the Fifth Crusade, but was now eager to cement his claim to the throne through Conrad. There were also plans to join with al-Kamil in attacking al-Mu'azzam in Damascus, an alliance which had been discussed with Egyptian envoys in Italy. But after continually delaying his departure for the Holy Land, including suffering an outbreak of disease in his fleet, he was excommunicated by Pope Gregory IX in 1227. The crusaders, led not by Frederick but by his representatives Richard Filangieri, Henry IV, Duke of Limburg, and Hermann of Salza, Grand Master of the Teutonic Knights, arrived in the east late in 1227, and while waiting for the emperor they set about refortifying Sidon, where they built the sea castle, and Montfort, which later became the headquarters of the Teutonic Knights. The Ayyubids of Damascus did not dare attack, as al-Mu'azzam had suddenly died not long before. Frederick finally arrived on the Sixth Crusade in September 1228, and claimed the regency of the kingdom in the name of his infant son.

Frederick immediately came into conflict with the native nobles of Outremer, some of whom resented his attempts to impose Imperial authority over both Cyprus and Jerusalem. The Cypriot nobles were already quarrelling amongst themselves about the regency for Henry I of Cyprus, who was still a child. The High Court of Cyprus had elected John of Ibelin as regent, but Henry's mother Alice of Champagne wished to appoint one of her supporters; Alice and her party, members or supporters of the Lusignan dynasty, sided with Frederick, whose father had crowned Aimery of Lusignan king in 1197. At Limassol, Frederick demanded that John give up not only the regency of Cyprus, but also John's own lordship of Beirut on the mainland. John argued that Frederick had no legal authority to make such demands and refused to give up either title. Frederick then imprisoned John's sons as hostages to guarantee John's support for his crusade.

John did accompany Frederick to the mainland, but Frederick was not well-received there; one of his few supporters was Balian, Lord of Sidon, who had welcomed the crusaders the year before and now acted as an ambassador to the Ayyubids. The death of al-Mu'azzam negated the proposed alliance with al-Kamil, who along with his brother al-Ashraf had taken possession of Damascus (as well as Jerusalem) from their nephew, al-Mu'azzam's son an-Nasir Dawud. However, al-Kamil presumably did not know of the small size of Frederick's army, nor the divisions within it caused by his excommunication, and wished to avoid defending his territories against another crusade. Frederick's presence alone was sufficient to regain Jerusalem, Bethlehem, Nazareth, and a number of surrounding castles without a fight: these were recovered in February 1229, in return for a ten-year truce with the Ayyubids and freedom of worship for Jerusalem's Muslim inhabitants. The terms of the treaty were unacceptable to the Patriarch of Jerusalem Gerald of Lausanne, who placed the city under interdict. In March, Frederick crowned himself in the Church of the Holy Sepulchre, but because of his excommunication and the interdict Jerusalem was never truly reincorporated into the kingdom, which continued to be ruled from Acre.

Meanwhile, in Italy, the Pope used Frederick's excommunication as an excuse to invade his Italian territories; the papal armies were led by Frederick's former father-in-law John of Brienne. Frederick was forced to return home in 1229, leaving the Holy Land "not in triumph, but showered with offal" by the citizens of Acre.

=== War of the Lombards and the Barons' Crusade ===
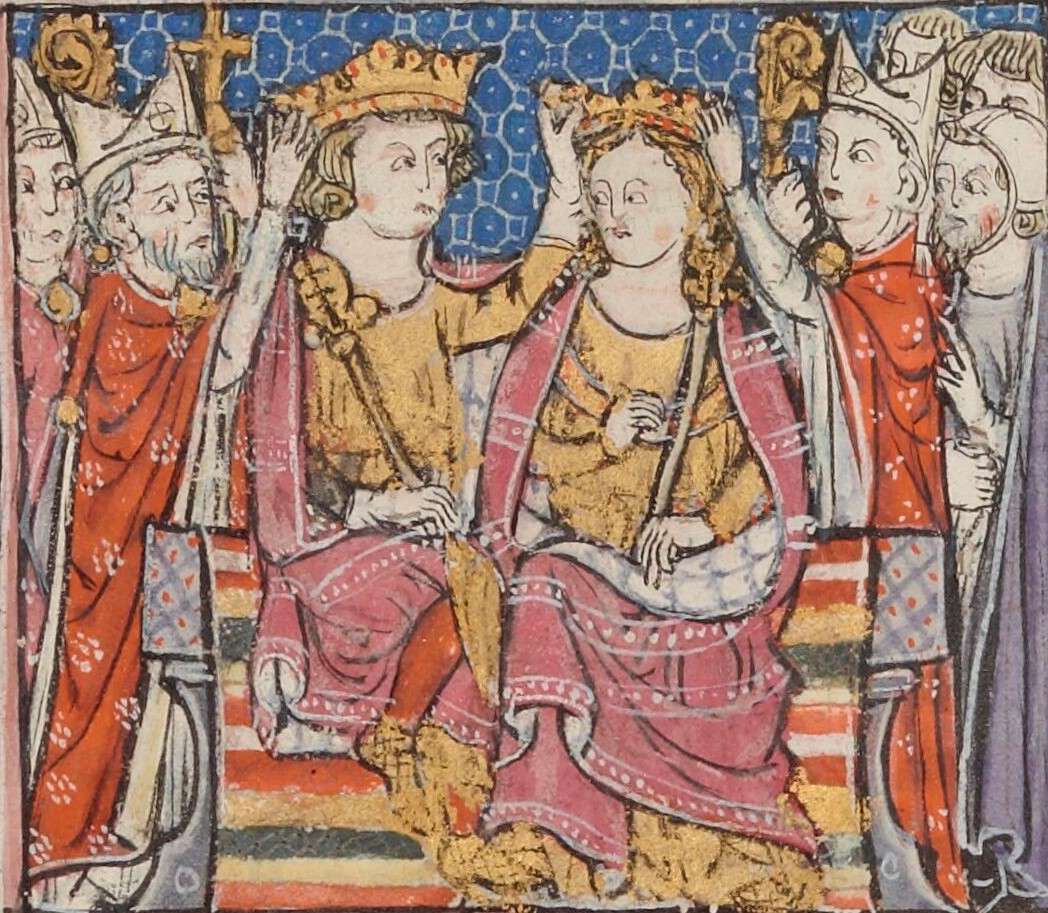
Coronation of Maria of Montferrat and John of Brienne, King of Jerusalem and Latin Emperor of Constantinople

Nevertheless, Frederick sent an Imperial army in 1231, under Richard Filangieri, who occupied Beirut and Tyre, but was unable to gain control of Acre. John's supporters formed a commune in Acre, of which John himself was elected mayor in 1232. With the help of the Genoese merchants, the commune recaptured Beirut. John also attacked Tyre, but was defeated by Filangieri at the Battle of Casal Imbert in May 1232.

In Cyprus, King Henry I came of age in 1232 and John's regency was no longer necessary. Both John and Filangieri raced back to Cyprus to assert their authority, and the imperial forces were defeated at the Battle of Agridi on June 15. Henry became the undisputed king of Cyprus, but continued to support the Ibelins over the Lusignans and the imperial party. On the mainland, Filangieri had the support of Bohemund IV of Antioch, the Teutonic Knights, the Knights Hospitaller, and the Pisan merchants. John was supported by his nobles on Cyprus, and by his continental holdings in Beirut, Caesarea, and Arsuf, as well as by the Knights Templar and the Genoese. Neither side could make any headway, and in 1234 Gregory IX excommunicated John and his supporters. This was partly revoked in 1235, but still no peace could be made. John died in 1236 and the war was taken up by his son Balian of Beirut and his nephew Philip of Montfort.

Meanwhile, the treaty with the Ayyubids was set to expire in 1239. Plans for a new crusade to be led by Frederick came to nothing, and Frederick himself was excommunicated by Gregory IX again in 1239. However, other European nobles took up the cause, including Theobald IV, Count of Champagne and King of Navarre, Peter of Dreux, and Amaury de Montfort, who arrived in Acre in September 1239. Theobald was elected leader of the crusade at a council in Acre, attended by most of the important nobles of the kingdom, including Walter of Brienne, John of Arsuf, and Balian of Sidon. The arrival of the crusade was a brief respite from the Lombard War; Filangieri remained in Tyre and did not participate. The council decided to refortify Ascalon in the south and attack Damascus in the north.

The crusaders may have been aware of the new divisions among the Ayyubids; al-Kamil had occupied Damascus in 1238 but had died soon afterwards, and his territory was inherited by his family. His sons al-Adil abu Bakr and as-Salih Ayyub inherited Egypt and Damascus. Ayyub marched on Cairo in an attempt to drive out al-Adil, but during his absence al-Kamil's brother as-Salih Isma'il took over Damascus, and Ayyub was taken prisoner by an-Nasir Dawud. The Crusaders, meanwhile, marched to Ascalon. Along the way, Walter of Brienne captured livestock intended to resupply Damascus, as the Ayyubids had probably learned of the Crusaders' plans to attack it. The victory was short-lived, however, as the Crusaders were then defeated by the Egyptian army at Gaza in November 1239. Henry II, Count of Bar was killed and Amaury of Montfort captured. The Crusaders returned to Acre, possibly because the native barons of the kingdom were suspicious of Filangieri in Tyre. Dawud took advantage of the Ayyubid victory to recapture Jerusalem in December, the ten-year truce having expired.

Although Ayyub was Dawud's prisoner, the two now allied against al-Adil in Egypt, which Ayyub seized in 1240. In Damascus, Isma'il recognized the threat of Dawud and Ayyub against his own possessions, and turned to the Crusaders for assistance. Theobald concluded a treaty with Isma'il, in return for territorial concessions that restored Jerusalem to Christian control, as well as much of the rest of the former kingdom, even more territory than Frederick had recovered in 1229. Theobald, however, was frustrated by the Lombard War, and returned home in September 1240. Almost immediately after Theobald's departure, Richard of Cornwall arrived. He completed the rebuilding of Ascalon, and also made peace with Ayyub in Egypt. Ayyub confirmed Isma'il's concessions in 1241, and prisoners taken at Gaza were exchanged by both sides. Richard returned to Europe in 1241.

Although the kingdom had essentially been restored, the Lombard War continued to occupy the kingdom's nobility. As the Templars and Hospitallers supported opposite sides, they also attacked each other, and the Templars broke the treaty with the Ayyubids by attacking Nablus in 1241. Conrad proclaimed that he had come of age in 1242, eliminating both Frederick's claim to the regency and the need for an imperial guardian to govern in his place, although he had not yet turned 15, the age of majority according to the customs of Jerusalem. Through Conrad, Frederick tried to send an imperial regent, but the anti-imperial faction in Acre argued that Jerusalem's laws allowed them to appoint their own regent. In June the Haute Cour granted the regency to Alice of Champagne, who, as the daughter of Isabella I, was Conrad's great-aunt and his closest relative living in the kingdom. Alice ordered Filangieri to be arrested, and along with the Ibelins and Venetians, besieged Tyre, which fell in July 1243. The Lombard War was over, but the king was still absent, as Conrad never came to the East. Alice was prevented from exercising any real power as regent by Philip of Montfort, who took control of Tyre, and Balian of Beirut, who continued to hold Acre.

=== Crusade of Louis IX ===
The Ayyubids were still divided between Ayyub in Egypt, Isma'il in Damascus, and Dawud in Kerak. Isma'il, Dawud, and al-Mansur Ibrahim of Homs went to war with Ayyub, who hired the Khwarazmians to fight for him. The Khwarazmians were nomadic Turks from central Asia, who had recently been displaced by the Mongols further to the east and were now residing in Mesopotamia. With Ayyub's support, they sacked Jerusalem in the summer of 1244, leaving it in ruins and useless to both Christians and Muslims. In October, the Khwarazmians, along with the Egyptian army under the command of Baibars, were met by the Frankish army, led by Philip of Montfort, Walter of Brienne, and the masters of the Templars, Hospitallers, and Teutonic Knights, along with al-Mansur and Dawud. On October 17 the Egyptian-Khwarazmian army destroyed the Frankish-Syrian coalition, and Walter of Brienne was taken captive and later executed. By 1247, Ayyub had reoccupied most of the territory that had been conceded in 1239, and had also gained control of Damascus.

A new crusade was discussed at the Council of Lyon in 1245 by Pope Innocent IV. The council deposed Frederick II, so no help could be expected from the empire, but King Louis IX of France had already vowed to go on crusade. Louis arrived in Cyprus in 1248, where he gathered an army of his own men, including his brothers Robert I of Artois, Charles I of Anjou, and Alphonse of Poitiers, and those of Cyprus and Jerusalem, led by the Ibelin family John of Jaffa, Guy of Ibelin, and Balian of Beirut. Once again the target was Egypt. Damietta was captured without resistance when the Crusaders landed in June 1249, but the crusade halted there until November, by which time the Egyptian sultan Ayyub had died and had been succeeded by his son Turanshah. In February, the Crusaders were defeated at the Battle of al-Mansurah, where Robert of Artois was killed.

The crusaders were unable to cross the Nile, and, suffering from disease and lack of supplies, retreated towards Damietta in April. They were defeated along the way at the Battle of Fariskur, with Louis being taken captive by Turanshah. During Louis' captivity, Turanshah was overthrown by his Mamluk soldiers, led by the general Aybak, who then released Louis in May in return for Damietta and a large ransom. For the next four years Louis resided in Acre, and helped refortify that city along with Caesarea, Jaffa, and Sidon. He also made truces with the Ayyubids in Syria, and sent embassies to negotiate with the Mongols, who were beginning to threaten the Muslim world, before returning home in 1254. He left behind a large garrison of French soldiers in Acre, under the command of Geoffrey of Sergines.

In the midst of these events, Alice of Champagne had died in 1246 and had been replaced as regent by her son King Henry I of Cyprus, for whom John of Jaffa served as bailli in Acre. During Louis IX's stay in Acre, Henry I died in 1253, and was succeeded in Cyprus by his infant son Hugh II. Hugh was technically regent of Jerusalem as well, both for Conrad and for Conrad's son Conradin after Conrad died in 1254. Both Cyprus and Jerusalem were governed by Hugh's mother Plaisance of Antioch, but John remained bailli for Hugh in Acre. John made peace with Damascus and attempted to regain Ascalon; the Egyptians, now ruled by the Mamluk Sultanate, besieged Jaffa in 1256 in response. John defeated them, and afterwards gave up the bailliage to his cousin John of Arsuf.

=== War of Saint Sabas ===
In 1256 the commercial rivalry between the Venetian and Genoese merchant colonies broke out into open warfare. In Acre, the two colonies disputed possession of the monastery of Saint Sabas. The Genoese, assisted by the Pisan merchants, attacked the Venetian quarter and burned their ships, but the Venetians drove them out. The Venetians were then expelled from Tyre by Philip of Monfort. John of Arsuf, John of Jaffa, John II of Beirut, the Templars, and the Teutonic Knights supported the Venetians, who also convinced the Pisans to join them, while the Hospitallers supported the Genoese. In 1257 the Venetians conquered the monastery and destroyed its fortifications, although they were unable to expel the Genoese completely. They blockaded the Genoese quarter, but the Genoese were supplied by the Hospitallers, whose complex was nearby, and by Philip of Montfort who sent food from Tyre. In August 1257, John of Arsuf tried to end the war by granting commercial rights in Acre to the Republic of Ancona, an Italian ally of Genoa, but aside from Philip of Montfort and the Hospitallers, the rest of the nobles continued to support Venice. In June 1258, Philip and the Hospitallers marched on Acre while a Genoese fleet attacked the city by sea. The naval battle was won by Venice, and the Genoese were forced to abandon their quarter and flee to Tyre with Philip. The war also spread to Tripoli and Antioch, where the Embriaco family, descended from Genoese crusaders, was pitted against Bohemond VI of Antioch, who supported the Venetians. In 1261 the Patriarch, Jacques Pantaleon, organised a council to re-establish order in the kingdom, though the Genoese did not return to Acre.

=== Mongols ===
It was during this period that the Mongols arrived in the Near East. Their presence further east had already displaced the Khwarazmians, and emissaries had been sent by various popes as well as Louis IX to ally or negotiate with them, but they were uninterested in alliances. They sacked Baghdad in 1258, and Aleppo and Damascus in 1260, destroying both the Abbasid caliphate and the last vestiges of the Ayyubid dynasty. Hethum I of Armenia and Bohemond VI of Antioch had already submitted to the Mongols as vassals. Some of the Mongols were Nestorian Christians, including Kitbuqa, one of the generals at the sieges of Baghdad and Damascus, but despite this, the nobles of Acre refused to submit. As the kingdom was by now a relatively unimportant state, the Mongols paid little attention to it, but there were a few skirmishes in 1260: the forces of Julian of Sidon killed the nephew of Kitbuqa, who responded by sacking Sidon, and John II of Beirut was also captured by the Mongols during another raid. The apparently inevitable Mongol conquest was stalled when Hulagu, the Mongol commander in Syria, returned home after the death of his brother Möngke Khan, leaving Kitbuqa with a small garrison. The Mamluks of Egypt then sought, and were granted, permission to advance through Frankish territory, and defeated the Mongols at the Battle of Ain Jalut in September 1260. Kitbuqa was killed and all of Syria fell under Mamluk control. On the way back to Egypt, the Mamluk sultan Qutuz was assassinated by the general Baibars, who was far less favourable than his predecessor to alliances with the Franks.

=== Fall of Acre ===
John of Arsuf had died in 1258 and was replaced as bailli by Geoffrey of Sergines, Louis IX's lieutenant in Acre. Plaisance died in 1261, but as her son Hugh II was still underage, Cyprus passed to his cousin Hugh of Antioch-Lusignan, whose mother Isabella of Cyprus (Alice of Champagne and Hugh I of Cyprus' daughter and Hugh II's aunt) took over the regency in Acre. She appointed, as bailli, her husband Henry of Antioch (who was also Plaisance's uncle), but died in 1264. The regency in Acre was then claimed by Hugh of Antioch-Lusignan and his cousin Hugh of Brienne, and Hugh II died in 1267 before he reached the age of majority. Hugh of Antioch-Lusignan won the dispute and succeeded Hugh II on Cyprus as Hugh III. When Conradin was executed in Sicily in 1268, there was no other Hohenstaufen heir to succeed him, and Hugh III inherited the Kingdom of Jerusalem as well in 1269. This was disputed by another branch of the Lusignan family: Maria of Antioch claimed the throne as the closest living descendant of Isabella I, but for the moment her claim was ignored. By this time, the Mamluks under Baibars were taking advantage of the kingdom's constant disputes, and began conquering the remaining crusader cities along the coast. In 1265, Baibars took Caesarea, Haifa and Arsuf, and Safad and Toron in 1266. In 1268 he captured Jaffa and Beaufort, and then besieged and destroyed Antioch.

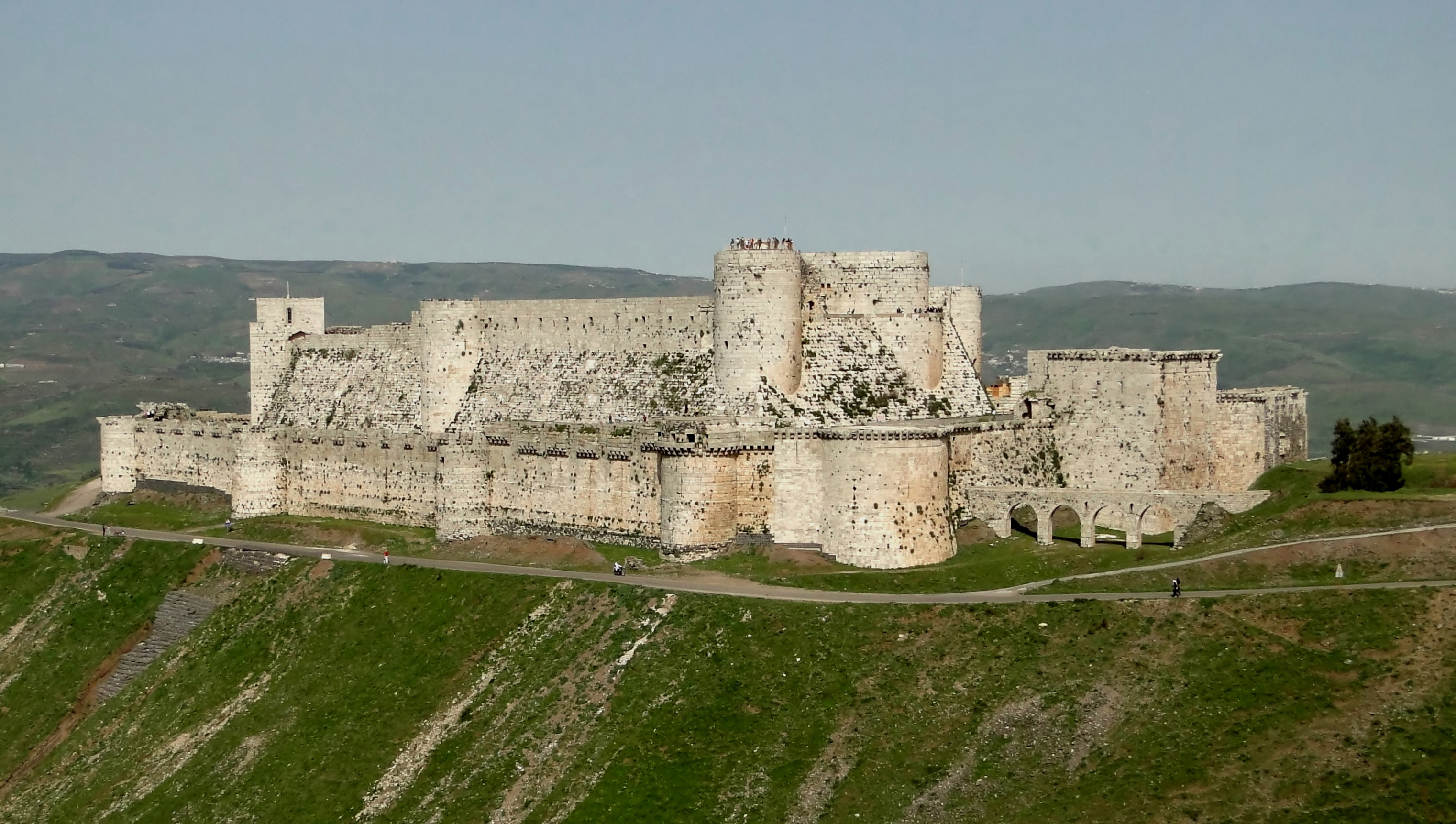
Krak des Chevaliers, Syria. UNESCO World Heritage Site

Hugh III and Baibars made a one-year truce after these conquests; Baibars knew that Louis IX was planning another crusade from Europe, and assumed that the target would once again be Egypt. But instead the crusade was diverted to Tunis, where Louis died. Baibars was free to continue his campaigns: in 1270 he had the Assassins kill Philip of Montfort, and in 1271 he captured the Hospitaller and Teutonic Knights strongholds of Krak des Chevaliers and Montfort Castle. He also besieged Tripoli, but abandoned it in May when Prince Edward of England (Edward I in the future) arrived, the only part of Louis IX's crusade to arrive in the east. Edward could do nothing except arrange a ten-year truce with Baibars, who nevertheless attempted to have him assassinated as well.

Edward left in 1272, and despite the Second Council of Lyon's plans for another crusade in 1274, no further large-scale expedition ever arrived. Hugh III's authority on the mainland began to break down; he was an unpopular king, and Beirut, the only territory left outside of Acre and Tyre, started to act independently. Its heiress, Isabella of Ibelin (widow of Hugh II), actually placed it under Baibars' protection. Finding the mainland ungovernable, Hugh III left for Cyprus, leaving Balian of Arsuf as bailli. Then in 1277, Maria of Antioch sold her claim to the kingdom to Charles of Anjou, who sent Roger of San Severino to represent him. The Venetians and Templars supported the claim, and Balian was powerless to oppose him. Baibars died in 1277 and was succeeded by Qalawun. In 1281 the ten-year truce expired and was renewed by Roger. Roger returned to Europe after the Sicilian Vespers in 1282, and was replaced by Odo Poilechien.

Hugh III attempted to re-assert his authority on the mainland in 1283, but failed and he died in Tyre in 1284. He was succeeded briefly by his son John II, who died soon after in 1285, and was succeeded by his brother, Hugh III's other son Henry II. That year Qalawun captured the Hospitaller fortress of Marqab. Charles of Anjou also died in 1285, and the military orders and the commune of Acre accepted Henry II as king; Odo Poilechen refused to recognize him, but was allowed to hand Acre over to the Templars rather than Henry directly, and the Templars then handed it to the king. War broke out between the Venetians and Genoese again in 1287, and Tripoli fell to Qalawun in 1289. Although it was only a matter of time before Acre also fell, the end of the crusader kingdom was actually instigated in 1290 by newly arrived Crusaders, who rioted in Acre and attacked the city's Muslim merchants.

Qalawun died before he could retaliate, but his son al-Ashraf Khalil arrived to besiege Acre in April 1291. Acre was defended by Henry II's brother Amalric of Tyre, the Hospitallers, Templars, and Teutonic Knights, the Venetians and Pisans, the French garrison led by Jean I de Grailly, and the English garrison led by Otton de Grandson, but they were vastly outnumbered. Henry II himself arrived in May during the siege, but the city fell on May 18. Henry, Amalric, Otton, and Jean escaped, as did a young Templar named Roger de Flor, but most of the other defenders did not, including the master of the Templars Guillaume de Beaujeu. Tyre fell without a fight the next day, Sidon fell in June, and Beirut in July.

The Crusaders moved their headquarters north to cities such as Tortosa, but lost that too, and were forced to relocate their headquarters offshore to Cyprus. Some naval raids and attempts to retake territory were made over the next ten years, but with the loss of the island of Arwad in 1302–1303, the Kingdom of Jerusalem ceased to exist on the mainland.

== Life in the early kingdom ==
Animation of twelfth-century Jerusalem, Latin with English subtitles

The Latin population of the kingdom was always small; although a steady stream of settlers and new crusaders continually arrived, most of the original crusaders who fought in the First Crusade simply went home. According to William of Tyre, "barely three hundred knights and two thousand foot soldiers could be found" in the kingdom in 1100 during Godfrey's siege of Arsuf. From the very beginning, the Latins were little more than a colonial frontier exercising rule over the native Jewish, Samaritan, Muslim, Greek Orthodox, and Syriac populations.

As new generations grew up in the kingdom, they began to think of themselves as natives. Although they never gave up their core identity as Western Europeans or Franks, their clothing, diet, and commercialism integrated much oriental, particularly Byzantine, influence. As the chronicler Fulcher of Chartres wrote around 1124,

For we who were Occidentals now have been made Orientals. He who was a Roman or Frank has in this land been made into a Galilaean, or an inhabitant of Palestine. He who was of Rheims or Chartres has now become a citizen of Tyre or Antioch. We have already forgotten the places of our birth; already they have become unknown to many of us, or, at least, are unmentioned.

The crusaders and their descendants often learned to speak Greek, Arabic, and other eastern languages, and intermarried with the native Christians (whether Greek, Syriac, or Armenian) and sometimes with converted Muslims. Nonetheless, the Frankish principalities remained a distinctive Occidental colony in the heart of Islam.

Fulcher, a participant in the First Crusade and chaplain of Baldwin I, continued his chronicle up to 1127. Fulcher's chronicle was very popular and was used as a source by other historians in the West, such as Orderic Vitalis and William of Malmesbury. Almost as soon as Jerusalem had been captured, and continuing throughout the 12th century, many pilgrims arrived and left accounts of the new kingdom; among them are the English Sæwulf, the Kievan Abbot Daniel, the Frank Fretellus, the Byzantine Johannes Phocas, and the Germans John of Würzburg and Theoderich. Aside from these, thereafter there is no eyewitness to events in Jerusalem until William of Tyre, archbishop of Tyre and chancellor of Jerusalem, who began writing around 1167 and died around 1184, although he includes much information about the First Crusade and the intervening years from the death of Fulcher to his own time, drawn mainly from the writings of Albert of Aix and Fulcher himself.

From the Muslim perspective, a chief source of information is Usamah ibn Munqidh, a soldier and frequent ambassador from Damascus to Jerusalem and Egypt, whose memoirs, Kitab al i'tibar, include lively accounts of crusader society in the east. Further information can be gathered from travellers such as Benjamin of Tudela and Ibn Jubayr.

=== Crusader society ===
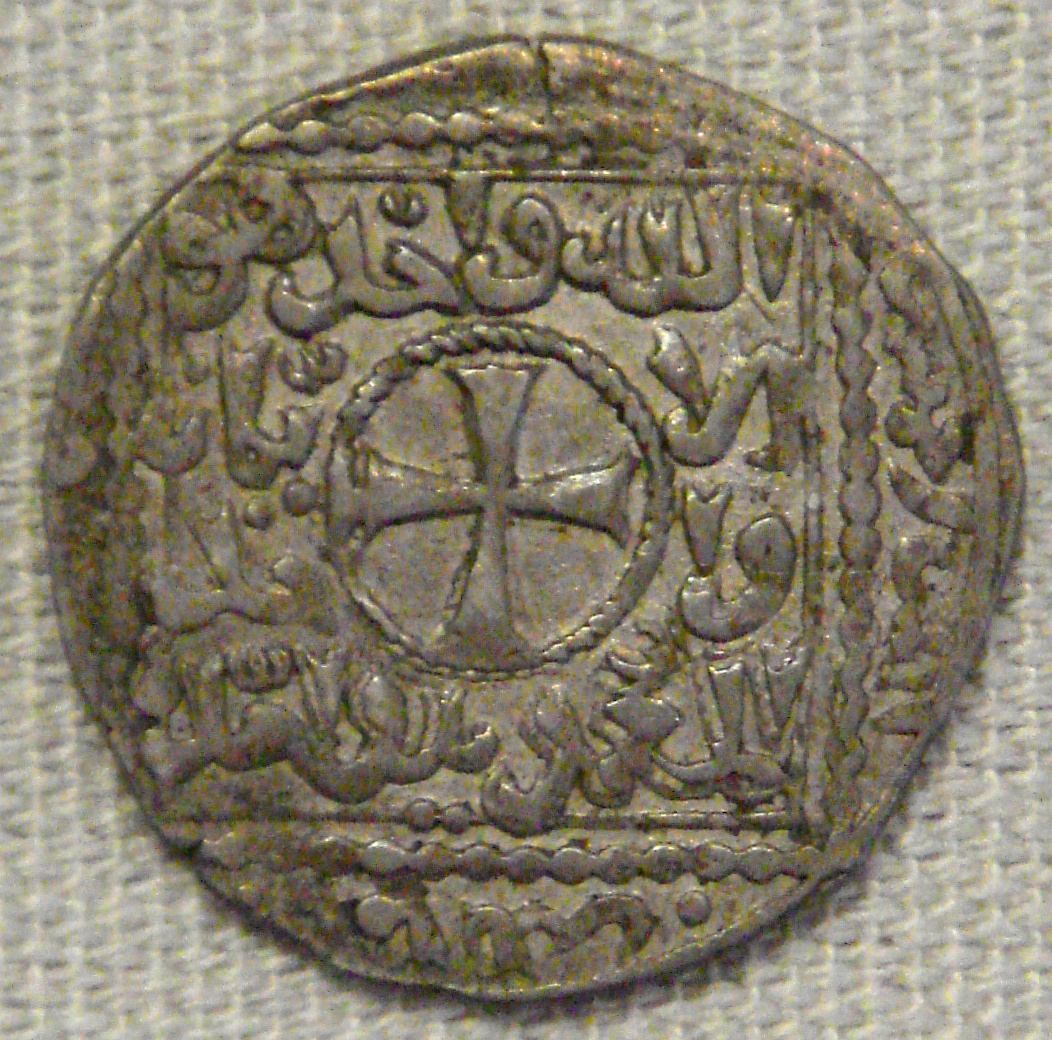
Crusaders coin, Acre, 1230

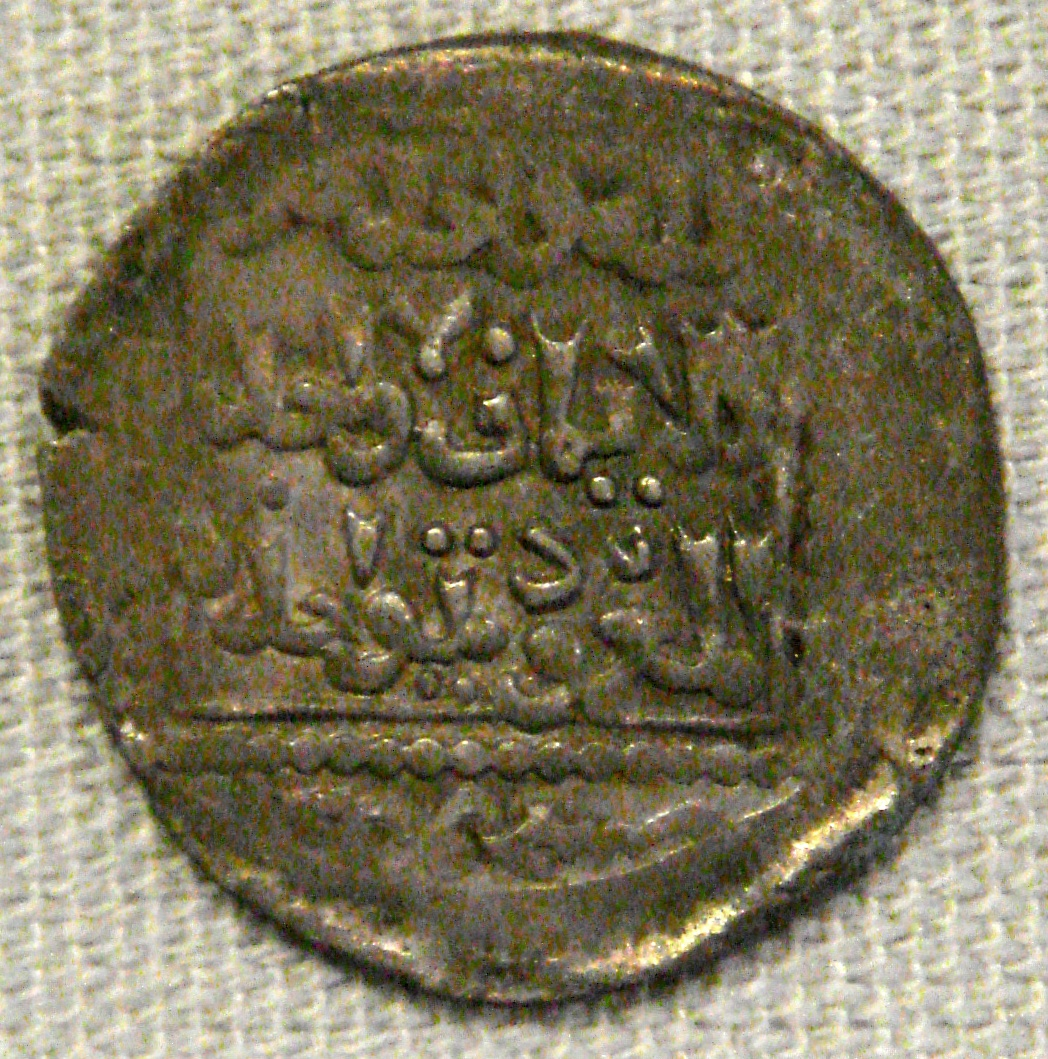
Crusaders coin, Acre, c. 1230

The Kingdom at first was virtually bereft of a loyal subject population and had few knights to implement the laws and orders of the realm. With the arrival of Italian trading firms, the creation of the military orders, and immigration by European knights, artisans, and farmers, the affairs of the Kingdom improved and a feudal society developed, similar to but distinct from the society the crusaders knew in Europe. The nature of this society has long been a subject of debate among crusade historians.

In the 19th and early 20th centuries, French scholars, such as E. G. Rey, Gaston Dodu, and René Grousset presumed that the Crusaders, Muslims and Christians lived in a totally integrated society. Ronnie Ellenblum claims this view was influenced by French imperialism and colonialism; if medieval French crusaders could integrate themselves into local society, then certainly modern French colonies in the Levant could thrive. In the mid-20th century, scholars such as Joshua Prawer, R. C. Smail, Meron Benvenisti, and Claude Cahen argued instead that the Crusaders lived totally segregated from the native inhabitants, who were thoroughly Arabicized and/or Islamicized and were a constant threat to the foreign crusaders. Prawer argued further that the kingdom was an early attempt at colonization, in which the Crusaders were a small ruling class, who were dependent on the native population for survival but made no attempt to integrate with them.For this reason, the rural European society to which the Crusaders were accustomed was replaced by a more secure urban society in the pre-existing cities of the Levant.

According to Ellenblum's interpretation, the inhabitants of the Kingdom (Latin Christians living alongside native Greek and Syriac Christians, Shia and Sunni Arabs, Sufis, Bedouin, Druze, Jews, and Samaritans) all had major differences between each other as well as with the crusaders. Relations between eastern Christians and the Latin Crusaders were "complex and ambiguous", not simply friendly or hostile. He argues that Eastern Christians probably felt closer ties to their fellow Christian crusaders than Muslim Arabs. The Crusaders were neither totally integrated with the native population, nor segregated in the cities away from the rural natives; rather they settled in both urban and rural areas; specifically, in areas traditionally inhabited by Eastern Christians. Areas that were traditionally Muslim had very little crusader settlement, just as they already had very few native Christian inhabitants.

Into this mixed society the crusaders adapted existing institutions and introduced their familiar customs from Europe. As in Europe the nobles had vassals and were themselves vassals to the king. Agricultural production was regulated by the iqta, a Muslim system of land ownership and payments roughly (though far from exactly) equivalent to the feudal system of Europe, and this system was not heavily disrupted by the Crusaders.

As Hans Mayer says, "the Muslim inhabitants of the Latin Kingdom hardly ever appear in the Latin chronicles", so information on their role in society is difficult to find. The Crusaders "had a natural tendency to ignore these matters as simply without interest and certainly not worthy of record." Although Muslims, as well as Jews and Eastern Christians, had virtually no rights in the countryside, where they were essentially the property of the crusader lord who owned the land, (Note: Mayer calls them "chattels of the state".) tolerance for other faiths was, in general, no higher or lower than that found elsewhere in the Middle East. Greeks, Syriacs, and Jews continued to live as they had before, subject to their own laws and courts, with their former Muslim overlords simply replaced by the Crusaders; Muslims now joined them at the lowest level of society. The ra'is, the leader of a Muslim or Syriac community, was a kind of vassal to whatever noble owned his land, but as the crusader nobles were absentee landlords the ra'is and their communities had a high degree of autonomy.

Arab-Andalusian geographer and traveller Ibn Jubayr, who was hostile to the Franks, described the Muslims living under the Christian crusaders' Kingdom of Jerusalem in the late 12th-century:

We left Tibnin by a road running past farms where Muslims live who do very well under the Franks-may Allah preserve us from such a temptation! The regulations imposed on them are the handing over of half of the grain crop at the time of harvest and the payment of a poll tax of one dinar and seven qirats, together with a light duty on their fruit trees. The Muslims own their own houses and rule themselves in their own way. This is the way the farms and big villages are organized in Frankish territory. Many Muslims are sorely tempted to settle here when they see the far from comfortable conditions in which their brethren live in the districts under Muslim rule. Unfortunately for the Muslims, they always have reason for complaint about the injustices of their chiefs in the lands governed by their coreligionists, whereas they can have nothing but praise for the conduct of the Franks, whose justice they can always rely on.

In the cities, Muslims and Eastern Christians were free, although no Muslims were permitted to live in Jerusalem itself. They were second-class citizens and played no part in politics or law, and owed no military service to the crown, although in some cities they may have been the majority of the population. Likewise, citizens of the Italian city-states owed nothing as they lived in autonomous quarters in the port cities.

21st century positions on the question of cultural integration or cultural apartheid remain divergent. Interactions between the Franks and the native Muslims and Christians, though muddled, exhibited a practical coexistence. Though likely overstated, the accounts of Usamah Ibn-Munqidh of Shaizar's travels through Antioch and Jerusalem described a level of aristocratic exchange elevated above ethnic prejudice. Contact between Muslims and Christians came on the administrative or personal level (on the basis of taxes or translation), not communal or cultural, representative of a hierarchical lord over subject relationship. Evidence of inter-cultural integration remains scarce, but evidence of inter-cultural cooperation and complex social interaction proves more common. Key use of the word dragoman, literally translator, with Syriac administrators and Arabic headsmen represented the direct need for negotiation of interests on both sides.

Comments on households with Arabic-speaking Christians and a few Arabized Jews and Muslims represent a less dichotomous relationship than the mid-20th-century historians depicted. Rather, the commonality of Frankish Christians having non-Frankish priests, doctors, and other roles within households and inter-cultural communities presents the lack of standardized discrimination. Jerusalemite William of Tyre complained about a trend to hire Jewish or Muslim medical practitioners over their Latin and Frankish counterparts. Evidence even indicates alterations to Frankish cultural and social customs regarding hygiene (notorious amongst Arabs for their lack of washing and knowledge of bathhouse culture), going so far as to ensure water supplies for domestic use in addition to irrigation.

=== Population ===
It is impossible to give an accurate estimate of the population of the kingdom. Josiah Russell calculates that all of Syria had about 2.3 million people at the time of the crusades, with perhaps eleven thousand villages; most of these, of course, were outside of crusader rule even at the greatest extent of all four crusader states. It has been estimated by scholars such as Joshua Prawer and Meron Benvenisti that there were at most 120,000 Franks and 100,000 Muslims living in the cities, with another 250,000 Muslim and Eastern Christian peasants in the countryside. The Crusaders accounted for 15–25% of the total population.

Benjamin Z. Kedar estimates that there were between 300,000 and 360,000 non-Franks in the Kingdom, 250,000 of whom were villagers in the countryside, and "one may assume that Muslims were in the majority in some, possibly most parts of the kingdom of Jerusalem…" As Ronnie Ellenblum points out, there simply is not enough existing evidence to accurately count the population and any estimate is inherently unreliable. Contemporary chronicler William of Tyre recorded the census of 1183, which was intended to determine the number of men available to defend against an invasion, and to determine the amount of tax money that could be obtained from the inhabitants, Muslim or Christian. If the population was actually counted, William did not record the number. In the 13th century, John of Ibelin drew up a list of fiefs and the number of knights owed by each, but this gives no indication of the non-noble, non-Latin population.

The Mamluks, led by Baibars, eventually made good their pledge to cleanse the entire Middle East of the Franks. With the fall of Antioch (1268), Tripoli (1289), and Acre (1291), those Christians unable to leave the cities were massacred or enslaved and the last traces of Christian rule in the Levant disappeared.

=== Slavery ===
An unknown number of Muslim slaves lived in the Kingdom. There was a very large slave market in Acre that functioned throughout the twelfth and thirteenth centuries. Italian merchants were sometimes accused of selling Southeastern European Christians as slaves along with Muslim slaves. Slavery was less common than ransom, especially for prisoners of war; the large numbers of prisoners taken during raids and battles every year ensured that ransom money flowed freely between the Christian and Muslim states. Escape for prisoners and slaves was probably not difficult, as the inhabitants of the countryside were majority Muslim, and fugitive slaves were always a problem. The only legal means of manumission was conversion to (Catholic) Christianity. No Christian, whether Western or Eastern, was permitted by law to be sold into slavery.

The assizes of Jerusalem provided a legal framework for slavery in the Kingdom. The document stipulated that "villeins, animals or some other chattel" could be traded. "Villeins" were rural semi-free laborers akin to serfs. There were also multiple ways to become chattel slaves. People could be slaves by birth, enslaved by being captured in a raid, or as a penalty for debt or for helping a runaway slave. The nomadic Bedouin tribes were considered to be the property of the king and under his protection. They could be sold or alienated just like any other property, and later in the 12th century, they were often under the protection of a lesser noble or one of the military orders.

=== Economy ===
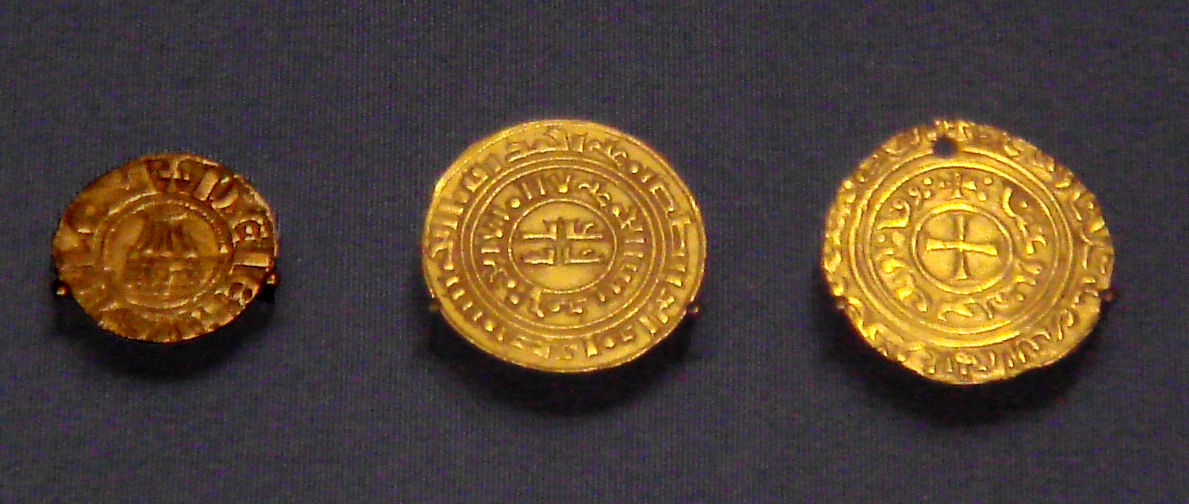
Crusader coins of the Kingdom of Jerusalem. Left: Denier in European style with Holy Sepulchre (1162–75). Center: Kufic gold bezant (1140–80). Right: gold bezant with Christian symbol (1250s). Gold coins were first copied dinars and bore Kufic script, but after 1250 Christian symbols were added following Papal complaints (British Museum).

The urban composition of the area, combined with the presence of the Italian merchants, led to the development of an economy that was much more commercial than it was agricultural. Palestine had always been a crossroads for trade; now, this trade extended to Europe as well. European goods, such as the woolen textiles of northern Europe, made their way to the Middle East and Asia, while Asian goods were transported back to Europe. Jerusalem was especially involved in the silk, cotton and spice trade; other items that first appeared in Europe through trade with crusader Jerusalem included oranges and sugar, the latter of which chronicler William of Tyre called "very necessary for the use and health of mankind." In the countryside, wheat, barley, legumes, olives, grapes, and dates were grown. The Italian city-states made enormous profits from this trade, thanks to commercial treaties like the Pactum Warmundi, and it influenced their Renaissance in later centuries.

Colonies of Genoa and Venice in Palestine also took on agricultural ventures in their concessions. They especially cultivated sugar for export to Europe. Sugar cane had been introduced in Palestine by the Arabs. To work on the sugar fields, Italian colonists utilized slaves or serfs of Arab or Syrian origin, or local serfs. Sugar manufacturing began in Tyre. In the 13th century, sugar production continued to increase in Palestine, and merchants could export it duty-free through the port of Acre until its conquest in 1291. The sugar exploitation system pioneered in the Kingdom of Jerusalem is seen as a precursor to the sugar plantations in the Americas.

Jerusalem collected money through tribute payments, first from the coastal cities which had not yet been captured, and later from other neighbouring states such as Damascus and Egypt, which the Crusaders could not conquer directly. After Baldwin I extended his rule over Oultrejordain, Jerusalem gained revenue from the taxation of Muslim caravans passing from Syria to Egypt or Arabia. The money economy of Jerusalem meant that their manpower problem could be partially solved by paying for mercenaries, an uncommon occurrence in medieval Europe. Mercenaries could be fellow European crusaders, or, perhaps more often, Muslim soldiers, including the famous Turcopoles.

=== Education ===
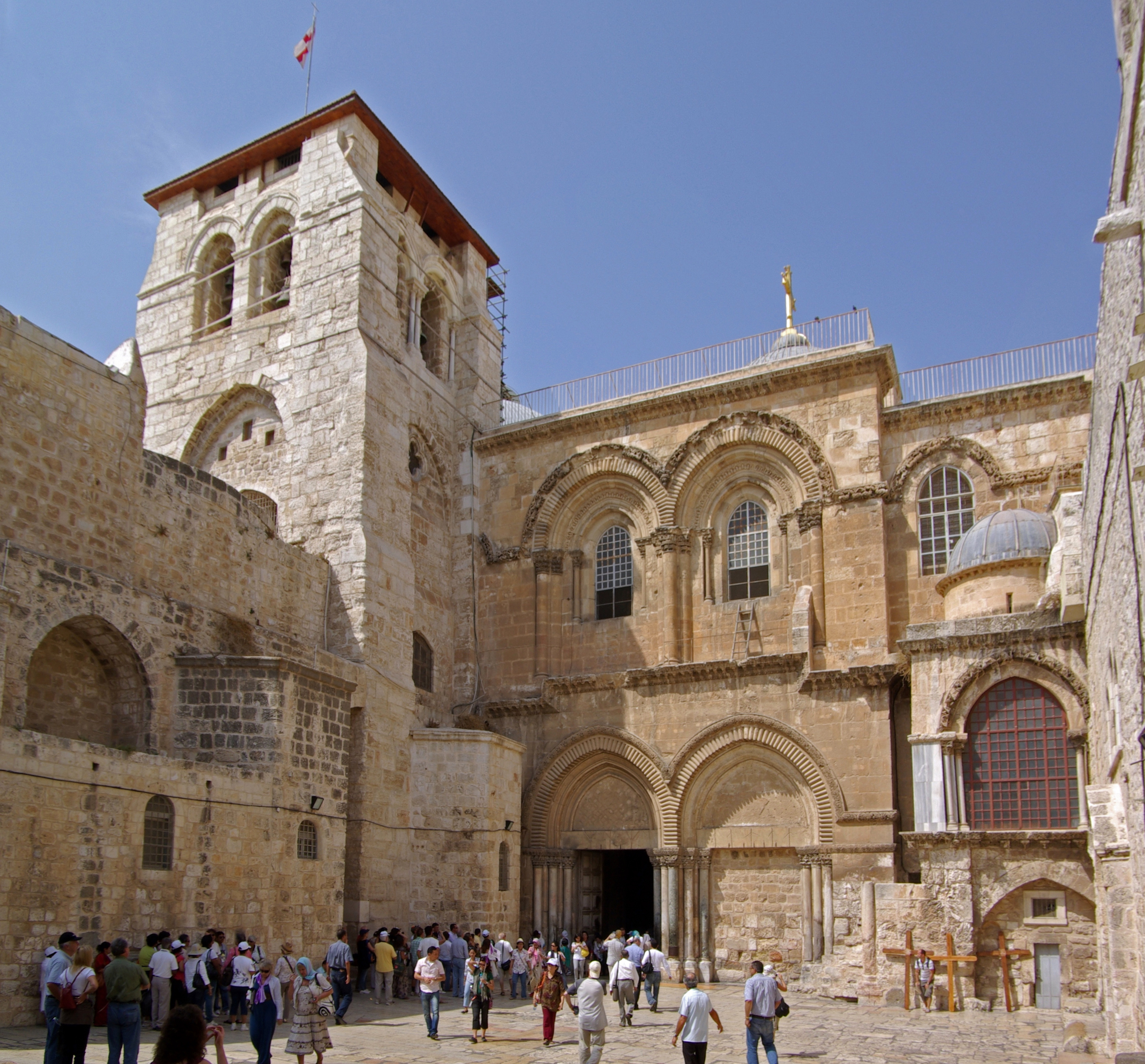
Main entrance to the Church of the Holy Sepulchre

Jerusalem was the centre of education in the kingdom. There was a school in the Church of the Holy Sepulchre, where the basic skills of reading and writing Latin were taught; The relative wealth of the merchant class meant that their children could be educated there along with the children of nobles – it is likely that William of Tyre was a classmate of future king Baldwin III. Higher education had to be undertaken at one of the universities in Europe; the development of a university was impossible in the culture of crusader Jerusalem, where warfare was far more important than philosophy or theology. Nonetheless, the nobility and general Frankish population were noted for their high literacy: lawyers and clerks were in abundance, and the study of law, history, and other academic subjects was a beloved pastime of the royal family and the nobility. Jerusalem had an extensive library not only of ancient and medieval Latin works but of Arabic literature, much of which was apparently captured from Usamah ibn Munqidh and his entourage after a shipwreck in 1154. The Holy Sepulchre contained the kingdom's scriptorium and the city had a chancery where royal charters and other documents were produced. Aside from Latin, the standard written language of medieval Europe, the populace of crusader Jerusalem communicated in vernacular forms of French and Italian; Greek, Armenian, and even Arabic were used by Frankish settlers.

=== Art and architecture ===
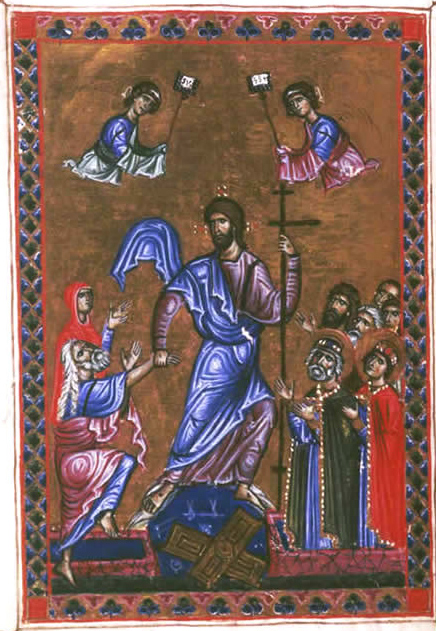
Melisende Psalter Folio 9v – The Harrowing of Hell

In Jerusalem itself, the greatest architectural endeavour was the expansion of the Church of the Holy Sepulchre in western Gothic style. This expansion consolidated all the separate shrines on the site into one building, and was completed by 1149. Outside of Jerusalem, castles and fortresses were the major focus of construction: Kerak and Montreal in Oultrejordain and Ibelin near Jaffa are among the numerous examples of crusader castles.

Crusader art was a mix of Western, Byzantine, and Islamic styles. The major cities featured baths, interior plumbing, and other advanced hygienic tools which were lacking in most other cities and towns throughout the world. The foremost examples of crusader art are perhaps the Melisende Psalter, an illuminated manuscript commissioned between 1135 and 1143 and now located in the British Library, and the sculpted Nazareth Capitals. Paintings and mosaics were popular forms of art in the kingdom, but many of these were destroyed by the Mamluks in the 13th century; only the most durable fortresses survived the reconquest.

=== Government and legal system ===
Immediately after the First Crusade, land was distributed to loyal vassals of Godfrey, forming numerous feudal lordships within the kingdom. This was continued by Godfrey's successors. The number and importance of the lordships varied throughout the twelfth and thirteenth centuries, and many cities were part of the royal domain. The king was assisted by a number of officers of state. The king and the royal court were normally located in Jerusalem, but due to the prohibition on Muslim inhabitants, the capital was small and underpopulated. The king just as often held court at Acre, Nablus, Tyre, or wherever else he happened to be. In Jerusalem, the royal family lived firstly on the Temple Mount, before the foundation of the Knights Templar, and later in the palace complex surrounding the Tower of David; there was another palace complex in Acre.

Because the nobles tended to live in Jerusalem rather than on estates in the countryside, they had a larger influence on the king than they would have had in Europe. The nobles, along with the bishops, formed the haute cour (French for 'high court'), which was responsible for confirming the election of a new king (or a regent if necessary), collecting taxes, minting coins, allotting money to the king, and raising armies. The haute cour was the only judicial body for the nobles of the kingdom, hearing criminal cases such as murder, rape, and treason, and simpler feudal disputes such as the recovery of slaves, sales and purchases of fiefs, and default of service. Punishments included forfeiture of land and exile, or in extreme cases death. The first laws of the kingdom were, according to tradition, established during Godfrey of Bouillon's short reign, but were more probably established by Baldwin II at the Council of Nablus in 1120. Benjamin Z. Kedar argued that the canons of the Council of Nablus were in force in the 12th century but had fallen out of use by the thirteenth. Marwan Nader questions this and suggests that the canons may not have applied to the whole kingdom at all times.The most extensive collection of laws, together known as the Assizes of Jerusalem, were written in the mid-13th century, although many of them are purported to be twelfth-century in origin.

There were other, lesser courts for non-nobles and non-Latins; the Cour des Bourgeois provided justice for non-noble Latins, dealing with minor criminal offences such as assault and theft, and provided rules for disputes between non-Latins, who had fewer legal rights. Special courts such as the Cour de la Fond (for commercial disputes in the markets) and the Cour de la Mer (an admiralty court) existed in the coastal cities. The extent to which native Islamic and Eastern Christian courts continued to function is unknown, but the ra'is probably exercised some legal authority on a local level. The Cour des Syriens judged non-criminal matters among the native Christians (the "Syriacs"). For criminal matters, non-Latins were to be tried in the Cour des Bourgeois (or even the Haute Cour if the crime was sufficiently severe).

The Italian communes were granted almost complete autonomy from the very early days of the Kingdom, thanks to their military and naval support in the years following the First Crusade. This autonomy included the right to administer their own justice, although the kinds of cases that fell under their jurisdiction varied at different times. The king was recognised as head of the Haute Cour, although he was legally only primus inter pares.

== Legacy ==
After the loss of all territory in the Levant in 1291, there were late attempts at further crusades, nominally proposing to recapture Jerusalem, but with the rise of the Ottoman Empire their character was more and more that of a desperate defensive war rarely reaching beyond the Balkans (Alexandrian Crusade, Smyrniote crusades). Henry IV of England made a pilgrimage to Jerusalem in 1393–4, and he later vowed to lead a crusade to recapture the city, but he did not undertake such a campaign before his death in 1413. The Levant remained under Ottoman control from 1517 until the Partition of the Ottoman Empire in 1918.With the Fall of Ruad in 1302, the Kingdom of Jerusalem lost its final outpost on the Levantine coast, its possession closest to the Holy Land now being Cyprus.

Henry II of Jerusalem retained the title of king of Jerusalem until his death in 1324, and the title continued to be claimed by his successors, the kings of Cyprus. The title of "king of Jerusalem" was also continuously used by the Angevin kings of Naples, whose founder, Charles of Anjou, had in 1277 bought a claim to the throne from Mary of Antioch. Thereafter, this claim to the Kingdom of Jerusalem was treated as a tributary of the crown of Naples, which often changed hands by testament or conquest rather than direct inheritance. As Naples was a papal fief, the Popes often endorsed the title of King of Jerusalem as well as of Naples, and the history of these claims is that of the Neapolitan Kingdom.

In 1441, control of the Kingdom of Naples was lost to Alfonso V of Aragon and the title thus was claimed by the kings of Spain. The title is still in use by the Spanish Crown, currently held by Felipe VI of Spain. It was also claimed by Otto von Habsburg as Habsburg pretender until 1958, and by the kings of Italy until 1946.

== See also ==
- Assizes of Jerusalem
- Haute Cour of Jerusalem
- History of Palestine
- History of Jerusalem during the Kingdom of Jerusalem
- King of Jerusalem
- Officers of the Kingdom of Jerusalem
- Timeline of Jerusalem
- Vassals of the Kingdom of Jerusalem

== Bibliography ==
- of Aachen, Albert (2013). History of the Journey to Jerusalem. Translated by Edgington, Susan. Surrey: Ashgate Publishing Limited. ISBN 978-1-40946-652-9.
- d'Aguilers, Raymond (1968). Historia Francorum qui ceperunt Iherusalem. Translated by Hill, John Hugh; Hill, Laurita L. Philadelphia: The American Philosophical Society.
- Boas, Adrian (2001). Jerusalem In The Time Of The Crusades. London: Routledge. ISBN 0-415-23000-4.
- Housley, Norman; et al. (The New Cambridge Medieval History) (2008). "The thirteenth-century crusades in the Mediterranean". In David Abulafia (ed.). c. 1198 – c. 1300. Vol. V. Cambridge: Cambridge University Press. ISBN 0-521-36289-X.
- Hosler, John D. (2022). Jerusalem Falls: Seven Centuries of War and Peace. New Haven: Yale University Press. ISBN 978-0-300-26869-0.
- Murray, Allan V. (2000). The Crusader Kingdom of Jerusalem: A Dynastic History 1099-1125. Oxford: Prosopographica et Genealogica. ISBN 1-900934-03-5.
- Runciman, Steven (1957). The Kingdom of Jerusalem and the Frankish East 1100-1187. A History of the Crusades. Vol. II. Cambridge: Cambridge University Press.
- Runciman, Steven (1955). The Kingdom of Acre and the later Crusades. A History of the Crusades. Vol. III. Cambridge: Cambridge University Press.
- Tyerman, Christopher (2006). God's War: A New History of the Crusades. Cambridge, Mass.: Harvard University Press. ISBN 0-6-7402-387-0.
- Longnon, John; et al. (A History Of The Crusades) (1969). "The Frankish States in Greece 1204–1311". In Robert Lee Wolff, Harry W. Hazard (ed.). The Later Crusades 1189–1311. Vol. II. Madison: The University of Wisconsin Press.
- Furber, Elizabeth; et al. (A History Of The Crusades) (1969). "The Kingdom of Cyprus 1191–1291". In Robert Lee Wolff, Harry W. Hazard (ed.). The Later Crusades 1189–1311. Vol. II. Madison: The University of Wisconsin Press.
- Fulcher of Chartres (1969). Historia Hierosolymitana [A History of the Expedition to Jerusalem, 1095–1127]. Translated by Frances, Rita Ryan. Knoxville: University of Tennessee Press.
- William of Tyre (1943). Historia rerum in partibus transmarinis gestarum [A History of Deeds Done Beyond the Sea]. Translated by Babcock, E.A.; Krey, A.C. New York: Columbia University Press.
- Usama ibn Munqidh (1987). كتاب الاعتبار [An Arab-Syrian Gentleman and Warrior in the Period of the Crusades; Memoirs of Usamah ibn-Munqidh]. Translated by Hitti, Philip K. Princeton: Princeton University Press. ISBN 0-69107-746-0.
- Gil, Moshe (1997) [1983]. A History of Palestine, 634–1099. Translated by Ethel Broido. Cambridge: Cambridge University Press. ISBN 0-521-59984-9.
- Hamilton, Bernard (2000). The Leper King and his Heirs. Cambridge: Cambridge University Press. ISBN 978-1-316-34763-8.
- Hillenbrand, Carole (2000). The Crusades: Islamic Perspectives. London: Routledge. ISBN 978-1-57958-354-5.
- Holt, P. M. (1989). The Age of the Crusades: The Near East from the Eleventh Century to 1517. London: Longman. ISBN 978-0-582-49302-5.
- Edbury, Peter W. (1991). The Kingdom of Cyprus and the Crusades, 1191-1374. Cambridge: Cambridge University Press. ISBN 0-511-56-240-3.
- Humphreys, R. S. (1977). From Saladin to the Mongols: The Ayyubids of Damascus, 1193–1260. Albany: State University of New York Press. ISBN 0-87395-263-4.
- Kedar, Benjamin Z.; Mayer, Hans Eberhard; Smail, R. C., eds. (1982). Outremer: Studies in the history of the Crusading Kingdom of Jerusalem presented to Joshua Prawer. Jerusalem: Yad Izhak Ben-Zvi Institute. ISBN 978-965-217-010-1.
- La Monte, John L. La Monte (1932). Feudal Monarchy in the Latin Kingdom of Jerusalem, 1100–1291. Cambridge, Massachusetts: The Mediaeval Academy of America.
- Mayer, Hans Eberhard (1988) [1965]. The Crusades. Translated by Gillingham, John (2nd ed.). Oxford University Press.
- Mayer, Hans Eberhard (1978). "Latins, Muslims, and Greeks in the Latin Kingdom of Jerusalem". History. 63 (208). Wiley: 175–192. doi:10.1111/j.1468-229X.1978.tb02360.x. JSTOR i24408666.
- Mayer, Hans Eberhard (1994). Kings and Lords in the Latin Kingdom of Jerusalem. Ashgate Publishing. ISBN 0-86078-416-9.
- Pernoud, Régine (2003). The Crusaders: The Struggle for the Holy Land. San Francisco: Ignatius Press. ISBN 0-89870-949-0.
- Prawer, Joshua (1972). The Latin Kingdom of Jerusalem: European Colonialism in the Middle Ages. London: Weidenfeld and Nicolson.
- Prawer, Joshua (1980). Crusader Institutions. Oxford: Clarendon Press. ISBN 0-19-822536-9.
- Riley-Smith, Jonathan (1991). The First Crusade and the Idea of Crusading. Philadelphia: University of Pennsylvania. ISBN 0-8122-1363-7.
- Riley-Smith, Jonathan (2002). The Oxford History of the Crusades. Oxford: Oxford University Press. ISBN 0-19-280312-3.
- Tibbl, Stevene (1989). Monarchy and Lordships in the Latin Kingdom of Jerusalem, 1099–1291. Oxford: Clarendon Press. ISBN 978-0-19-822731-1.
- Tyerman, Christopher (2019). The World of the Crusades. New Haven: Yale University Press. p. 267. ISBN 978-0-300-21739-1.
- Verlinden, Charles (1970). The beginning of Modern Colonization. Ithaca: Cornell University Press.
- Jerusalem, Latin Kingdom of (1099–1291) – Article in the Catholic Encyclopedia
- Arteaga, Deborah L. (2012). Research on Old French: The State of the Art. Springer Science & Business Media. ISBN 978-94-007-4768-5.
- Prawer, Joshua; et al. (A History of the Crusades) (1985). "Social classes in the Crusader States: The 'Minorities". In Norman P. Zacour,Harry W. Hazard (ed.). The Impact of the Crusades on the Near East. Vol. V. Madison: University of Wisconsin Press.
- Kedar, Benjamin Z.; et al. (The Samaritans) (1989). Alan David Crown (ed.). Samaritan History: The Frankish Period. Tübingen: J. C. B. Mohr. ISBN 3-16-145237-2.
- Riley-Smith, John (1979). "The Title of Godfrey of Bouillon". Bulletin of the Institute of Historical Research. 52 (125). Oxford: Oxford University Press. doi:10.1111/j.1468-2281.1979.tb02085.x.
- Murray, Alan V. (1990). "The Title of Godfrey of Bouillon as Ruler of Jerusalem"". Collegium Medievale. 3 (2).
- Madden, Thomas F. (2006). The new Concise history of the Crusades. Lanham, Md.: Rowman & Littlefield. ISBN 0-74253-823-0.
- Phillips, Jonathan (2007). The Second Crusade: Extending the Frontiers of Christendom. New Haven: Yale University Press. ISBN 0-300-16475-0.
- Jotischky, Andrew (2014). Crusading and the Crusader States. Taylor and Francis. ISBN 978-1-317-87602-1.
- Baldwin, Marshall W.; et al. (A History of the Crusades) (1969). "The Decline and Fall of Jerusalem, 1174–1189". In Marshall W. Baldwin (ed.). The First Hundred Years. Vol. 1. Madison: University of Wisconsin Press.
- Edbury, Peter W.; et al. (Crusaders and Moslems in Twelfth-Century Syria) (1993). Maya Shatzmiller (ed.). Propaganda and faction in the Kingdom of Jerusalem: the background to Hattin. Leiden: Brill. ISBN 978-90-04-09777-3.
- Powell, James M. (1986). Anatomy of a Crusade: 1213–1221. University of Pennsylvania Press.
- Van Cleve, Thomas C.; et al. (A History of the Crusades) (1969). "The Fifth Crusade". In Robert Lee Wolff, Harry W. Hazard (ed.). The Later Crusades, 1189–1311. Vol. 2. Madison: University of Wisconsin Press.
- Lower, Michael (2005). The Barons' Crusade: A Call to Arms and its Consequences. University of Pennsylvania Press. ISBN 0-8122-3873-7.
- Ellenblum, Ronnie (1998). Frankish Rural Settlement in the Latin Kingdom of Jerusalem. Cambridge University Press. ISBN 0-521-55401-2.
- Riley-Smith, Jonathan (1972). "Some lesser officials in Latin Syria". English Historical Review. 87 (342).
- Russell, Josiah C.; et al. (A History Of The Crusades) (1985). "Population of the Crusader States". In Norman P. Zacour, Harry W. Hazard (ed.). The Impact of the Crusades on the Near East. Madison: The University of Wisconsin Press.
- Friedman, Yvonne (2002). Encounter between Enemies: Captivity and Ransom in the Latin Kingdom of Jerusalem. Leiden: Brill. ISBN 90-04-11706-7.
- Kedar, Benjamin Z. (1999). "On the origins of the earliest laws of Frankish Jerusalem: The canons of the Council of Nablus, 1120". Speculum. 74 (2). JSTOR 2887049.
- Nader, Marwan (2006). Burgesses and Burgess Law in the Latin Kingdoms of Jerusalem and Cyprus (1099–1325). Ashgate. ISBN 0-7546-5687-X.
- Bevan, Bryan (1994). Henry IV. London: Macmillan. ISBN 0-948695-35-8.
- Edbury, P. W.; Rowe, J. G. (1978). "William of Tyre and the Patriarchal election of 1180". The English Historical Review. 93 (366). JSTOR 565315.
- Riley-Smith, Jonathan (1973). The Feudal Nobility and the Kingdom of Jerusalem 1174-1277. Shoe String Press. ISBN 0-208-01348-2.
- McLynn, Frank (2007). Richard and John: Kings at War. Da Capo Press. ISBN 0-30681-579-6.
- Michaud, Joseph Francois (2023). The History of the Crusades. Vol. 3. Legare Street Press. ISBN 102281026X.
- Harris, William (2012). Lebanon: A History, 600–2011. Oxford: Oxford University Press. ISBN 978-0-19-518112-8.
