= John of Ibelin =

John of Ibelin may refer to:

- John of Ibelin, Old Lord of Beirut (1179–1236), constable of Jerusalem, regent of the kingdoms of Jerusalem and Cyprus, opponent of Frederick II, Holy Roman Emperor
- John II of Beirut (died 1264), grandson of the "Old Lord of Beirut"
- John of Arsuf (c. 1211–1258), constable of Jerusalem
- John of Ibelin (jurist) (1215–1266), count of Jaffa and Ascalon, bailli of Cyprus, and author of the Assizes of the Haute Cour of Jerusalem
- John of Ibelin (1277–1309), Lord of Arsuf, grandson of John of Arsuf
