= Officers of the Kingdom of Jerusalem =

Coat of arms of the kingdom of Jerusalem.

There were six major officers of the Kingdom of Jerusalem: the constable, the marshal, the seneschal, the chamberlain (which were known as the "Grand Offices"), the butler and the chancellor. At certain times there were also bailiffs, viscounts and castellans.

Essentially these offices developed from the typical officials that existed in northern France in the 11th century, the homeland of the first kings of Jerusalem. The offices continued to develop in France and England, but in Jerusalem they tended to develop more slowly or not at all, taking on different roles than their European counterparts.

The lists given below are incomplete, as the specific names and dates of the officers are sometimes unknown. After the fall of the Kingdom of Jerusalem, the offices were sometimes awarded as honors by the kings of Cyprus and Jerusalem.

== Constable ==
The constable commanded the army, paid mercenaries and judged legal cases pertaining to the military. He was the most important officer in the kingdom, due to the almost constant state of warfare that existed between the Christian and Muslim states. The constable was officially the second-in-command of the army, in which he exercised police authority and commanded a division twice as large as all others. In addition, constables also determined the boundaries and borders of the kingdom. During the coronation the constable would hold the king's horse.

- Simon (1108–1115)
- Hugh Caulis (c. 1120)
- Eustace Grenier (c. 1123-1123)
- William I of Bures (1123–1141?)
- Manasses of Hierges (1144–1151)
- Humphrey II of Toron (1152–1179)
- Aimery of Lusignan (1179–1194)
- John of Ibelin (1194–1205)
- Walter of Montbéliard (1206–1211)
- Odo of Montbéliard (1220–1244)
- Philip of Montfort (c. 1244)
- John of Ibelin (1251–1258)
- William of Botron (1258–1262)
- Balian of Arsuf (1268–1277)
- Richard of Neublans (c. 1277)
- Simon of Montolif (c. 1284?)
- Baldwin of Ibelin (c. 1286)
- Amalric of Lusignan (1285–1300)
- Philip of Brunswick-Grubenhagen (c. 1359?)
- Peter of Lusignan (c. 1415?)

== Marshal ==
The marshal was next-in-command (and, apparently, a literal vassal) to the constable. He led the mercenaries and was in charge of the army's horses, and distributed the spoils of a victorious battle. On coronation day the marshal would assist the constable.

- Sado (1125–1154)
- Odo of Saint-Amand (1155–1156)
- Joscelin III of Edessa (1156–1159)
- William (1159–1171)
- Gerard of Pugi (1169–1174)
- John (c. 1179)
- Gerard of Ridefort (c. 1179)
- Walter Durus (1185–1192)
- Hugh Martin (c. 1191)
- Arnulf (c. 1193)
- John (1194–1200)
- Aymar de Lairon (c. 1206)
- James of Dournai (1211–1217)
- Riccardo Filangieri (1231–1242)
- Philip of Cossie (c. 1250)
- Geoffrey of Sergines (c. 1254)
- John of Gibelet (1261–1262)
- William Canet (1269–1273)
- James Vidal (c. 1277)

== Seneschal ==
The office of seneschal in Jerusalem never achieved the prominence of its European counterparts but was important nonetheless. The seneschal administered the coronation ceremony, oversaw the High Court in the king's absence, administered royal castles, and managed the royal finances and revenue. The seneschal's power was over only viscounts and not castellans, and the constable was still superior to the seneschal due in part to the kingdom's constant state of war. During coronations the seneschal would hold the royal sceptre and oversee the coronation feast.

The office was similar to, but not as developed as, the English office of the exchequer.

- Hugh of St. Omer (c. 1100–1104)
- Gervase of Bazoches (c. 1104)
- Hugo Chostard (c. 1112)
- Anscherius (c. 1122?)
- Isaac (c. 1149)
- John (c. 1151)
- Guy of Milly (c. 1164)
- Miles of Plancy (c. 1168–1174)
- Ralph (c. 1176)
- Joscelin III of Edessa (1176–1190)
- Obertus Nepos (1187–1192?), possibly only personal under Conrad of Montferrat
- Ralph of Tiberias (1194–1220)
- Raymond of Gibelet (c. 1240)
- Baldwin of Ibelin (c. 1256)
- Geoffrey of Sergines (1254–1267?)
- Robert of Cresque (c. 1269)
- Olivier de Termes (1269)
- Jean I de Grailly (1272–1276)
- Odo Poilechien (1278–1286)
- Philip of Ibelin (?–?)

== Chamberlain ==
The chamberlain administered the royal household and its servants, and had other honorary duties such as administering oaths. On coronation day the chamberlain would robe the king. He had his own fief from which he drew his salary.

- Strabulon (c. 1099)
- Geoffrey (c. 1099)
- Gerard (1108–1115)
- John (1119–1128)
- Ralph (1129–1130)
- Joscelin (c. 1138)
- Miles (c. 1138)
- Nicholas (1150–1152)
- Gauvain de la Roche (c. 1156)
- Gerard of Pugi (c. 1169)
- Aimery of Lusignan (1175–1178)
- John (c. 1179)
- Raymond (c. 1184)
- Balian of Ibelin (1183–1185)
- Thomas (1190–1197)
- Henry of Canelli (c. 1192)
- John (c. 1194)
- Rohard of Caiphas (1201–1220)
- Renaud of Caiphas (1230–1232)
- John of Cossie (1232–1250)
- Philip of Cossie (1250–1269)

== Butler ==
The butler was in charge of the royal table and also administered the kingdom's vineyards.

- Winric (c. 1099)
- Gervais (c. 1107)
- Pagan (1120–1136)
- Robert Crispin (1145–1146)
- Odo of St Amand (1164–1167)
- Miles (1185–1186)

== Chancellor ==
The chancellor drew up deeds and charters and managed the kingdom's diplomatic service. The chancellery is an interesting example of the fossilization of 11th century offices. It consisted of only a few secretaries and scribes, and never became the large administrative bureaucracy that had developed elsewhere in Europe. Chancellors tended to be clergymen who often became bishops or archbishops, sometimes while still holding the chancellery. The relative unimportance of the chancellor reflects the relative decentralization of royal authority as compared to states like France or England that were at the same time becoming more centralized.

- Arnoul (?–?)
- Pagan (1115–1128)
- Amelinus (c. 1130)
- Franco (1133–1135?)
- Elias (1136–1142)
- Ralph, bishop of Bethlehem (1146–1174)
- Frederick, Archbishop of Tyre (c. 1150)
- William, archbishop of Tyre (1174–1183)
- Lambert (c. 1177)
- Bandinus (for Conrad of Montferrat (de jure Conrad I from 1190), in Tyre) (1188–1192)
- Peter, bishop of Tripoli (1185–1192)
- Odo (c. 1190)
- Joscius, Archbishop of Tyre (1192–1200)
- Ralph of Mérencourt (1206–1215)
- Simon of Maugastel (1226–1227)
- Maregnan (c. 1234)
- Walter of Ocra (1254–1259)

== Bailiff ==
The bailiff (or bailli) administered the kingdom in the absence or minority of the king, in the capacity of a regent; for example, during the captivity of Baldwin II, and the youth and illness of Baldwin IV. In the 13th century the bailiff ruled essentially as a king himself, and was the most powerful man in the kingdom, as the kings were usually foreign monarchs who did not live permanently in the kingdom.

- Eustace Grenier (1123)
- William I of Bures (1123–1124)
- Miles of Plancy (1173)
- Raymond III of Tripoli (1173–1177)
- Raynald of Châtillon (1177)
- Guy of Lusignan (1183–1185)
- Raymond III of Tripoli (1186)
- John of Ibelin (1206–1210)
- Odo of Montbéliard (1223–1227)
- Thomas of Aquino (1227–1228)
  - Richard Filangieri (1231–1242), at Tyre
  - Odo of Montbéliard (1236–1240), at Acre
  - Walter Penenpié (1240), at Acre
- John of Ibelin (1246–1248)
- Jean Fuinon (1248–1249)
- John of Arsuf (1249–1254)
- John of Ibelin (1254–1256)
- John of Arsuf (1256–1258)
- Geoffrey of Sergines (1259–1261)
- Balian of Ibelin (1276–1277)
- Roger of San Severino (1277–1281)
- Odo Poilechien (1281–1286)
- Baldwin of Ibelin (1286–1287)

== Viscount and castellan ==
These two offices were sometimes held by one person and sometimes held by two separate people; sometimes one or the other was not held at all. They were named by the king and occupied the Tower of David, but their specific duties are mostly unknown and were probably not particularly important; one of the duties of the viscount was apprehending criminals and administering justice in the lower-class burgess court. Like the office of butler, these offices may not have survived the move to Acre.

- Geoffrey (castellan, c. 1103)
- Anselm (castellan, c. 1110)
- Pisellus (viscount, c. 1110)
- Anscatinus (viscount, 1120–1135?)
- Rohard the Elder (both?, 1135?–1150?)
- Arnoul (viscount, 1155–1181?)
- Odo of St Amand (both?, c. 1160)
- Rohard of Jaffa (castellan, 1165–1177?)
- Peter of Creseto (castellan, c. 1173?)
- Balian of Jaffa (castellan, c. 1178)
- Peter of Creseto (castellan, c. 1178)

== See also ==
- Vassals of the Kingdom of Jerusalem
- Officers of the Kingdom of Cyprus
- Officers of the Principality of Antioch
- Officers of the County of Tripoli
- Officers of the County of Edessa

== Bibliography ==
- Charles du Fresne, sieur du Cange, Les Familles d'Outremer, ed. M.E-G. Rey, Paris, 1869.
- John L. La Monte, Feudal Monarchy in the Latin Kingdom of Jerusalem, 1100–1291. Cambridge, Massachusetts, 1932. Cf. pp. 252–60.
- Hans E. Mayer, The Crusades. Oxford University Press, 1965 (trans. 1972).
- Joshua Prawer, The Latin Kingdom of Jerusalem. Winfield and Nicholson, 1972.
- Jean Richard. (1979). The Latin Kingdom of Jerusalem. North-Holland: New York. ISBN 0-444-85092-9.
- Jonathan Riley-Smith, The Feudal Nobility in the Kingdom of Jerusalem, 1174–1277, Archon Books, London,1973.
- Steven Tibble, Monarchy and Lordship in the Latin Kingdom of Jerusalem, 1099–1291, Clarendon Press, 1989.
