= Roger of San Severino =

13th-century bailiff of Jerusalem

Roger of San Severino was the bailiff of the Kingdom of Jerusalem from 1277 to 1282. He was sent to Acre, then the capital of the kingdom, with a small force by the new king Charles I of Anjou, also King of Sicily, to act as regent.

Charles, an Angevin and brother of King Louis IX of France, had purchased the rights to the kingdom from Mary of Antioch, one of the claimants after the death of Conradin in 1268. The succession, however, was disputed between Mary and Hugh III of Cyprus.

Roger had the support of the Knights Templar and the Republic of Venice when he landed at Acre. The bailiff at the time was Balian of Ibelin, Lord of Arsuf, who initially refused to admit him into the citadel until papers signed by Charles, Mary, and Pope John XXI were produced and the Knights Hospitallers and Patriarch of Jerusalem John of Vercelli had refused to intervene. The state of the kingdom became anarchy as Roger raised Charles' standards and demanded oaths of homage from the barons, who in turn refused to accept the transferral of the royal rights without a decision of the Haute Cour. The barons requested Hugh of Cyprus to release them from their oaths, but he refused. Roger then threatened all the barons with confiscation if they did not do him homage. They did. Even Bohemond VII of Tripoli recognised him as regent in Acre.

Roger governed the remnant of the Latin kingdom in the East in peace. He continued the alliance with the Mamluk sultan of Egypt, Qalawun, at the request of Charles and extended it for another ten years in May 1281. He also refused to aid the Mongol ilkhan of Persia, Abaqa, against the Mamluks at the Second Battle of Homs. He even personally congratulated Qalawun on his victory. In 1281, following the Sicilian Vespers of 30 March, Roger was recalled with his troops to Italy and he left Odo Poilechien behind as his deputy.

== See also ==
- House of Sanseverino

== Sources ==
- Setton, Kenneth M.; Wolff, Robert Lee; Hazard, Harry W., eds. (1969) [1962]. A History of the Crusades, Volume II: The Later Crusades, 1189–1311. Vol. 2 (Second ed.). Madison, Milwaukee, and London: University of Wisconsin Press. ISBN 0-299-04844-6.
