= Balian of Arsuf =

Balian

Lord of Arsuf
- Reign: 1258–1277 (titular after 1261)
- Born: 1239
- Died: 29 September 1277 (aged 37–38)
- Noble family: House of Ibelin
- Spouse: Plaisance of Antioch
- Issue: John, titular Lord of Arsuf; Jeanne; Nicole; Ermeline
- Father: John, Lord of Arsuf
- Mother: Alice, daughter of Rohard of Haifa

Balian of Ibelin (1239 – 29 September 1277) was the Lord of Arsuf from 1258 until the early 1260s (probably 1261), when he leased it to the Knights Hospitaller. He was the son and successor of John, Lord of Arsuf and Constable of Jerusalem. At the time when he leased/rented it to the hospital, his fief of Arsuf was worth six knights' fees and twenty sergeants'; the Hospital took up his obligations with the exception of the servise de cors.

He was married to Plaisance of Antioch from 1254 until their divorce in 1258, after which he moved from Antioch to Tripoli. He was created Constable of Jerusalem like his father had been in 1268 and held that post until his death. Hugh III of Cyprus and Jerusalem appointed Balian bailiff, effectively regent, of the kingdom upon returning to Cyprus in October 1276. Hugh's claim to the royal title, however, was disputed by Charles I of Naples, who sent Roger of Sanseverino to Acre as his bailiff in 1277.

Balian initially refused to admit Roger into the citadel until papers signed by Charles, Mary of Antioch, and Pope John XXI were produced and the Knights Hospitallers and John of Vercelli, Patriarch of Jerusalem, had refused to intervene. To avoid war, he allowed Roger in and Charles was proclaimed king.

He died on 29 September 1277, the day being known from a single copy of the Annales de Terre Sainte. He was succeeded by his son John, titular Lord of Arsuf (1277–1309), who married Isabella of Ibelin, daughter of Balian seneschal of Cyprus.
