= John of Arsuf =

Constable of Jerusalem

John
- Constable of Jerusalem
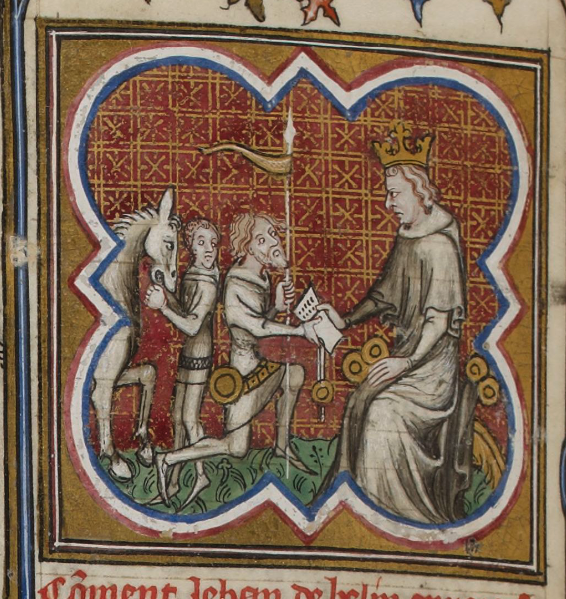
- Illustration of John (centre) delivering his 1241 letter to Frederick II

Lord of Arsuf
- Reign: 1231–1258
- Successor: Balian of Arsuf
- Born: c. 1211
- Died: 1258
- Noble family: House of Ibelin-Arsuf
- Spouses: Alice, daughter of Rohard of Haifa
- Issue: Balian of Arsuf
- Father: John of Ibelin, the Old Lord of Beirut
- Mother: Melisende of Arsuf

John of Ibelin (French: Jean d'Ibelin; c. 1211 – 1258), commonly called John of Arsuf (Jean d'Arsouf), was the lord of Arsuf from 1236 and Constable of Jerusalem from 1251. He was a younger son of John I of Beirut. His elder brother, Balian, inherited Beirut. He served as regent of Jerusalem on two occasions: 1253–1254 for Conrad II and 1256–1258 for Conrad III. He was lieutenant for the regent on three occasions: 1247–1248 and 1249–1252 for Henry I of Cyprus and 1258 for Plaisance of Antioch.

Aerial view of the remains of the Crusader castle at Arsuf

John strengthened the existing fortifications of Arsuf in 1241. In that year, he co-signed a letter with his cousin, Philip of Montfort, and Geoffrey of Estraing to the Holy Roman Emperor Frederick II, nominal regent of Jerusalem. The letter, which had been encouraged by Richard of Cornwall, proposed that Frederick pardon all baronial rebels and make Simon de Montfort, Earl of Leicester, bailiff. The barons would in turn swear oaths to Simon and recognize his authority until King Conrad II, came of age (1243). It was refused.

John, like his father, was learned in law and he re-used some of the legal arguments which his father had employed in his long career. In February 1251, shortly after becoming the lieutenant (bailli) of Jerusalem on behalf of the regent Henry of Cyprus, John called a council of liegemen in the palace of his relatives, the lords of Beirut, in Acre. There he proposed that the courts employ scribes to keep written records in the French language and that the High Court of Jerusalem should do the same, sealing their records in a locked chest, the keys to which were to be held by the regent or his lieutenant and two elected liegemen. These reforms were accepted by the barons. The reform of the burgess court was enacted by 1269, but the reform of the High Court was put off until 1286.

While the Seventh Crusade drew Muslim soldiers away from Palestine, John led an expedition against Bethsan in early 1250. He devastated a nearby camp and captured 16,000 animals and one emir.

In 1252, John witnessed the creation of two new gates in the Hospitaller complex in Acre and the consequent creation of a new public road. In 1253, John succeeded Henry of Cyprus as regent for a few months until 1254, on behalf of the absentee king Conrad. In 1256, he was again appointed regent for the minor Conrad III.

In 1257, he confirmed a treaty with the city of Ancona, granting it commercial rights in Acre in return for aid of fifty men-at-arms for two years. Though Ancona was an ally of the Republic of Genoa and John sought by his treaty to bring the feudatories — most of whom were onside — to support Genoa against Venice in the War of Saint Sabas, his plan ultimately backfired and John of Jaffa and John II of Beirut engineered a coup to make Plaisance of Antioch, the estranged wife of John's son Balian, bailiff on behalf of the regent Hugh II of Cyprus. John accepted the coup and reconciled with Plaisance and Bohemond VI of Antioch. When Plaisance returned to Cyprus, he was again put in charge as lieutenant.

In 1258, he negotiated the treaty between the military orders, the Hospitallers, Templars, and Teutonic Knights, which regulated their relationship. Upon his death that same year, he was succeeded as constable by his lieutenant, Geoffrey of Sergines, appointed by Plaisance. He had married Alice, daughter of Rohard of Haifa, at an unknown date prior to his death. His son and successor in Arsuf was Balian.
