= Fall of Outremer =

History of the Kingdom of Jerusalem, 1272–1302

- Part of the Crusades
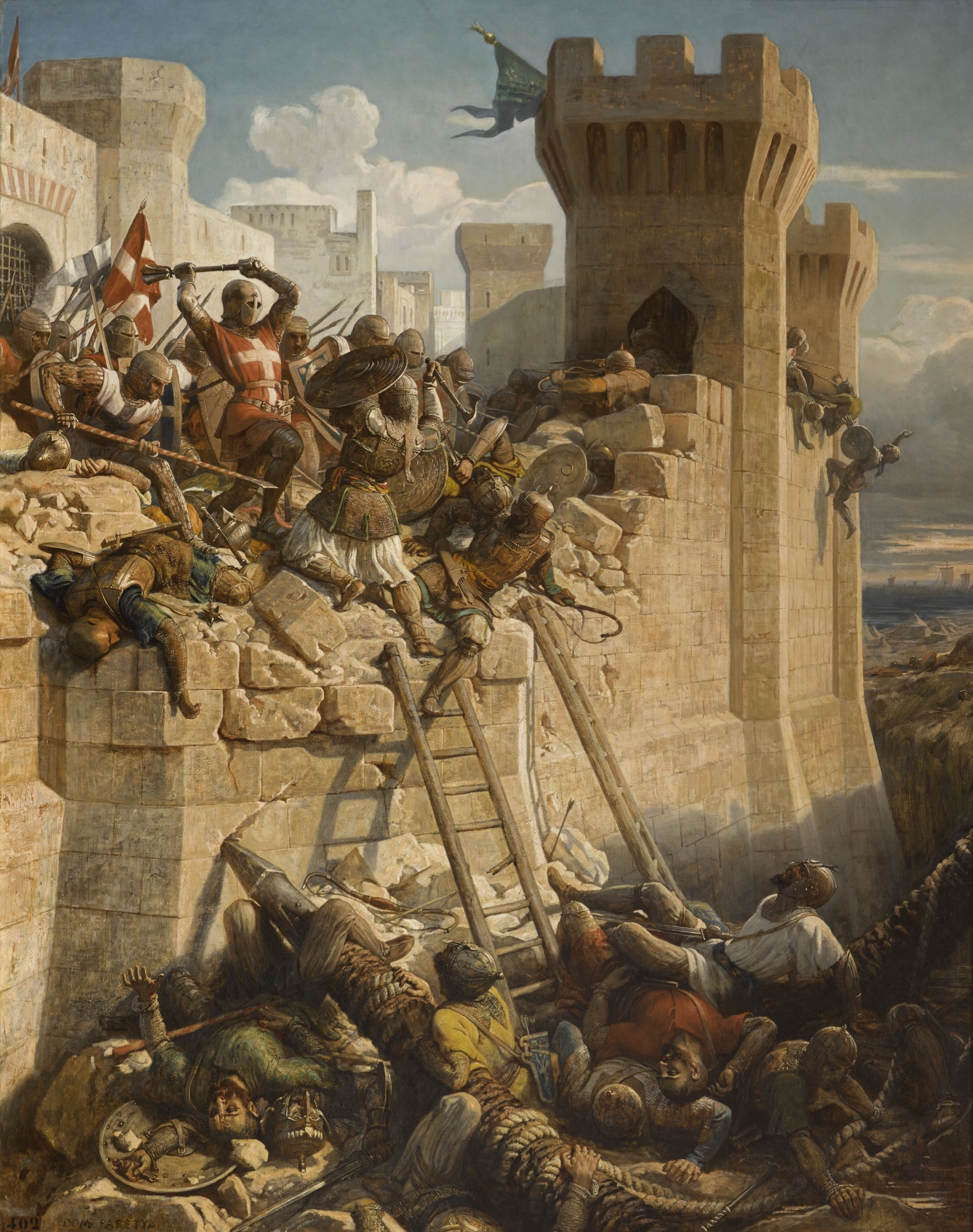
- The Siege of Acre (1291), Dominique Papety (1815–49)
Date	1272–1302
Location	Levant
Result	Mamluk victory; End of the Crusades in the Levant
Territorial changes	The Egyptians capture all Crusade possessions in the Holy Land

Belligerents
Kingdom of Jerusalem; Hugh III; John I Henry II; France; Philip III; Philip IV; England; Edward I Edward II; Kingdom of Sicily; Charles I of Anjou; Peter III of Aragon; Frederick III of Sicily; James II of Aragon; Military Orders; Templars; Hospitallers; Teutonic Knights	Mamluk Sultanate; Al-Malik Baibars; Al-Said Barakah; Badr al-Din Solamish; Al-Mansûr Qalawun; Al-Ashraf Khalil; An-Nasir Muhammad; Kitbugha; Lajin; Other/Unaffiliated; Assassins; Byzantine Empire; Michael VIII Palaiologos; Andronikos II Palaiologos; Michael IX Palaiologos; Galilee; Antioch; Tyre; Allies; Mongol Ilkhanate; Kingdom of Armenia; Georgian Bagratids

Commanders and leaders
Western Forces; Roger of San Severino; Balian of Arsuf; Barthélémy de Maraclée; Geoffrey of Langley; Bohemond VII of Tripoli; Lucia of Tripoli; Narjot de Toucy; John of Montfort; Benedetto I Zaccaria; Amalric of Tyre; Jean I de Grailly; Otto de Grandson; Peter Embriaco; Barthélemy de Quincy; Guy of Ibelin; Jean II de Giblet Hospitallers/Templars; Thomas Bérard; Guillaume de Beaujeu; Thibaud Gaudin; Jacques de Molay; Geoffroi de Charney; Hugues de Revel; Nicolas Lorgne; Jacques de Taxi; Joseph of Chauncy; Jean de Villiers; Matthew of Clermont; Peter of Moncada; Guillaume de Villaret; Foulques de Villaret	Mamluks; Baibars; Qalawun; Sunqur al-Ashqar; Al-Mansur II Muhammad; Khalil; An-Nasir Muhammad Other Players; James I of Aragon; Maria of Antioch; Rudolph I of Hapsburg; Charles II of Naples; Eschive of Ibelin; Leo II of Armenia; Hethum II of Armenia; Demetrius II of Georgia; Vakhtang II of Georgia; David VIII of Georgia; Burchard of Schwanden; Conrad of Feuchtwangen Mongols; Abaqa; Möngke Temur; Taghachar; Arghun; Gaykhatu; Baydu; Ghazan; Kutlushah; Mulay; Öljaitü

Strength
Unknown	Unknown

Casualties and losses
Unknown	Unknown

The Fall of Outremer describes the history of the Kingdom of Jerusalem from the end of the last European Crusade to the Holy Land in 1272 until the final loss in 1302. The kingdom was the center of Outremer—the four Crusader states—which formed after the First Crusade in 1099 and reached its peak in 1187. The loss of Jerusalem in that year began the century-long decline. The years 1272–1302 were fraught with many conflicts throughout the Levant as well as the Mediterranean and Western European regions, and many Crusades were proposed to free the Holy Land from Egyptian Mamluk control. The major players fighting the Muslims included the kings of England and France, the kingdoms of Cyprus and Sicily, the three Military Orders and Mongol Ilkhanate. Traditionally, the end of Western European presence in the Holy Land is identified as their defeat at the Siege of Acre in 1291, but the Christian forces managed to hold on to the small island fortress of Ruad until 1302.

The Holy Land would no longer be the focus of the West even though various crusades were proposed in the early years of the fourteenth century. The Knights Hospitaller would conquer Rhodes from Byzantium, making it the center of their activity for two hundred years. The Mamluk sultanate would continue for another century.

== The last Crusades ==
The Eighth Crusade ended badly in 1270 and freed the Mamluks to continue to ravage Syria and Palestine. The Frankish fortresses soon fell, and the last major expedition, Lord Edward's Crusade, ended in 1272 and failed to free Jerusalem. There would be at least two planned crusades over the next decade but none that came to fruition, and two more planned before the final expulsion of the Franks from Syria in 1291. At the Second Council of Lyon in 1274, Gregory X, who had accompanied Edward I of England to the Holy Land, preached a new crusade to an assembly which included envoys from both the Byzantine emperor Michael VIII Paliollogos and the Mongol Ilkhan Abaqa, as well as from the princes of the West. Many among the Western nobles took the cross. Gregory was successful in temporarily uniting the churches of Rome and Constantinople, and in securing Byzantine support for his new crusade, which reflected a general alarm at the plans of Charles I of Anjou. On 10 January 1276, Gregory X died and there was to be no crusade. Charles was able to resume his plans. In 1277, Maria of Antioch sold her claims to Charles who was then able to establish a presence in Acre, under the regency of Roger of San Severino. In 1278, he took possession of the Principality of Achaea. With these bases, he prepared for a new crusade, to be directed against Constantinople. His plans were disrupted by the War of the Sicilian Vespers and the coronation of Peter III of Aragon as king of Sicily which occupied him until his death in 1285. This was the last serious attempt at a crusade on behalf of the kingdom for two decades.

=== Baibars and the Assassins ===
During the Eighth Crusade in Tunis, Mamluk sultan Baibars expected that he would have to defend Egypt against Louis IX of France. In order to weaken the Frankish position, he arranged for the assassination of a leading baron, the Lord of Tyre, Philip of Montfort. The Assassins in Syria had thrived despite the successful Mongol campaign against the Nizaris in Persia. They owed much to the sultan, who freed them from paying tribute to the Knights Hospitaller, and resented the Frankish negotiations with the Mongol Ilkhanate. At the behest of Baibars, the Assassins sent one of their operatives to Tyre. On 17 August 1270, pretending to be a Christian convert, the would-be assassin entered the chapel where Philip and his son John of Montfort were praying. Philip was mortally wounded, surviving long enough to learn that his heir was safe. His death was a heavy blow to the Franks as John lacked his father's experience and prestige.

The death of Louis IX on 25 August 1270 relieved Baibars of the obligation to assist Tunisian caliph Muhammad I al-Mustansir. In February 1271, he marched into Frankish territory towards the settlement of Safita where the Chastel Blanc stood, a major fortress of the Knights Templar. The Mamluk attack was briefly repelled but the garrison was ordered to surrender by Grand Master Thomas Bérard, and the defenders were allowed to retire to Tortosa. On 3 March 1271, Baibars marched on the huge Hospitaller fortress of Krak des Chevaliers. He was joined by contingents of the Syrian Assassins and the army of al-Mansur II Muhammad, emir of Hama. The Mamluks conveyed a forged letter from Grand Master Hugues de Revel directing the surrender of the garrison and on 8 April they capitulated and were allowed to travel to Tripoli. Krak des Chevaliers had defied even Saladin and it gave Baibars effective control of the approaches to Tripoli. He followed it up with the capture of Gibelacar Castle, falling on 1 May 1271.

Later in 1271, two Assassins were sent by Bohemond VI of Antioch to murder Baibars. The Isma'ili leaders that ordered the assassination were caught and agreed to surrender their castles and live at Baibars' court. Bohemond did not wish for Tripoli the same fate as Antioch and so he proposed a truce to Baibars. The sultan, sensing a lack of courage, demanded that he should pay all the expenses of his recent campaign. Bohemond refused the insulting terms, and Baibars then attacked the small fortress at Maraclea, built on a rock off the coast between Baniyas and Tortosa. Barthélémy de Maraclée, a vassal of Bohemond, fled the attack and took refuge in Persia at the court of Abaqa, where he pleaded with the Mongol Ilkhan to intervene in the Holy Land. Baibars was so furious at this attempt to bring his old nemesis into the equation that he directed the Assassins to murder Barthélémy.

In May 1271, Baibars offered Bohemond a truce for ten years, satisfied with his recent conquests. Bohemond accepted and the sultan returned to Egypt, pausing only to take Montfort Castle, belonging to the Teutonic Knights since 1220. The castle, first besieged in 1266, surrendered on 12 June after one week's siege and was demolished shortly thereafter. All the inland Frankish castles had now been captured. Baibars then sent a squadron of ships to attack Cyprus, having heard that Hugh III of Cyprus had left for Acre. His fleet appeared off of Limassol, but ran aground and its sailors were captured by the Cypriots.

=== Edward I of England ===
Edward I of England had attempted to join Louis IX on the Eighth Crusade, but arrived in North Africa after the Treaty of Tunis had been signed. That treaty marked the end of the Louis' last expedition in 1270, freeing up troops that Baibars had planned to send into the theater. Edward proceeded on to the Holy Land to confront the Mamluks, beginning his Crusades, the last from the West.

Early in 1272, Edward realized his expedition was futile, lacking in both manpower and allies. He decided to seek a truce that would preserve Frankish Outremer, at least temporarily. Baibars was ready for a truce as the remnants of the Frankish kingdom could then be attacked once the English had left. His major enemies were the Mongols and he needed to secure on that front before his assaults on the last of the Frankish fortresses. To prevent Western intervention, he need to maintain good relations with Charles I of Anjou, the only one who might bring effective help to Acre. Charles' main ambition was Constantinople, with Syria of secondary interest. He did have ambitions of adding Outremer to his empire and so wanted wished to preserve its existence but not by supporting Hugh III of Cyprus, then king of Jerusalem. He was willing to mediate between Baibars and Edward and on 22 May 1272, a treaty was signed between the sultan and Acre at Caesarea, under Mamluk control since 1265. The kingdom's possessions were guaranteed for ten years and ten months, primarily the narrow coastal plain from Acre to Sidon, plus the unhindered use of the road to Nazareth frequented by pilgrims. Tripoli was safeguarded by the truce that followed the Siege of Tripoli in 1271.

Edward wished to return to the Holy Land leading a greater crusade, and so, despite their truce, Baibars decided to have him assassinated. On 16 June 1272, an Assassin disguised as a native Christian penetrated into Edward's chamber, stabbing him with a poisoned dagger. Edward survived, but was seriously ill for months. After he had recovered, Edward prepared to sail for home. His father was dying, his own health was bad and there was nothing remaining to do. He left Acre on 22 September 1272, and returned to England to find himself king.

=== Gregory X and the Aftermath of the Crusades ===
Teobaldo Visconti, the archdeacon of Liege, was with Edward I on his Crusade when he received the news that he had been elected pope, taking the name Gregory X. As pope, one of his missions was to see how the crusading spirit could be revived with the goal of recovery of the Holy Land. His appeals for soldiers to take the cross and fight against the Muslims were circulated throughout Christendom, with limited response. As time went on, he received reports that were disturbing and would explain the hostility of public opinion towards the cause. Crusades were viewed as an instrument of an aggressive papal policy. Spiritual rewards were promised to men who would fight against the Greeks, the Albigensians and the Hohenstaufen, and so the fight against the Muslims in a Holy War was just one of many. Even loyal supporters saw no reason for making a long and uncomfortable journey to the Holy Land when there were so many opportunities of gaining holy merit in less exacting campaigns.

Gregory had convoked the fourteenth ecumenical council of the Church on 31 March 1272, wanting to discuss reunion of the Church with the Greeks, a new crusade, and Church reform. He issued the papal bull Dudum super generalis on 11 March 1273, asking for information on all the infidels that threatened Christendom. Among the many reports that he received were ones that pointed the blame for failure at the policies of papacy. Criticism of crusading, a minor occurrence after the earlier Crusades, was sparked anew after the failure of the later Crusades, generally describing needed changes for a successful expedition to the East. They were nevertheless reflected continued interest in and support for the crusading movement. Notable examples included the following:

- Guibert of Tournai, a French Franciscan, wrote his Collectio de Scandalis Ecclesiae describing of the harm done to the Crusades by the quarrels of the kings and nobility. The main themes were the corruption of the clergy and the abuse of indulgences, with agents raising money by the redemption of Crusading vows. The clergy would not contribute to pay for the Crusades, even though Louis IX had refused them exemption. Yet the general public was taxed again and again for Crusades that never took place.
- Bruno von Schauenburg, the bishop of Olmutz, wrote a report that spoke of scandals in the Church and called for a strong emperor, namely his benefactor, Ottokar II of Bohemia. Crusades to the East were now pointless and should instead be directed against the heathens on the eastern frontiers of the Empire. The Teutonic Knights were mishandling this work and, if it were directed by a suitable leader, it would provide financial as well as religious advantages.
- William of Tripoli, a Dominican from Acre, wrote a more constructive memoir. He had little hopes for a Holy War in the East conducted from Europe, but he believed the prophecies that the end of Islam was close, to be destroyed by the Mongols. As a member of a preaching order he had faith in the power of sermons and it was his conviction that the East would be won by missionaries, not by soldiers. His opinion was supported by the theology of philosopher Roger Bacon.
- Humbert of Romans, the fifth Master General of the Order of Preachers, provided a complete report in his Opus Tripartitum. This was written in anticipation of an ecumenical council which would discuss the crusade, the East-West Schism and Church reform. He did not believe that it was possible to convert the Muslims but thought the conversion of the Jews was a divine promise and that of the East European pagans could also be converted. He proposed that another crusade in the Holy Land was both feasible and essential to the Christian cause. He believed that vice and cowardice kept men from sailing eastward, and the love of their homelands and feminine influences anchored them at home. According to Humbert, few believed in the spiritual merit that was promised to the crusader. Clerical reform may be of some help, but the reform of public sentiment was impractical and his recommendations for the execution of a crusade were valueless. In the area of finance, he implied that papal methods of extortion had not always been popular, clearly an understatement. He believed that if the Church and the princes were to sell some of their treasures, it would have positive psychological as well as material results.

=== The Second Council of Lyon ===
The Second Council of Lyon convened the next year to consider three major themes: (1) union with the Greeks, (2) the crusade, and (3) the reform of the church. Its sessions opened in May 1274. There was good participation, including by Paul of Segni, then bishop of Tripoli, and Guillaume de Beaujeu, recently elected grand master. But the kings of Christendom were notably absent. Philip III of France and Edward I of England, now king, declined to attend. James I of Aragon appeared and was eager to set out on another adventure, but he was soon bored and returned home. Delegates from emperor Michael VIII Paliollogos made an empty promise towards the submission of the Patriarchate of Constantinople as the emperor feared the ambition of Charles I of Anjou. The ambassadors of Abaqa, Ilkhan of the Mongols, also attended. Thomas Aquinas had been summoned to the council, but died en route. Bonaventure was present at the first four sessions, but died at Lyon on 15 July 1274. As at the First Council of Lyon, Thomas Cantilupe was an English attendee and a papal chaplain. Nothing of any value was achieved for the reform of the Church. The delegates were ready to talk about the crusades, particularly the recovery of the Holy Land, but none came forward with realistic offers of help that would be necessary to launch it.

In 1273, Gregory had prepared for the union of the churches by sending an embassy to Constantinople, and by inducing Charles I of Anjou and Philip I of Courtenay, Latin Emperor in exile, to moderate their political ambitions. Among those arriving at Lyons were Germanus III, George Akropolites and other dignitaries represent Byzantium. Their letter from the emperor had been endorsed by fifty archbishops and five hundred bishops. On 29 June 1274 at the Feast of Saints Peter and Paul, Gregory celebrated Mass in the Church of St. John. On 6 July, after a sermon by Pierre de Tarentaise and the public reading of the letter from the emperor, the Byzantines pledged fidelity to Rome and promised protection of Christians in the Holy Land. In response, Gregory wrote letters of encouragement to the emperor, his son Andronikos II Palaiologos, and forty-one metropolitans. Letters in response indicated that George Akropolites' assurances of fidelity had not been expressly authorized by the emperor.

=== The Crusade of Gregory X and the Mongols ===
Gregory X was the first pope to combine plans for a general crusade––a passagium generale––with plans for smaller interventions, called a "dual crusading policy". The council followed Gregory's lead and drew up plans for a crusade to recover the Holy Land, to be financed by a tithe imposed for six years on all the benefices of Christendom. The plans were approved but nothing concrete was done. James I of Aragon wished to organize the expedition at once, an idea that was opposed by the Templars. Fidentius of Padua, who had experience in the Holy Land, was commissioned by the pope to write a report on the recovery of the Holy Land.

The delegation of Mongols created a great stir, particularly when their leader underwent a public baptism. Among this delegation were the English Dominican David of Ashby and the clerk Rychaldus, and their objective was to conclude an alliance with the Christians. Rychaldus delivered a report to the council, outlining previous European-Ilkhanid relations under Abaqa's father Hulagu. There, after welcoming the Christian ambassadors to his court, Hulagu had agreed to exempt Latin Christians from taxes and charges in exchange for their prayers for the Khagan. Hulagu had also prohibited the molestation of Frankish establishments, and had committed to return Jerusalem to the Franks. Rychaldus told the assembly that Abaqa was still determined to drive the Mamluks from Syria and, at the bequest of the pope, would leave Christians in peace during their war against Islam.

At the council, Gregory promulgated a new crusade to start in 1278 in conjunction with the Mongols. He outlined a significant program to launch the crusade, which was documented in his Constitutions for the Zeal of the Faith. This text put forward four main milestones to accomplish the Crusade: (1) the imposition of a new tax over three years; (2) the interdiction of any kind of trade with the Muslims; (3) the supply of ships by the Italian maritime republics; and (4) the alliance of the West with Byzantium and the Ilkhanate. Despite the papal plans, there was little support from European monarchs who were reluctant to commit troops and resources. Gregory persevered, seeking to force the Western rulers carry out the pious resolutions of by the council. In 1275, Philip III of France took the Cross, followed by Rudolph of Hapsburg, in return for the promise of a coronation by the pope at Rome.

Gregory began preparing the Holy Land for the arrival of the crusade, ordering that fortresses be repaired and mercenaries deployed. From his personal experience, there was nothing to be expected from the government of Hugh III of Cyprus. He was sympathetic to Maria of Antioch, encouraging her to sell her claims to the Jerusalem throne to Charles I of Anjou. The pope wished Charles to take an active interest in Outremer, not only for its own protection but also to divert him from his ambitions towards Byzantine. But all of the plans of Gregory X came to nothing. He died on 10 January 1276. No Crusade had left for the Holy Land, and none was likely to leave. The money that had been gathered was instead distributed in Italy.

=== Gregory's Successors through the Loss of Acre ===
Gregory X was followed by, in quick succession, Innocent V, Adrian V and John XXI. During John's eight-month papacy, he attempted to launch a crusade for the recovery of the Holy Land, pushed for a union with the Eastern church, and did what he could to maintain peace between the Christian nations. He also launched a mission to convert the Mongols, but he died before it could start. He was succeeded by Nicholas III, who had served as a powerful cardinal under his predecessors. In 1278, at the request of Abaga, Franciscan missionaries were dispatched by the new pope to preach the Gospel first in Persia and then in China. The realization of the pope's desire for the organization of a crusade was not possible given the distracted state of European politics.

Nicholas III died on 22 August 1280 and was succeeded by Martin IV. Dependent on Charles I of Anjou in nearly everything, the new pope appointed him to the position of Summus Senator of Rome. At the insistence of Charles, Martin excommunicated emperor Michael VIII Palaeologus on 18 October 1281, as he stood in the way of Charles's plans to restore the Latin Empire of Constantinople established in the aftermath of the Fourth Crusade and overthrown in 1261. This broke the tenuous union which had been reached between the Greek and the Latin Churches at Lyon, and further compromise was rendered impossible. In 1282, Charles lost control of the island of Sicily in the violent massacre known as the Sicilian Vespers. The Sicilians had elected Peter III of Aragon as their king and sought papal confirmation. This was denied although the pope reconfirmed Sicily as a vassal state of the papacy. Martin IV used all of his resources against the Aragonese in order to preserve Sicily for the House of Anjou. He excommunicated Peter III, declared his kingdom of Aragon forfeit, and ordered Aragonese Crusade, but it was all in vain.

Martin IV died in March 1285 and was succeeded by Honorius IV. Honorius inherited plans for another crusade, but confined himself to collecting the tithes imposed at Lyon, arranging with the great banking houses of Italy to act as his agents. Honorius IV died in 1287 and was succeeded by Nicholas IV. The loss of Acre in 1291 stirred Nicholas to renewed enthusiasm for a crusade. He sent papal legates including the Franciscan John of Monte Corvino to the Great Khan, the Ilkhan Arghun Khan, son of Abaqa, and other leading personages of the Mongol Empire. After his death, he was succeeded briefly by Celestine V and then by Boniface VIII in December 1294. When Frederick III of Sicily attained his throne after the death of his father Peter III of Aragon, Boniface tried to dissuade him from accepting the throne of Sicily. When Frederick persisted, in 1296, Boniface excommunicated him, and placed the island under interdict. Neither the king nor the people were moved. The conflict continued until the Peace of Caltabellotta in 1302, which saw Peter's son Frederick III of Sicily recognized as king of Sicily while Charles II the lame was recognized as king of Naples. To prepare for a crusade, Boniface ordered Venice and Genoa to sign a truce. They fought each other for three more years, and turned down his offer to mediate peace.

=== The Crusade of Charles I of Anjou ===
After Lyon, Gregory X prohibited Charles I of Anjou from launching military actions against the Byzantine Empire, allowing only the sending of reinforcements to Achaea. A new crusade to the Holy Land remained his principal goal and persuaded Charles to start negotiations with Maria of Antioch about purchasing her claim to the Kingdom of Jerusalem. The Haute Cour had already rejected her in favour of Hugh III, of whom the pope had a low opinion. After the death of Gregory, Charles was determined to secure the election of a pope willing to support his plans. Gregory's successor Innocent V had always been supportive of Charles, and he mediated a peace treaty between Charles and Genoa, signed in Rome on 22 June 1276. When John XXI was elected pope on 20 September 1276, he excommunicated Charles' opponents and confirmed the treaty between Charles and Maria on 18 March 1276, transferring her claims to Jerusalem to Charles. Charles I of Anjou now laid claim to the title of King of Jerusalem.

Charles appointed Roger of San Severino to administer the kingdom as bailli, arriving at Acre on 7 June 1277. Hugh III's bailiff, Balian of Arsuf, surrendered the town without resistance. Initially only the Hospitallers and the Venetians acknowledged Charles as the lawful ruler. The barons of the realm later paid homage to San Severino in January 1278, after he had threatened to confiscate their estates. John XXI died early in 1277 and could not prevent the election of his nemesis Nicholas III later that year. Charles swore fealty to the new pope on 24 May 1278 after lengthy negotiations. Nicholas then confirmed the excommunication of Charles' enemies in Piedmont and started negotiations with Rudolph of Habsburg to prevent him from making an alliance against Charles with Margaret of Provence and Edward I of England. Charles had meanwhile inherited Achaea from William II of Villehardouin, who had died on 1 May 1278. Nicephoros I of Epirus acknowledged Charles' suzerainty on 14 March 1279 to secure his assistance against the Byzantines. Nicholas III died on 22 August 1280 and, after much intrigue, one of Charles' staunchest supporter was elected as pope Martin IV on 22 February 1281, dismissing his predecessor's relatives.

Michael VIII Palaeologus had been excommunicated and the pope soon authorized Charles to invade Byzantium. Hugh of Sully, Charles vicar in Albania, had already unsuccessfully launched the Siege of Berat in 1280. The victory at Berat the next year represented the emperor's greatest success in battle over the Latins since the Battle of Pelagonia in 1259. On 3 July 1281, Charles and his son-in-law Philip of Courtenay, the titular Latin emperor, made an alliance with Venice for the restoration of the Roman Empire. They decided to start a full-scale campaign early the next year.

Margaret of Provence called Robert II of Burgundy and Otto IV of Burgundy and other lords who held fiefs in the Kingdom of Arles to a meeting at Troyes in the autumn of 1281. They were willing to unite their troops to prevent Charles' army from taking possession of the kingdom, but Philip III of France strongly opposed his mother's plan and Edward I would not promise any assistance to them. Charles' ships started to assemble at Marseilles to sail up the Rhone in the spring of 1282. Another fleet was gathering at Messina to start the crusade against the Byzantine Empire.

In 1279, a former chancellor of Manfred of Sicily named John of Procida is credited with plotting against Charles convincing Michael VIII Palaeologus, the Sicilian barons and Nicholas III to support a revolt. Michael's wealth enabled him to send money to the discontented Sicilian barons. Peter III of Aragon decided to lay claim to Sicily in late 1280 and he did not hide his disdain when he met with Charles II of Naples in December 1280. He began to assemble a fleet, ostensibly for another crusade to Tunis. Through John's secret diplomatic actions the conditions were set enabling the destruction of Charles' crusading invasion fleet (aimed first at recapturing Constantinople) at anchor in Messina. This provided the conditions for the security of Constantinople and the ability of Peter III to recover the island.

== The Situation in Outremer ==
The extent of the Crusader states after Saladin's conquests in 1187 was not significantly different in 1272.

The Crusader states, known as Outremer, had not changed much in the century after Saladin's capture of Jerusalem in 1187. At their largest in 1144 following the successes of the First Crusade, the loss of Edessa that year was the first blow which could not be reversed by the Second Crusade. The Third Crusade did not recover Jerusalem and Frankish Outremer had not changed significantly after the end of the last of the major Crusades in 1272. The Fourth Crusade reworked the Byzantine Empire in 1204, but it was back force in 1261. The Fifth Crusade met disaster in Egypt, and the return of Jerusalem in 1229 after the Sixth Crusade was temporary, with Jerusalem lost along with the military strength of the Frankish kingdom in 1244. The Seventh Crusade and Eighth Crusade never advanced past North Africa. Some territory changed hands through the various minor Crusades, but the Frankish presence in the Holy Land continued to shrink through 1277.

=== Principality of Galilee ===
The Principality of Galilee was essentially destroyed by Saladin in 1187, although the title "Prince of Galilee" was used by some relatives of the kings of Cyprus, the titular kings of Jerusalem. Some of its former holdings were briefly reclaimed by a treaty made during the Barons' Crusade of 1239–1241, but by 1272, the only fief that remained in Frankish hands was Beirut. At that time, Hugh III of Cyprus considered it his duty to defend Outremer, but did not either expect or desire a crusade. He rather wished to preserve the truce with the sultan Baibars, weak as it was. His first setback was losing control of Beirut. The lordship of Beirut had passed to Isabella of Beirut upon the death of her father John II of Ibelin in 1264. Isabella's liaison with Julian of Sidon provoked the papal letter De sinu patris which strongly urged her to marry. In 1272 she married Haymo Létrange––the Foreigner––a wealthy lord who may have been a companion of Edward I. Haymo died in 1273. While on his deathbed, he put Isabella and Beirut under the unusual protection of Baibars. Hugh III wanted to use Isabella's status as a wealthy heiress to choose a new husband for her, in order to attract a knight to the fight in the Holy Land. Hugh forcibly took Isabella to Cyprus to arrange a new marriage, leaving her mother Alice de la Roche as regent of Beirut. Isabella resisted and received the support of both Baibars and the Knights Templar. The matter was brought to the Haute Cour and became a political dispute. The court ruled in favor of Baibars and Mamluk guards were assigned to Isabella's protection. After Baibars' death in 1277, Hugh resumed control of the fief and, when died in 1282, Beirut passed to her sister Eschive of Ibelin, the wife of Humphrey de Montfort, a loyal friend of Hugh's.

=== Principality of Antioch ===
The fall of the Principality of Antioch began shortly after the end of the first of Louis IX's Crusades when, in 1254, Bohemond VI of Antioch married Sibylla of Armenia. This ended an epic power struggle, with Armenia was the more powerful and Antioch a vassal state. Both were swept up by the conflict between the Mamluks and the Mongols. In 1260, under the influence of his father-in-law Hethum I of Armenia, Bohemond VI submitted to the Mongol ruler Hulagu, making Antioch a tributary state to the Mongols. Bohemond and Hethum fought on the side of the Mongols during the conquests Syria, taking first Aleppo and then Damascus.

When the Mongols were defeated at the Battle of Ain Jalut in 1260, Baibars began to threaten Antioch, which, as a vassal of the Armenians, had supported the Mongols. Baibars finally took the city after the Siege of Antioch in 1268, and all of northern Syria was quickly under Egyptian control. The exception was the city of Latakia at which the Franks had a minor victory. Latakia, lost to Saladin in 1188, had recently been recaptured from the Mamluks. It remained the only portion of the principality still under Frankish control. Baibars did not consider it to be covered by his treaties with Tripoli or with Acre and his army had the city surrounded. The Latakians appealed to Hugh III who was able to negotiate a truce with Baibars.

Ownership of the castle at Maraclea remained a matter of dispute between the principality and the Hospitallers. In 1271, the city itself was destroyed by the Mamluks. The Lord of Maraclea was a vassal of Bohemond's named Barthélémy de Maraclée who fled from the Mamluk offensive, taking refuge in Persia at the Mongol Court of Abaqa, where he exhorted the Mongols to intervene in the Holy Land.

=== County of Tripoli ===
Hugh III also had problems within the County of Tripoli. Bohemond VI of Antioch died in 1275, leaving two underaged children Bohemond VII of Tripoli and Lucia, Countess of Tripoli. Hugh, as the senior member of the House of Antioch, claimed the regency of Tripoli. But the princess Sibylla of Armenia, Bohemond VI's widow, had immediately assumed power. When Hugh arrived at Tripoli to assert his claim, Bohemond VII had already been sent to the court of his uncle Leo II of Armenia, who succeeded his father Hethum I in 1269. In Bohemond's absence, the city was administered by Bartholomew Mansel, the bishop of Tortosa. Hugh did not enjoy popular support in Tripoli. Bartholomew had the people's support but was the bitter enemy of Paul of Segni, the bishop of Tripoli and Bohemond VI's uncle. Paul of Segni and his sister Lucienne of Segni had installed many loyalist Romans in the county who subsequently were purged by Sibylla and Bartholomew, some exiled and other put to death. Complicating the situation, Paul of Segni was supported by the Templars, having met Guillaume de Beaujeu at Lyon. The arrival of Bohemond VII from Armenia in 1277 to take over the government would lead to civil war in the county.

=== Lordship of Tyre ===
At the creation of the kingdom in 1099, Tyre remained in Muslim hands and was paying tribute to the Crusaders. On 7 July 1124, the Siege of Tyre was successful, bringing the last city to be taken by the Frankish army, supported by a fleet of the Venetian Crusade. In 1246, Henry I of Cyprus separated Tyre from the royal domain and created a quasi-independent Lordship of Tyre, under its first lord Philip of Montfort. In 1257, one year after the beginning of the War of Saint Sabas between Genoa and Venice over control of Acre, Philip expelled the Venetians from the one third of the city that had been conceded to them more than a century earlier.

In May 1269, Baibars led an abortive raid upon Tyre after failed negotiations towards a truce. In September 1269, Hugh III was crowned king of Jerusalem in Tyre and a year later, Philip was killed by an Assassin, apparently in the employ of Baibars. He was succeeded by his eldest son, John of Montfort who entered into a treaty with Baibars, transferring control over several villages to him. In 1277, he also restored Venetian privileges. Tyre would enter into a treaty with Baibars' successor Qalawun in 1284 and would remain in Christian hands until 1291.

=== The Remnants of the Kingdom ===
After his crusade ended, Edward I, together with Hugh III, negotiated a truce with Baibars. A 10-year-10-month-and-10-day agreement was reached in May 1272, at Caesarea. Nevertheless, Hugh's problems with Acre began in earnest, reflecting a long-held opposition to his direct rule. The Templars had both disapproved with his reconciliation with the Montforts and had opposed his accession to the throne. He may have looked to the Hospitallers for help, but their influence had faded after the loss of its headquarters at Krak des Chevaliers. Its only remaining great castle in Syria was Margat. By 1268, Hugues de Revel, wrote that the Hospital could maintain but 300 knights in the Holy Land, down from a peak of 10,000. But the Templars still possessed Tortosa, Sidon, the Château Pèlerin, and maintained formidable banking connections. Thomas Bérard, Templar Grand Master through 1273, disliked Hugh but had never openly challenged him. His successor Guillaume de Beaujeu was elected in Apulia, the territory of his cousin Charles I of Anjou. He came to the Holy Land in 1275 determined to further Charles' projects and opposed to the priorities of Hugh III.

In October 1276, the Templars purchased a village south of Acre called La Fauconnerie (La Féve), deliberately omitting to secure Hugh's consent to the transaction. As the latest in a string of complaints that were ignored, he decided to leave the kingdom, retiring first to Tyre with the intention of sailing to Cyprus. He left Acre without appointing a bailli. The Templars and the Venetians were happy to see Hugh leave, but they were in the minority. The Latin patriarch, Hospitallers, Teutonic Knights and the Genoese sent delegates to Tyre to plead with him to return, or at least appoint a responsible party. He was too angry at first to listen to them, but at last, probably on the pleading of John of Montfort, he appointed Balian of Ibelin as administrator as well as various judges for kingdom's courts. He then embarked for Cyprus where he wrote to the pope to justify his actions. Balian had the impossible task of maintaining the government of the kingdom in the absence of a king, real or claimant. The Templars and the Hospitallers backed competing factions and the Venetians and the Genoese exhibited old hostilities.

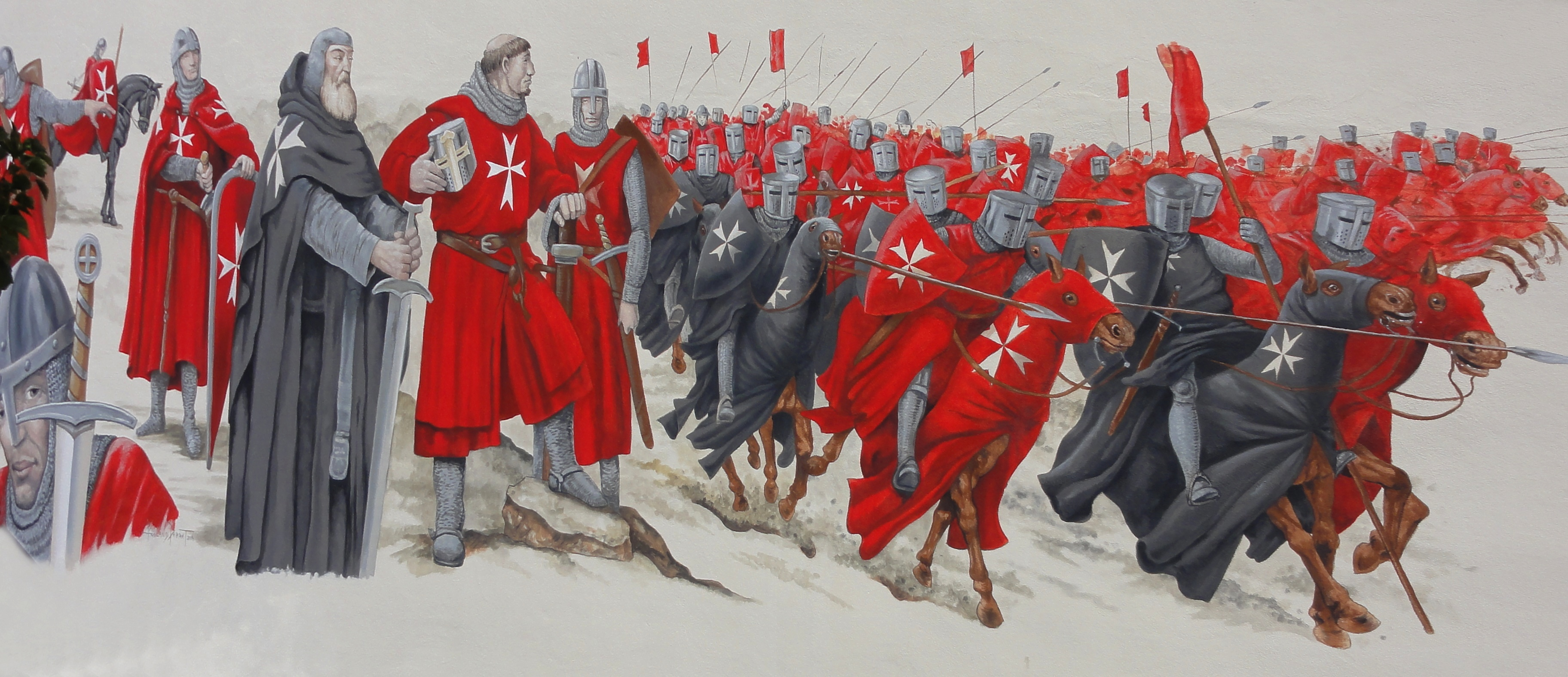
The Knights Hospitaller in the 13th century

Shortly thereafter, Charles I of Anjou assumed the title of king, but was engrossed elsewhere, and his interests in the Holy Land were handled by Roger of San Severino. Thanks to the help of the Templars and Venetians, Roger and his accompanying forces were able to land at Acre, where he produced credentials signed by Charles, Maria of Antioch and John XXI. Balian of Ibelin was caught off guard as he was without instructions from Hugh, and was opposed by the Templars and Venetians. Neither the Latin patriarch or the Hospitallers would intervene. Avoiding bloodshed, Balian delivered the Citadel of Acre, a Hospitaller site, to Roger who hoisted Charles' banner. The barons hesitated to support this state of affairs, primarily objecting to the thought that the throne of the kingdom could be transferred without a decision of the Haute Cour. They sent a delegation to Cyprus asking Hugh to release them from their allegiance to him. Hugh refused to give an answer. Finally, Roger threatened confiscation of the estates of those who would not pay him homage. After further entreaties to Hugh, again fruitless, the barons acquiesced and soon Bohemond VII of Tripoli acknowledged him as lawful bailli. Roger soon installed those loyal to Charles in key positions.

== The Mamluks ==
The problems in Outremer were much to the benefit of Baibars, as he could trust that Roger of San Severino would not promote a new Crusade nor to engage in activities with the Mongols. With minimal threats from the Franks, he could deal with the Ilkhanate. Abaqa was keenly aware of the dangers posed by the Mamluks and wished to build an alliance with the West, culminating in his sending embassies to Lyon in 1274. In 1276, he tried again, with a letter to Edward I of England, apologizing that he had been unable to provide more help in 1271. None of this produced any results as Edward I wished to go on another crusade, but neither he nor Philip III of France was ready yet to do so. With a succession of new popes that year, the Papal Curia was very influential and strongly influenced by Charles I of Anjou, who disliked the Mongols intensely as the friends of his enemies, the Byzantines and the Genoese. At that time, the policy of Charles I was one of entente with Baibars. The popes also hoped to bring the Mongols into the Church. Even Leo II of Armenia, both a Mongol vassal and in communion with Rome, could not produce any results.

=== Baibars' Final Invasions ===
Baibars was able to pursue his ambitions without the threat of Western intervention. Early in 1275, he led a raid into Armenian Cilicia, sacking the cities of the plain, but was unable to advance to Sis. Undeterred, he invaded the Seljuk Sultanate of Rûm. Sultan Kaykhusraw II was the last of the powerful rulers of Rûm and was a vassal of the Mongols. After his death in 1246, his son Kilij Arslan IV became sultan, dying in 1266. The new sultan was now Arslan's young son Kaykhusraw III. His minister, Pervâne Suleyman was the chief power in the land but was unable to control the local emirates. The Ilkhan maintained Rûm as a protectorate, enforced by a Mongol garrison. On 18 April 1277, this garrison was routed by the Mamluks at the Battle of Elbistan. Pervâne was in command of the Seljuk contingent and fled with Kaykhusraw III to Tokat. Five days later, Baibars made a triumphal entry into Kayseri, then returning to Syria. At the news of his troops' defeat, Abaqa hastened to Anatolia, sternly punished the Seljuks, with massacres of tens of thousands of people reported. Pervâne, who had rushed to congratulate Baibars on his victory, was held by Abaqa responsible for the Mamluk campaign and had him killed. It was rumored that the flesh of Pervâne was served to his subjects at a state banquet. Abaga quickly recovered control of the sultanate.

=== The Death of Baibars ===
Baibars did not long survive his Anatolian invasion. He died in Damascus on 1 July 1277. As he was the greatest enemy to Christendom since Saladin, there was rejoicing throughout the Holy Land and Europe at the news of his death. His successor was his eldest son, al-Said Barakah, a weak youth who set about limiting the power of the emirs from his father's administration and promoting those loyal to him. One such emir was al-Mansûr Qalawun, whose daughter had married Barakah. In 1279, the sultan and his father-in-law, commander of the Syrian troops, were on a campaign in Armenian Cilicia when a revolt occurred in Cairo. Returning home, Barakah abdicated in favor of his seventeen-year-old brother Badr al-Din Solamish. Qalawun installed himself as atabeg and essentially took over the government. Within four months, Qalawun displaced the child and proclaimed himself sultan.

=== Qalawun ===
Qalawun was a Kipchak who became a mamluk in the 1240s after being sold to a member of the household of Ayyubid sultan al-Kamil's household. He was known as al-Alfī (the Thousander) as it was believed that the sultan's son as-Salih Ayyub bought him for a thousand dinars of gold. Qalawun rose in power and influence and became an emir under Baibars and eventually became sultan after displacing Baibars' heirs. In 1279, Qalawun took the title al-Malik al-Manṣūr (the victorious king). In Damascus, its viceroy Sunqur al-Ashqar used the turmoil of succession in Cairo to assert Syrian independence, declaring himself sultan. Sunqur's claim of leadership was soon quashed, and he was soon ensconced in Sahyun Castle. The common threat of the Mongols caused a reconciliation of Qalawun and Sunqur. Abaqa had invaded Syria, taking Aleppo in October 1280.

Barakah, Solamish and their brother Khadir were exiled to al-Karak, once a Crusader castle taken by the Ayyubids in 1188. Barakah died there in 1280 (possibly poisoned on the orders of Qalawun), and Khadir gained control of the castle. In 1286, Qalawun took it over directly. As his predecessor had, Qalawun entered into land control treaties with what was left of the Crusader states, Military Orders and individual lords who wished to remain independent. He also recognized Tyre and Beirut as separate from the Kingdom of Jerusalem, now centered on Acre. The treaties were always in Qalawun's favor, and his treaty with Tyre mandated that the city would not build new fortifications, would stay neutral in conflicts between the Mamluks and other Crusaders, and Qalawun would be allowed to collect half the city's taxes. In 1281, Qalawun also negotiated an alliance with the emperor Michael VIII Palaiologos in order to foster resistance against Charles I of Anjou, who was threatening both Byzantium and the kingdom.

Qalawun's truce with the Hospitallers at Acre and Bohemond VII was to last 10 years. The Hospitallers at Margat did not respect this treaty and joined the Mongol forces of Möngke Temür. Qalawun and Sunqur al-Ashqar, now working together, engaged the Ilkhanate in combat. resulting in the defeat of the Mongols at the bloody Second Battle of Homs on 29 October 1281. Qalawun would take his revenge on Margat. On 17 April 1285, in spite of the agreement of peace, Qalawun attacked Margat. The Hospitallers negotiated their surrender and Margat capitulated on May 25. They were allowed to leave with 2,000 gold coins and what 25 mules could carry. They left for Tripoli and Tortosa. Rather than destroy Margat as he did with other fortresses, Qalawun repaired its defenses and placed a strong garrison there due to its strategic value.

Qalawun's early reign was marked by policies that were meant to gain the support of important societal elements, namely the merchant class, the Muslim bureaucracy and the religious establishment. These policies included extensive construction projects at Islam's holiest sites, such as the Prophet's Mosque in Medina, the al-Aqsa Mosque in Jerusalem and the Ibrahimi Mosque in Hebron. He also reduced taxes on the merchant community. After 1280, Qalawun launched a large-scale arrest campaign to eliminate internal dissent, imprisoning dozens of high-ranking emirs in Egypt and Syria. He also began other construction activities focusing on more secular and personal purposes, including the Qalawun Complex in Cairo across from the tomb of as-Salih Ayyub. In contrast to his Mamluk predecessors who focused on establishing madrasas, the complex was built to gain the goodwill of the public, create a lasting legacy, and secure his spot in the afterlife. Its location facing as-Salih's tomb was meant demonstrate Qalawun's lasting connection to his former master and to honor the Salihiyyah. While the Salihi mamluks were typically Kipchaks, Qalawun diversified mamluk ranks purchasing numerous non-Turks, particularly Circassians (from which the Burji dynasty was born in the next century).

== The Kingdom through Henry II ==
At the end of Lord Edward's Crusade, the House of Lusignan had ruled the Kingdom of Jerusalem for four years and would maintain their dominance through the kingdom's demise. Hugh III of Cyprus was King of Cyprus when he began to rule Jerusalem and was a rival of Charles I of Anjou. He was succeeded by his son John I of Cyprus, serving a short-lived term from 1284 to 1285. He was succeeded by his brother Henry II of Cyprus who would be the last king of Jerusalem.

=== Civil War in Outremer ===
When Bohemond VII returned to Tripoli in 1277, he was already on bad terms with the Templars. Soon thereafter, he got into a quarrel with his vassal and cousin Guy II Embriaco. Guy had been promised the hand of a local heiress for his brother. Bartholomew Mansel had other ideas, convincing Bohemond to consent to the marriage of the young lady to Bartholomew's nephew. In response, Guy kidnapped the girl and married her to his brother, fleeing to the Templars. Bohemond responded by destroying the Templars' buildings at Tripoli and cutting down a nearby forest that they owned. Templar grand master Guillaume de Beaujeu immediately led his knights against Tripoli, first burning the castle at Botroun. He then attacked Fort Nephin, which resulted in the capture of numerous Templars. The Templars soon moved back to Acre, and Bohemond began an attack on Byblos, a city ruled by Guy. Guy and a contingent of Templars met him, engaging in a fierce battle north of Botroun. Bohemond's small force was defeated and he accepted a year-long truce, broken in 1278 when Guy and the Templars attacked once more. Once again Bohemond was defeated and he responded with a naval attack against Templar positions in Sidon. Hospitaller grand master Nicolas Lorgne intervened and arranged another truce.

Guy remained determined to capture Tripoli. On 12 January 1282, Guy, his brother and others entered Tripoli expecting to be greeted by his Templar allies, but owing a misunderstanding, the Templar commander was absent. Fearing treachery, Guy sought refuge in the house of the Hospitallers. After an hours-long standoff, he was convinced to surrender to Bohemond on the promise that his and his companions' lives would be spared. His friends were blinded, but Bohemond had Guy and his relatives taken to Nephin and buried up to their necks in sand in the moat. There they were left to starve to death. Guy died in February 1282.

To the south, the government of Roger of San Severino at Acre was resented by the local nobles. In 1277, the Templars under Guillaume de Beaujeu attempted enlist John of Montfort as an ally. They initially succeeded in reconciling John with the Venetians, who were allowed to return to Tyre. In 1279, Hugh III brought a large Cypriot army to Tyre, hoping that a display of strength and bribery would be enough to restore his authority over the city. John was on his side, but de Beaujeu's enduring opposition to Hugh frustrated the plan. Upon returning to Cyprus, he seized the Templars' properties and destroyed their fortifications in reprisal. The Templars complained to the pope, who asked Hugh to restore their property, but he declined.

=== Second Battle of Homs ===
When Hugh came to Tyre with his army in 1279, he may have planned to assist the Mongols in their attempted invasion of the Mamluk-held Levant. Abaqa was eager to strike in Syria before Qalawun could consolidate his power as Damascus was still defying Cairo. In September 1280, the Mongol army crossed the Euphrates and occupied the strategic fortifications of Aintab, Baghras and Darbsak. On 20 October 1280, they took Aleppo, pillaging the city and burning the mosques, send the Moslem inhabitants fleeing south to Damascus. Soon thereafter, a Mongol ambassador appeared at Acre asking the Franks to join their offensive. The Hospitallers forwarded the message to Edward I, but no response came from Acre. Qalawun acted swiftly on the news of the coming Mongol invasion. He made peace with Sunqur and signed a ten-year truce with the Hospitallers and Templars on 3 May 1281, supplementing the one already in force with Acre. On 16 July 1281, Bohemond VII entered into a similar pact.

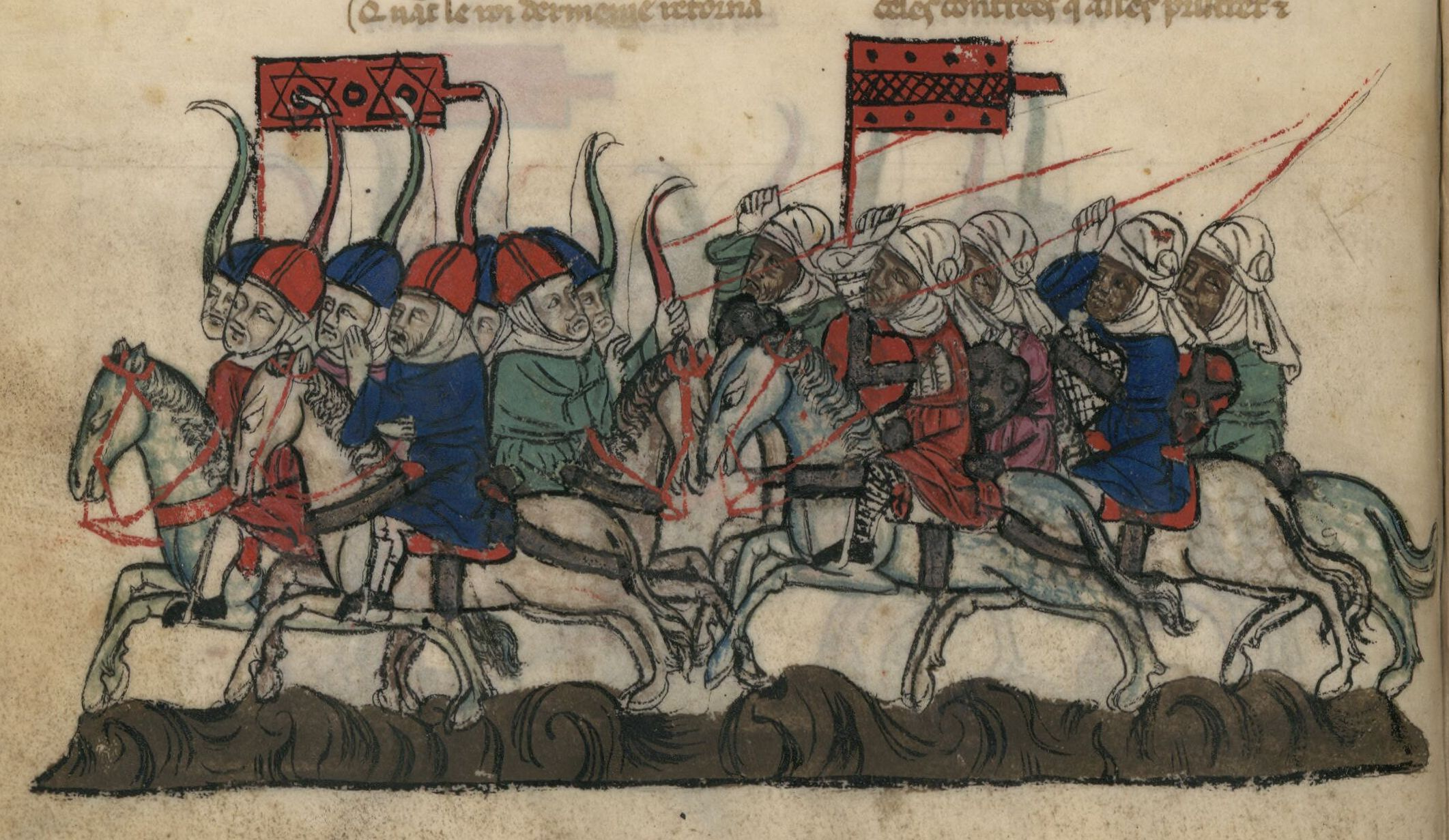
Defeat of the Mongols at the Second Battle of Homs, 1281.

The Second Battle of Homs was set in motion in September 1281 with two Mongol armies advancing into Syria. The first was commanded by Abaqa, attacking the Moslem fortresses along the Euphrates. The second was under his brother Möngke Temur who first joined with the Armenians and then marched into the Orontes valley. He had an impressive force of 50,000 Mongol troops, with 30,000 Armenians, Georgians, Greeks, and 200 Hospitallers from Margat. Qalawun had assembled his forces at gone to Damascus and then moved to the north. On 30 October 1281, the opposing armies met outside Homs. Temur commanded the center, with other Mongols on his left, and on his right the Georgians, Armenians and Hospitallers. The Mamluk center was led by Qalawun with Egyptians and Damascenes under Lajin al-Ashqar, with his right commanded by al-Mansur II Muhammad of Hama and on the left was Sunqur al-Ashqar leading the Syrians and Turcomans.

The Christian forces on the Mongol right routed the Syrians and pursued Sunqur to his camp at Horns, leaving their flank uncovered. The Mongol left held firm, but Temur was wounded in the attack and he ordered a retreat, isolating the Armenians. Leo II of Armenia, leading that force fled to the north with heavy loss of life. Qalawun had lost too many men to follow and so the Mongol army fled across the Euphrates without further losses. The English Hospitaller Joseph of Chauncy was present at the battle and wrote a letter to Edward I of England describing it. In it, Joseph shielded Hugh III and Bohemond VII, claiming they were unable to join the battle (on the Mongol side), shielding them from the anger of the king. In fact, Hugh had done nothing and Bohemond had made a truce with the Moslems. Even worse, Roger of San Severino made a special effort to congratulate Qalawun on his victory.

=== The Fall of Charles I and Hugh III ===
On 30 March 1282, the Sicilians rebelled against Charles I of Anjou and his soldiers and massacred the French on the island. A popular uprising against Charles' government known as the Sicilian Vespers began. The rebels, many of the Sicilian nobles, asked Peter III for help, offering him the crown as they considered his wife their rightful queen. After receiving an embassy from the rebels, they traveled to Sicily and were proclaimed king and queen of Sicily, beginning the House of Barcelona as Peter I the Great (Peter III of Aragon) and Constance II of Sicily, on 4 September 1282. Charles was forced to flee across the Straits of Messina and be content with his Kingdom of Naples. With Martin IV's bull dated 18 November 1282, he again excommunicated Michael—as well as Peter, John of Procida, and Benedetto Zaccaria—as part of the conspiracy that led to the Sicilian Vespers. Skirmishes and raids continued to occur in southern Italy. Aragonese guerillas attacked Catona and killed Peter of Alençon in January 1283. The Aragonese seized Reggio Calabria in February and the Sicilian admiral, Roger of Lauria, annihilated a newly raised Provençal fleet at Malta in April. However, tensions arose between the Aragonese and the Sicilians and in May 1283 one of the leaders of the anti-Angevin rebellion, Walter of Caltagirone, was executed for his secret correspondence with Charles' agents.

The collapse of Charles' power was a surprise to Qalawun, but he still needed to keep the Franks from forming an alliance with the Mongols. In June 1283, when the truce signed at Caesarea ended, Qalawun offered the seneschal Odo Poilechien to renew it for another ten years. Odo accepted, but he was unsure of his authority and so the treaty was signed in the name of the Commune of Acre and the Templars of Château Pèlerin and Sidon. It guaranteed the Franks in their possession of the territory from the Ladder of Tyre to Mount Carmel and included the Templar sites. Tyre and Beirut were excluded, but the right of pilgrimage to Nazareth was maintained.

Odo was glad to preserve the peace as Hugh III was again to try to recover his mainland kingdom. Isabella of Beirut had died and the city had passed to her sister Eschive of Ibelin. Eschive was married to Humphrey of Montfort, the younger brother of John of Montfort. Believing that he could trust the brothers, Hugh sailed from Cyprus in July 1283 with his sons Henry II and Bohemond. Unfavorable winds blew them from Acre to Beirut, arriving on I August. He sailed on to Tyre, sending his troops by land down the coast where they were attacked by Muslim raiders. While Hugh was at Tyre, he was not met by officials at Acre, who preferred the hands-off style of government provided by Odo Poilechien. Hugh's Cypriot nobles would not stay in Tyre for more than the lawfully required four months. Then on 13 November, Hugh's heir-apparent Bohemond died, followed soon after by the death of his close friend John of Montfort. The lordship of Tyre then passed to John's brother Humphrey, who then died the following February 1284. His widow Eschive then married Hugh's youngest son Guy of Poitiers-Lusignan who left his position of constable of Cyprus to go to Beirut. Tyre remained under the rule of John's widow Margaret of Antioch-Lusignan, coincidentally Hugh's sister. Hugh remained on at Tyre where he died on 4 March 1284.

Hugh was succeeded by his eldest son, John I of Cyprus, a boy of about seventeen. He was crowned king of Cyprus at Nicosia on 11 May 1284, and immediately afterwards crossed to Tyre where he was crowned king of Jerusalem. But outside of Tyre and Beirut his authority was unrecognized on the mainland. He reigned only one year, dying of poisoning at Cyprus on 20 May 1285. His successor was his brother Henry II of Cyprus, aged fourteen and suspected of the poisoning. Henry II was crowned king of Cyprus on 24 June 1285, remaining in Cyprus for a year before venturing to Acre where he was crowned king of Jerusalem on 15 August 1286.

=== The Aragonese Crusade ===
The Aragonese Crusade was part of the larger War of the Sicilian Vespers. The Crusade was declared against Peter III of Aragon on 2 February 1284 because Sicily was a papal fief and its conquest by Aragon caused the pope depose Peter III as king. Peter's nephew Charles of Valois, son of Philip III, was anointed as king. The crusade caused a civil war to begin in Aragon, as Peter's brother, James II of Majorca, joined the French. Peter's eldest son Alfonso III of Aragon, was placed in charge of defending the border with Navarre, which was ruled by Philip III's son, Philip IV of France. Philip IV would eventually rule France and oversee the final loss of the Holy Land in 1291.

In 1284, the first French armies under Philip and Charles entered Roussillon. Though the French had James' support, the local populace rose against them. The city of Elne was valiantly defended by the so-called bâtard de Roussillon (bastard of Roussillon), the illegitimate son of Nuño Sánchez, late count of Roussillon. Eventually he was overcome and the cathedral was burnt, and the royal forces continued their advance. In 1285, the city of Girona was taken. Charles was crowned there, but without an actual crown. The French then experienced a reversal at the hands of Roger de Lauria. The French fleet was destroyed at the Battle of Les Formigues on 4 September 1285. The French were dealt a crushing blow at the Battle of the Col de Panissars on 1 October.

Peter III died on 2 November 1285, following the deaths of Philip III and Charles I of Anjou that same year. The wars continued for years until the Battle of the Counts on 23 June 1287, where the Angevins were defeated near Naples. The Treaty of Tarascon of 1291 restored Aragon to Alfonso III and lifted the ban of the church.

=== The Sieges of Margat and Maraclea ===
In the summer of 1285, Qalawun was preparing to attack the Franks in Syria who were not protected by the truce of 1283. The governors Eschive of Beirut and Margaret of Tyre asked for a truce, which was granted. His objective was the castle of the Hospitallers at Margat, who had often allied with the Mongols. On 17 April 1285, he led his army to the foot of the castle beginning the Siege of Margat, bringing a large number of mangonels. The castle was well equipped, and the garrison's mangonels had the advantage of position, destroying many of the attacker's machines. After a month with little progress the Mamluk engineers dug a mine under the Tower of Hope. The mine was lit afire, bringing the tower down. The garrison surrendered and the Hospitaller officers were allowed to leave fully armed, on horseback. The rest of the garrison could take nothing with them but were allowed to live. Qalawun entered the castle on 25 May 1285.

Having established a Mamluk garrison at the supposedly impregnable Hospitaller fortress of Margat, Qalawun turned his attention to the castle of Maraclea. In 1271, the lord of the castle, Barthélémy de Maraclée, a vassal of Bohemond VI of Antioch, had fled from the on-going Mamluk offensive. He took refuge in Persia at the court of Abaqa, where he exhorted the Mongols to intervene on behalf of the Franks. In 1285, Qalawun blackmailed Bohemond VII of Antioch into destroying the last fortifications in the area of Maraclea. Barthélémy was entrenched in a tower standing near the shore. Qalawun said he would besiege Tripoli if the Maraclea fort was not dismantled.

=== Henry II of Cyprus ===
The loss of Margat came shortly after the death Charles I of Anjou on 7 January 1285. The kingdom was falling without the benefit of a king, and Henry II of Cyprus was encouraged by the Hospitallers to send an envoy to negotiate for his recognition as king. The commune of Acre acquiesced and was supported by the grand masters Jacques de Taxi, Guillaume de Beaujeu and Burchard of Schwanden. When Henry landed at Acre on 4 June 1286 where he intended to lodge in the castle, as previous kings had done. But Odo Poilechien refused to leave the castle, where he was garrisoned with a French contingent that reported directly to Philip IV. The Bishop of Famagusta and other religious leaders pleaded with Odo, and eventually drew up a legal protest. Henry II was staying in the palace of Humphrey of Montfort, the late lord of Tyre, and told the French soldiers in the castle that they could leave in peace. The citizens of Acre became frustrated with inaction and prepared to attack Odo. The three grand masters, trying to avoid bloodshed, persuaded Odo to relinquish the castle, and it was given to Henry II on 29 June. On 15 August 1286, Henry II was crowned at Tyre by the archbishop Bonacursus de Gloire. He did not remain long at Acre but returned to Cyprus, leaving Baldwin of Ibelin as bailli.

== The Mongols and the West ==
By the mid-1280s, Abaga's son Arghun took the Ilkhan throne and proposed a new crusade to liberate the Holy Land from the Muslims. Had the proposed Mongol alliance been supported by the Western kingdoms, the existence of Outremer would almost certainly have been prolonged. The recent Mamluk territorial ambitious would have been curtailed, and the Ilkhanate of Persia would be a power friendly to the Christians and the West. Instead, the Mamluk Sultanate would survive to the 16th century, and the Mongols of Persia would shift to Islam.

=== Arghun ===
The Mongol Ilkhanate at Tabriz remained a threat to the kingdom. Abaqa had died on 4 April 1282 and was succeeded by his brother Tekuder. The new Ilkhan had been baptized as a Nestorian under the name of Nicholas, but he was inclined to support the Muslims. Upon taking the throne, Tekuder converted to Islam and took the name of Ahmed and title of sultan. He then proposed a treaty of friendship with Qalawun, a policy that led to complaints to Kubilai Khan. Kubilai authorized a revolt by Abaga's son Arghun in Khorasan where he was governor. Ahmed was turned on by his generals and was murdered on 10 August 1284, allowing Arghun to take the throne. Religion within the Ilkhanate was complicated. Arghun was a Buddhist, his vizier, Sa'ad al-Daula was a Jew, and his friend was the Nestorian Catholicos named Yahballaha III. Yahballaha was an Ongud Turk born in Shanxi who had come west with Rabban Bar Ṣawma to make a pilgrimage to Jerusalem. When the Catholicoate fell vacant in 1281, he was elected to the office. He had a great influence over Arghun, whose objective was to liberate, with the support of Western Christendom, the Holy Land from the Muslims.

In 1285, Arghun wrote to Honorius IV to suggest a common course of action. The letter was delivered by a Christian on the khan's court, Isa Kelemechi, who offered to remove the Mamluks and divide Egypt (called the land of Sham) with the Franks. The message said:

As the land of the Muslims, that is, Syria and Egypt, is placed between us and you, we will encircle and strangle (estrengebimus) it. We will send our messengers to ask you to send an army to Egypt, so that us on one side, and you on the other, we can, with good warriors, take it over. Let us know through secure messengers when you would like this to happen. We will chase the Saracens, with the help of the Lord, the Pope, and the Great Khan.

— Extract from the 1285 letter from Arghun to Honorius IV

Honorius IV was hardly capable of acting on this invasion and could not muster the military support necessary to achieve this plan.

=== Rabban Bar Ṣawma ===
Early in 1287, Arghun again sent an embassy to the West, this time choosing Rabban Bar Ṣawma as his ambassador. In Constantinople, he was received by Andronikos II Palaiologos. The emperor was on excellent terms with the Mongols and was ready to help them. From Constantinople, Bar Ṣawma rode on to Rome where he found that Honorius IV had just died. The twelve Cardinals who were resident in Rome received him, but he found them ignorant and unhelpful, knowing nothing of the spread of Christianity among the Mongols. At his next stop, the Genoese welcomed him, as the Mongol alliance was important to them.

At the end of August, Bar Ṣawma crossed into France, reaching Paris early in September. There he was given an audience by Philip IV who listened with interest to his message. Philip pledged that he would himself lead an army to Jerusalem, and later escorted him to the Sainte-Chapelle to see the sacred relics that Louis IX had bought from Constantinople. When he left Paris, Philip nominated Gobert de Helleville as ambassador to return with him to the Ilkhan's court and arrange further details of the alliance.

Bar Ṣawma next met with Edward I of England at Bordeaux, the capital of his French possessions. Edward had long favored a Mongol alliance and provided measured responses to Sauma's proposals. But neither Edward nor Philip III of France could commit to a timeline for a new crusade. Bar Ṣawma returned to Italy feeling uneasy and met with Cardinal Giovanni Boccamazza and told him his fears. The Egyptians were preparing destroy the last Christian states in the Holy Land, and no one in the West was taking the threat seriously.

=== Nicholas IV ===
Honorius IV died on 3 April 1287 and shortly thereafter the lengthy 1287–1288 papal election commenced. Finally, on 22 February 1288, Nicholas IV was elected pope. One of his first actions was to receive the Mongol ambassador Rabban Bar Ṣawma. They had excellent rapport, with Bar Ṣawma addressing the pope as First Bishop of Christendom and Nicholas acknowledged him as Patriarch of the East. Bar Ṣawma celebrated Mass before all the Cardinals, and he received Communion from the pope himself. He and Gobert de Helleville left Rome in the late spring of 1288, laden with precious relics including a tiara to be presented to Yahballaha and with letters to the Ilkhan court and the Jacobite bishop of Tabriz. The letters were vague and the pope unable to promise a definite date for any action. In 1289, Nicholas dispatched the Franciscan Giovanni da Montecorvino as papal legate to Kubilai Khan, Arghun, and other leading personages of the Mongol Empire, as well as to Yagbe'u Seyon, emperor of Ethiopia.

=== The Situation in Europe ===
The rulers of Europe were too occupied in continental affairs to effectively mount a new crusade. The situation left by Charles I of Anjou and the vindictiveness of the papacy combined to block any serious consideration of another crusade. The pope had given Sicily to the Angevins, and the Sicilians had then turned against them. Both the papacy and France felt obligated to fight for the reconquest of the island, going against Genoa and Aragon, the two prominent naval powers of the Mediterranean. Until the Sicilian question was settled, neither Philip IV nor Nicholas IV could consider a new crusade. In 1286, Edward I managed to arrange a precarious truce between France and Aragon. Edward I also had his own ambitions in Britain, finding it the return to Jerusalem less of a priority than to conquer Wales and Scotland. After the death of Alexander III of Scotland in 1286, Edward looked to the north, as he planned to control the Scottish kingdom through its child-heiress, Margaret, Maid of Norway. The Holy Land would have to wait, as the rulers of Europe were otherwise engaged and there was no strong feeling with the public to urge the monarchs to crusade. As Gregory X had discovered fifteen years previous, the crusading spirit was all but dead.

=== Arghun's Crusade ===
Arghun could not believe that the Christian West, with their claims of devotion to the Holy Land, would not be concerned about its near-certain demise. He welcomed the reports that Rabban Bar Ṣawma and Gobert de Helleville gave, but he needed further information. In April 1289, he sent a second envoy, a Genoese named Buscarello de Ghizolfi with letters for the pope and the monarchs of France and England.

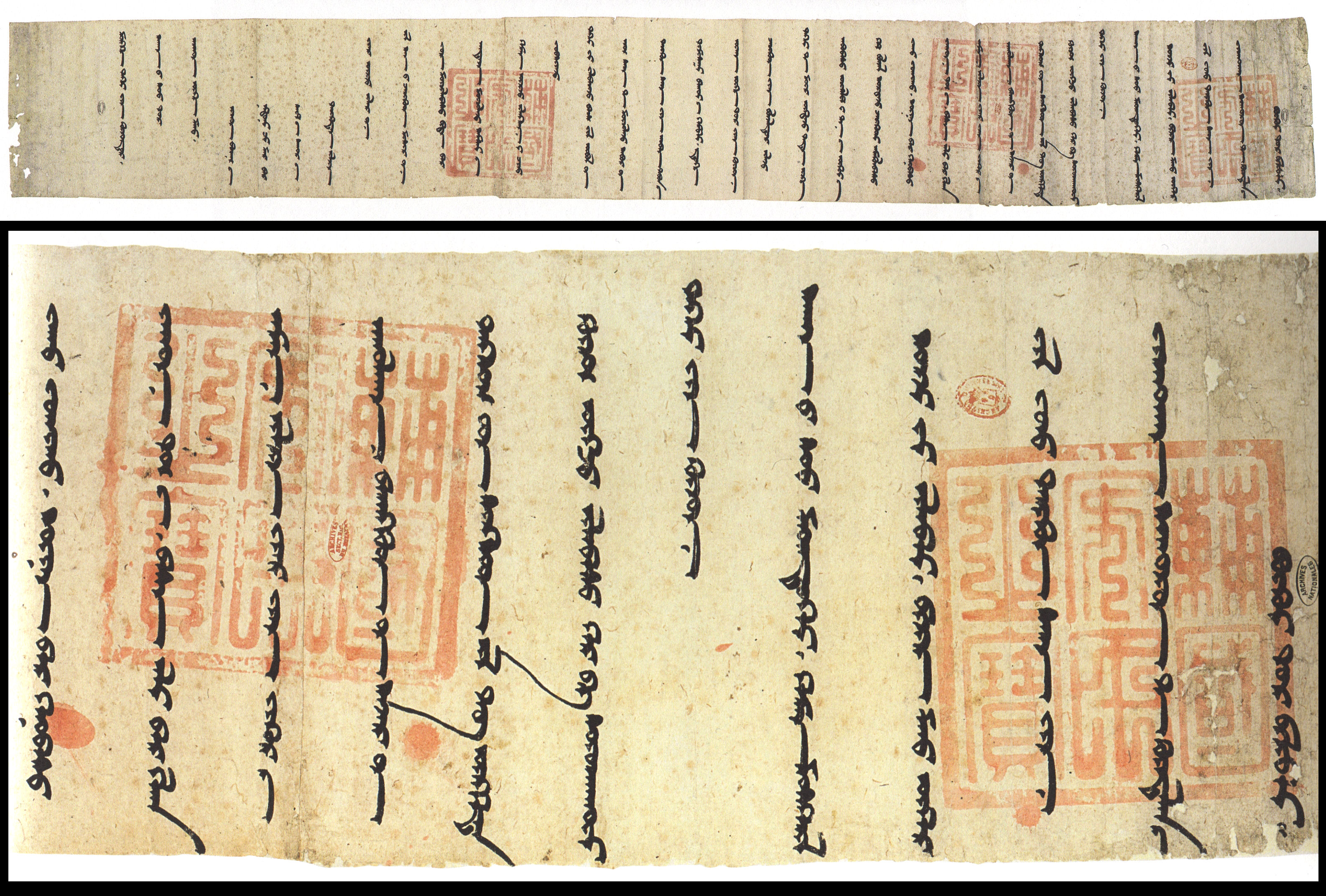
Letter of Arghun to Philip IV of France, dated 1289. The seal is that of the Great Khan. French National Archives.

The letter to Philip IV was written in the name of Kubilai Khan, and in it Arghun proposes to invade Syria in January 1291, to reach Damascus in February. It further proposed that if the king will send his forces and the Mongols capture Jerusalem, it will be France's. Added to the letter is a note in French by Buscarello, which compliments Philip and adds that Arghun will bring with him the Georgian Christians Demetrius II and Vakhtang II and thirty thousand horsemen, and will provide the Westerners provisions. Buscarello then travelled to England to bring Arghun's message to Edward I, arriving in London on 5 January 1290. Edward answered enthusiastically to the project, but deferred the decision about the date to the Pope, failing to make a clear commitment. After his meeting with Edward, Buscarello returned to Persia, accompanied by the English envoy Geoffrey de Langley, a veteran of an earlier crusade.

Unhappy with the responses that Buscarello received, Arghun sent him west once again. He stopped first at Rome, where Nicholas IV received them, and then set out for England. He was armed with urgent letters from the pope who thought the English were likelier crusaders than the French. He reached Edward I early in 1291 with no success. Margaret of Norway had died the previous year, and Edward was immersed in Scottish affairs. By the time they returned, Arghun had died, succumbing to an alchemic potion aimed to lengthen life. He was succeeded by his half-brother Gaykhatu. But by then it was too late, as the fate of Outremer had already been decided.

== The fall of the kingdom ==
Shortly after Henry II returned to Cyprus, open warfare began off the Syrian coast between the Pisans and the Genoese. In early 1287, a Genoese naval squadron was dispatched. One group went to Alexandria to appease Qalawun, while to other patrolled the Syrian coast, attacking ships of the Pisans or Franks. The Templars intervened to keep captured sailors from being sold as slaves. The Genoese then retired to Tyre, to plan an attack on the harbor of Acre. The Venetians joined the Pisans to protect the harbor. They lost a skirmish with the Genoese on 31 May 1287 but the port remained safe. When squadron sailed up from Alexandria, the Genoese were able to blockade the whole coast. The Grand Masters Jean de Villiers and Guillaume de Beaujeu persuaded the Genoese to return to Tyre and allow free passage for shipping.

=== Latakia ===
The port of Latakia had not been impacted by this conflict. However, the merchants of Aleppo had been complaining to Qalawun about sending their goods to a Christian port. Then, on 22 March 1287, an earthquake struck the region, seriously damaged the walls of Latakia. The city and port, as the last remnant of the Principality of Antioch, was not covered by the truce with Tripoli, and so Qalawun sent the Aleppine emir Husam ad-Din Turantai, to take the town. The town fell easily into his hands and, on 20 April, the garrison surrendered, with no relief coming from Christian forces in the area.

Bohemond VII of Antioch, the town's former ruler, died soon after, on 19 October 1287. His heir at Tripoli was Lucia of Tripoli, who now lived in Apulia and was married to Charles I of Anjou's former admiral, Narjot de Toucy. The nobles of Tripoli had other ideas and instead offered the county to Lucia's mother Sibylla of Armenia. Sibylla invited Bartholomew Mansel to be her bailli, which was unacceptable to the nobles. She refused to give way and, in response, they dethroned the dynasty and established a Commune as the sovereign authority. Its first mayor was Bartholomew Embriaco. Sibylla retired to the care of her brother Leo II of Armenia in the Armenian Kingdom of Cilicia, then under a truce with the Mamluks.

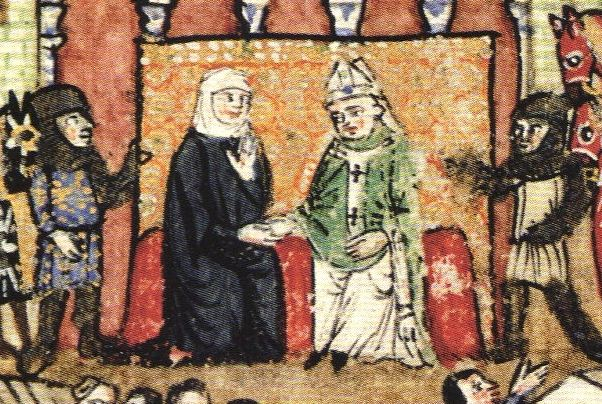
After Bohemond VII's death in 1287, his mother Sibylla of Armenia attempted to appoint bishop Bartholomew Mansel (pictured) to rule Tripoli on her behalf. However, Lucia of Tripoli (pictured) became the last countess until 1289.

Early in 1288, Lucia arrived with her husband at Acre to take her inheritance at Tripoli. She was received by her allies the Hospitallers, who escorted her to the frontier town of Fort Nephin. There she proclaimed her hereditary rights. The Commune responded with their lengthy list of grievances and complaints against actions of her family. Rather than deal with her dynasty, they put themselves under the protection of the Republic of Genoa. The Genoese Doge was informed, dispatching admiral Benedetto I Zaccaria with a naval force to make terms with the Commune. At the same time, the Grand Masters Jean de Villiers, Guillaume de Beaujeu and Burchard von Schwanden went to Tripoli to plead the cause of the heiress, primarily because they backed Venice against Genoa. But they were told that Lucia must recognize the Commune as the government of the county.

=== Lucia of Tripoli ===
When Zaccaria arrived he insisted on a treaty favoring the Genoese and to appoint a podestà to govern the colony, causing concern among the locals. In particular, Barthelemy Embriaco wanted control of the county. He had secured control of Jebail by marrying his daughter Agnes to Peter Embriaco, son of Guido II Embriaco, and sent a message to Qalawun to ascertain the sultan's interest in supporting in this endeavor. The motives of Barthelemy were suspect, and the Commune wrote to Lucia at Acre offering to accept her if she would confirm its position. Lucia shrewdly informed Zaccaria, who was at Ayaş negotiating a treaty with the Armenians. He went to Acre to interview her and she agreed to confirm the privileges both of the Commune and of Genoa. She was shortly thereafter recognized as countess of Tripoli.

Unhappy with this sequence of events, Qalawun was warned by Barthelemy that if the Genoese controlled Tripoli, they would dominate the entire region, and the trade of Alexandria would be imperiled. The sultan took this invitation as an excuse to break his truce with Tripoli. In February 1289, he moved the Egyptian army into Syria, without revealing their objective. However, one of his emirs sent word to the Templars that Qalawun's destination was Tripoli. Guillaume de Beaujeu warned the city, but his warnings were not heeded, and it was suspected that he had invented the story in the hope of being invited to mediate. Nothing was done in the city and at the end of March, the Mamluk army appeared before the city walls.

=== The fall of Tripoli ===
Qalawun started the Siege of Tripoli in March 1289, arriving with a sizable army and large catapults. Inside the city, Lucia was given the supreme authority by the Commune and the nobles alike. The Templars' force was commanded by their marshall, Geoffrey of Vendac, and that of the Hospitallers was led by their marshal Matthew of Clermont. The French regiment marched from Acre under the command of Jean I de Grailly. From Cyprus, Henry II sent his young brother Amalric of Tyre, whom he had just appointed Constable of Jerusalem. There were many galleys and smaller boats protecting the harbor, from Cyprus, Genoa, Venice and Pisa. Meanwhile, many non-combatant citizens fled to Cyprus.

Two of Tripoli's fortified towers soon fell under the bombardment of the Mamluk catapults, and the defenders hastily prepared to flee. The crumbling walls were breached, and the city was captured the city on 26 April 1289. The loss of Tripoli marked the end of an uninterrupted Christian rule of 180 years, the longest of any of the Frankish conquests in the Holy Land. Lucia, the marshals of the orders and Almaric fled to Cyprus. The commander of the Templars Peter of Moncada was killed, as well as Barthelemy Embriaco. The population of the city was massacred, although many managed to escape by ship. Those who had taken refuge on a nearby island were captured by three days later. Women and children were taken as slaves, and 1200 prisoners were sent to Alexandria.

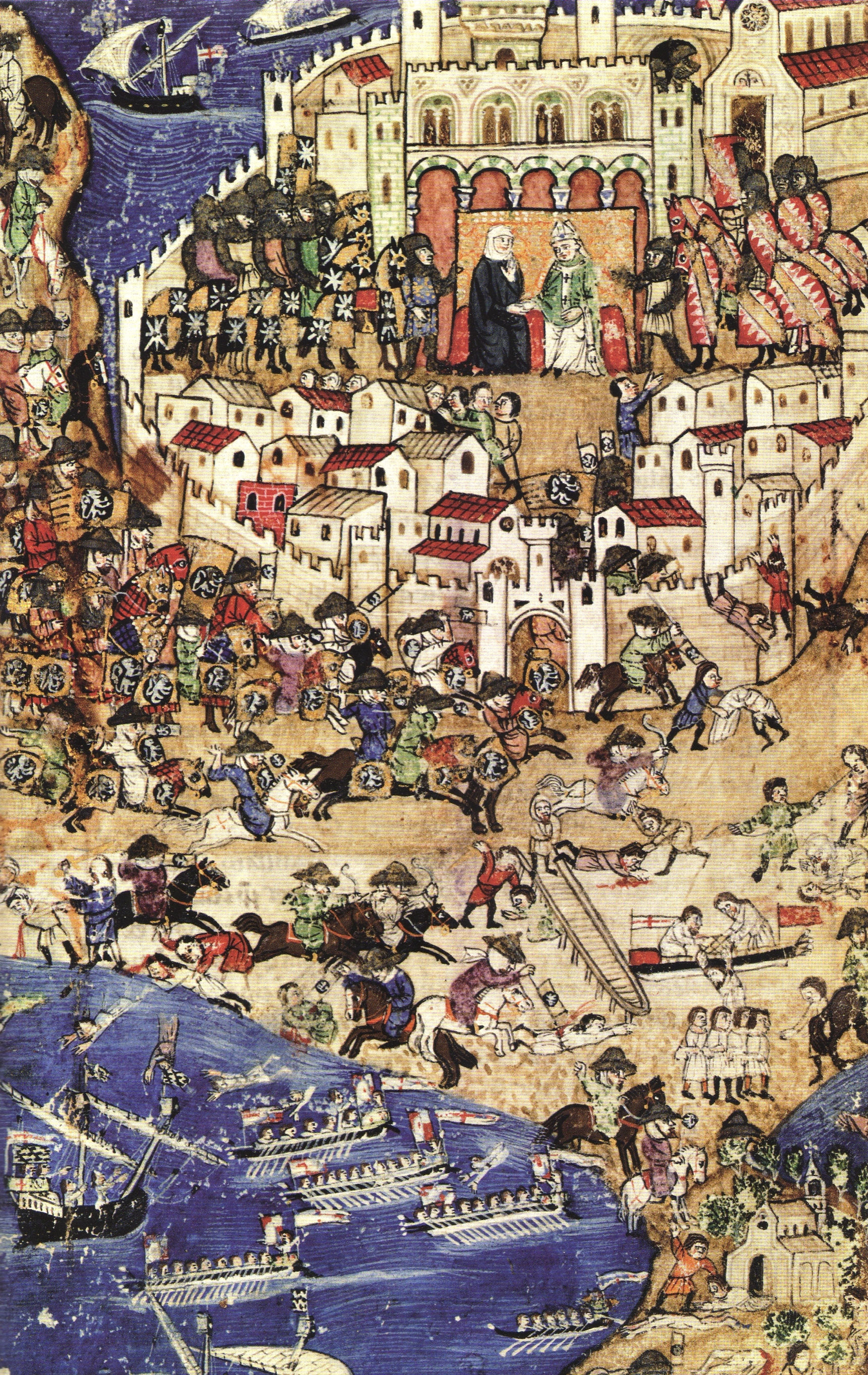
The fall of Tripoli in 1289 triggered frantic preparations to save Acre.

In the area of Tripoli, only Jebail remained free from the Mamluks, remaining under Peter Embriaco for ten years in exchange for the payment of a tribute to the sultan. Tripoli was razed to the ground, and Qalawun ordered a new city to be built a few miles inland at the foot of Mount Pilgrim. Soon other nearby cities were also captured, such as Fort Nephin and Le Boutron.

Three days later, Henry II came to Acre where he met with an envoy from Qalawun. Despite the attack on Tripoli, their 1283 truce was renewed, covering of Jerusalem and Cyprus for another ten years, ten months and ten days. Lucia and Leo II of Armenia soon joined the pact. Henry had little faith in Qalawun's word but could not appeal to the Mongols as that would be breach of the truce. He returned to Cyprus in September, leaving Amalric of Tyre as bailli and sending Jean I de Grailly to Europe, to impress upon them how desperate the situation was.

=== The Crusade of Nicholas IV and the massacre at Acre ===
The West was shocked by the loss of Tripoli, but the Sicilian issue and Edward's Scottish problem was more pressing the leaders. still filled the minds of all except Edward of England; and his Scottish problem was reaching a crisis. Nicholas IV received Jean I de Grailly who briefed him on the situation. Since his discussion with Bar Ṣawma, the pope was inclined to revive the plans for a crusade by Gregory X, which had never been totally abandoned. In 1280, Alfonso X of Castile had asked Edward I to help him assemble ships, and Magnus III of Sweden allocated funds for the crusade in 1285. In 1288, Edward I asked the pope for a delay until 1293. The Ilkhan Arghun was also anxious to begin, and Buscarello de Ghizolfi had gone to Europe towards that goal. The Dominican Riccoldo da Monte di Croce was in Mesopotamia at the time and reported on the satisfaction among the Muslims at the fall of Tripoli.

Nicholas sent funds to support the Holy Land to Latin patriarch Nicholas of Hanapes and dispatched a squadron of galleys to Acre. On 10 February 1290, he proclaimed a crusade with an objective of:

[T]he total liberation of the Holy Land and which, while waiting, would support the places at present held by Christians.

The crusade was preached everywhere including in the Holy Land. For those who took the Cross, the patriarch received the authority to absolve those who had used force against the clergy, supported the Sicilians or had visited the Holy Sepulchre despite pontifical prohibition. All trade with the sultan, including pilgrimages, was prohibited. The departure date for the crusade was 24 June 1293.

Edward I sent a contingent of Savoyard knights led by Otto de Grandson to Acre to bolster the city's defenses. James II of Aragon pledged to provide a force of almogavares and crossbowmen over the next two years, despite having promised Qalawun not to join a crusade in exchange for trading privileges. Genoa had made reprisals for Tripoli by capturing an Egyptian merchant ship and by raiding the port of Tinnis. But when the sultan closed Alexandria to them, they made peace with him. Even the patriarch Nicholas of Hanapes petitioned the pope to lift the embargo, which he did on 21 October 1290.

The pope's call was taken unexpectedly by a group of townsfolk from Lombardy and Tuscany. He accepted their help and put them under the command of Bernard of Montmajour, bishop of Tripoli. The Venetians provided a naval squadron under the command Nicholas Tiepolo, son of Lorenzo Tiepolo, and assisted by Jean I de Grailly. The fleet was soon joined by galleys sent by James II of Aragon. The truce between Henry II and Qalawun had restored the peace at Acre. By summer of 1290, the merchants of Damascus were again sending their caravans to the coast and Acre was bustling. In August, the Italian crusaders arrived and they immediately began causing trouble. Their commanders had no control over them. They had come to fight the infidel and began to attack the Muslim merchants and citizens. At the end of August, a riot flared and they began slaying all Muslims. Deciding that every man with a beard was a Muslim, many Christians were also attacked. All that the authorities could do was do was to rescue a few of the Muslims and take them to the safety of the castle. The ringleaders were arrested, but the damage was done.

The news of the massacre soon reached Qalawun, who decided to eradicate the Franks from the Holy Land. Acre sent apologies and excuses, but he demanded that the guilty parties be handed over to him for punishment. This was rejected as public opinion would not allow the sending of Christians to certain death at the hands of an infidel. Instead, there was an attempt to blame the Muslim merchants. Qalawun had no option to resort to arms, believing that he was legally justified in breaking the truce. He mobilized the Egyptian army and sent the Syrian army to the coast of Palestine. Guillaume de Beaujeu was again alerted, but, as with Tripoli, no one believed him. Sending an envoy to Cairo, Qalawun offered to spare the city in return for a bounty. The offer was rejected and the Templar Grand Master was accused of treason.

=== Death of Qalawun ===
Acre continued to be complacent about the looming threat when news came from Cairo that Qalawun had died. He had given up any attempt to hide his intent to take Acre by force. In a letter to Hethum II of Armenia, he related his vow not to leave a single Christian alive in Acre. In early November 1290, he led his army from Cairo, but immediately fell ill. Six days later, on 10 November 1290, he died at Marjat at-Tin, five miles from Cairo. He was succeeded by his son, al-Ashraf Khalil. On his deathbed, he made Khalil promise to continue the campaign against the Franks. Khalil's transition to sultan was not without incident. In 1280, Qalawun had named Khalil's older brother as-Salih Ali as his heir-apparent, changing his mind at some point. The support for al-Salih Ali was strong and the naming of Khalil as sultan included an attempted assassination by the emir Husam ad-Din Turuntay. Turuntay was killed after three days of torture, and Qalawun was laid to rest when his mausoleum was completed, some two months later.

=== Siege of Acre ===
A map showing the city of Acre in 1291, just prior to its destruction.

By this time, it was now too late in the year to march against Acre, and the Mamluk campaign was postponed to the spring. Acre made one more attempt at negotiations, sending several envoys to Cairo. Khalil refused to receive them, and they were thrown into prison where they did not survive for long. When the weather permitted, Khalil set out from Cairo, in March 1291. The Mamluk army, augmented by several Syrian contingents, greatly outnumbered the crusaders. The army included substantial siege engines from fortresses across the Mamluk empire. On 5 April 1291, Khalil's army arrived before Acre with their vast forces. The Siege of Acre had begun.

The crusaders appeals for aid met with little success. England had sent a few knights and some reinforcements came from Henry II, who fortified the walls and sent troops led by Amalric of Tyre. The only major contingent to leave were the Genoese, who had concluded a separate treaty with Khalil. The forces facing the Mamluks were divided into four components. The first under the orders of Jean I de Grailly and Otto de Grandson. The second under the orders of Henry II and Conrad of Feuchtwangen, the new Grand Master of the Teutonic Knights. The third was under the orders of Jean de Villiers and the grand master of the Order of St. Thomas of Acre. The fourth was under the orders of the grand masters of the Templars and St. Lazarus, Guillaume de Beaujeu and Thomas de Sainville.The Christians were hopelessly outnumbered and, fortunately, many women and children had been evacuated to Cyprus in March. As the sultan's siege began, terms of surrender were discussed. Khalil offered to allow the Christians to depart as long as the city was left undamaged. The Franks refused, apparently concerned at the dishonour of such a concession of defeat. As the Mamluks pounded Acre with their siege engines, the Christians made some vain attempts to launch counterattacks outside the city gates. They were quickly dispatched, and their heads presented to the sultan.

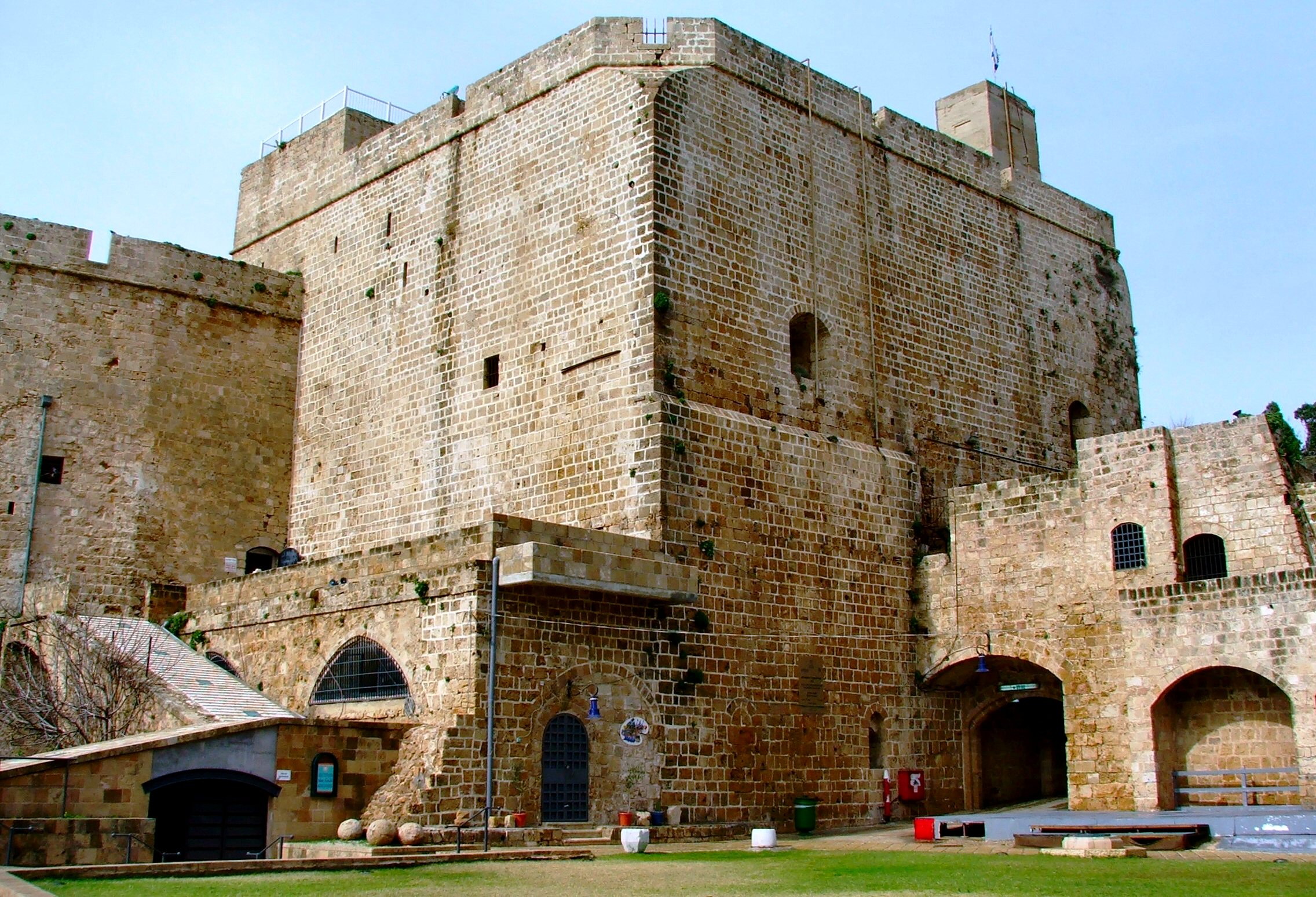
The towers of Acre included the Tower of the Countess of Blois, Accursed Tower, Tower of the Legate, Tower of the Patriarch, Tower of St. Nicholas, English Tower, Germans Tower, Tower of Henry II, Tower of King Hugh and Tower of St. Lazarus. An unknown tower is shown.

By 15 May 1291, Khalil's troops had taken control of the outer battlements, and Acre's towers began to fall under Mamluk control. With panic rising in the city, women and children began to evacuate by ship. Three days later, on 18 May, the attack began with a cacophony of war drums and thousands of Muslims began breaching the walls, some deploying Greek fire. With Acre's defenses punctured, the Franks made a desperate stand to contain the incursion. Marshall of the Hospitallers Matthew of Clermont was killed in the Genoese quarter. In the thick of the fighting, the Templar Guillaume de Beaujeu was killed by a spear piercing his side. Jean de Villiers took a lance thrust between his shoulders but survived.

The sack of Acre soon began. Hundreds were slaughtered as the Mamluks surged through the city. Desperate Franks tried to escape in any remaining boats. Some got away, including Henry II and Amalric, later accused of cowardice. Otto de Grandson took control, commandeering Venetian ships as he could find and placed fellow Savoyard Jean I de Grailly and all soldiers that he could rescue on board, and himself was the last to board. Jean de Villiers was carried to a boat and sailed to safety. Latin patriarch Nicholas of Hanapes drowned when his overburdened craft sank. Many took refuge in the fortified compounds of the Military Orders, many holding out for days. The Templar citadel collapsed on 28 May, killing the Templars within. Those under the Hospitallers' protection were promised safe conduct, only to be led out of the city to be slaughtered.

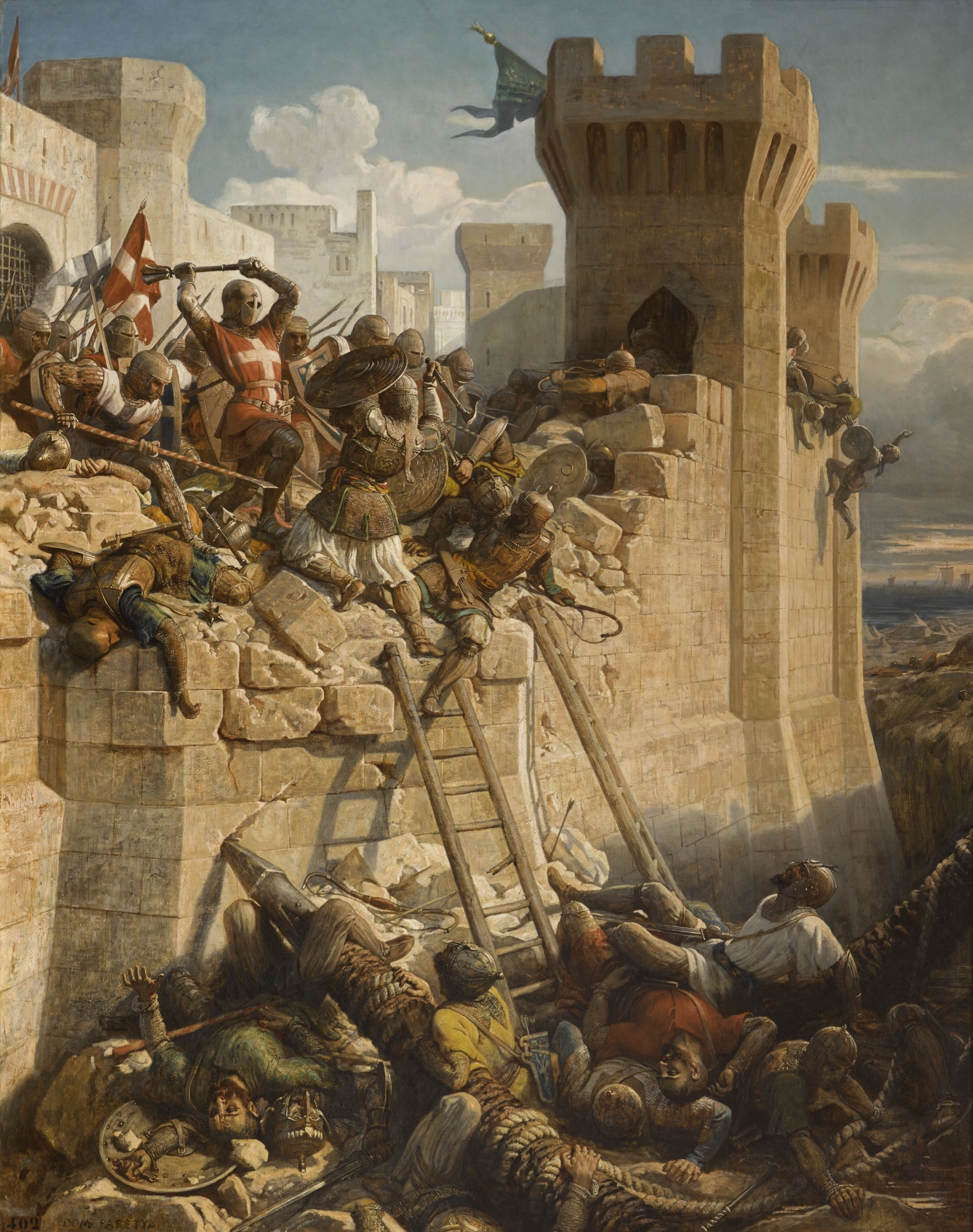
Matthieu de Clermont défend Ptolémaïs en 1291 by Dominique Papety.

The fall of Acre was a fatal blow to the Latin Christians of Outremer. The Hospitaller Master Jean de Villiers survived to pen a letter to Europe describing his experiences, his wound making it difficult to write. He said:

I and some of our brothers escaped, as it pleased God, most of whom were wounded and battered without hope of cure, and we were taken to the island of Cyprus. On the day that this letter was written we were still there, in great sadness of heart, prisoners of overwhelming sorrow.

For the Muslims, the victory at Acre affirmed their faith's dominance over Christianity and their triumph in the war for the Holy Land. Reflecting on this event, Kurdish historian Abu'l Fida wrote:

These conquests [meant that] the whole of Palestine was now in Muslim hands, a result that no one would have dared to hope for or to desire. Thus the [Holy Land was] purified of the Franks, who had once been on the point of conquering Egypt and subduing Damascus and other cities. Praise be to God!

The siege of Acre was depicted in a painting displayed in the Salles des Croisades (Hall of Crusades) at the Palace of Versailles. The painting, Matthieu de Clermont défend Ptolémaïs en 1291, by French artist Dominique Papety (1815–1849) is displayed in the fourth room of the hall. Note that nineteenth century historians frequently referred to Acre as Ptolémaïs.

=== The destruction of the remaining cities ===
The remaining Frankish cities soon met the same fate as Acre. On 19 May 1291, Khalil sent a large contingent of troops to Tyre, the strongest city on the coast. A few months earlier Margaret of Tyre had handed the city over to her nephew Amalric of Tyre. Its garrison was small and the city was abandoned without a struggle. At Sidon, the Templars decided to put up a defense. Thibaud Gaudin, installed as grand master after the death of Guillaume de Beaujeu, remained there with the Templar's treasure. Within a month, a large Mamluk army approached, causing the knights and citizens to relocate to the Castle of the Sea, a hundred yards from shore and recently refortified. Gaudin left for Cyprus to get assistance, but once he was there he did nothing, either from cowardice or despair. The Mamluk engineers built a causeway to the island, and the Templars gave up hope and sailed to Tortosa. On 14 July 1291, the Mamluks took the castle and ordered its destruction. Within a week, the Mamluks approached Beirut, where the citizens had hoped that the treaty between Eschive of Ibelin and the sultan would save them. When the leaders of the garrison were summoned to pay their respects, they were imprisoned. Those that remained fled to their ships, carrying with them sacred relics. The city was entered on 31 July 1291, its walls and the Castle of the Ibelins partially destroyed, and the cathedral turned into a mosque.

Christian resistance in the Holy Land vanished. Within a month, the last outposts at Tyre, Beirut and Sidon had been abandoned by the Franks. That August, the Templars withdrew from their strongholds at Tortosa and Château Pèlerin. The Mamluks ravaged the coastal lands, destroying anything of value to the Franks should they ever attempt another attack. The only major castles that were left standing were Mount Pilgrim and Margat. Embittered by the long religious wars, the victorious Muslims had no mercy for the Christians. Those that escaped to Cyprus did not fare much better, living lives as unwanted refugees, and as the years passed sympathy for them wore thin. They only served to remind the Cypriots of the terrible disaster. With this, the Franks' reign over Outremer was over.

== The last battles ==
The Mamluks occupied Haifa without opposition on 30 July 1291 and destroyed the monasteries on Mount Carmel and slew their monks. There remained two Templar castles in the region, but in neither strong enough to withstand the Mamluks, and Tortosa was evacuated on 3 August and Château Pèlerin on the 14 August. All that was left to the Templars was their island fortress at Ruad, two miles off Tortosa. There they maintained their hold for twelve more years, only quitting the island in 1302, when the whole future of the Order began to be in doubt.

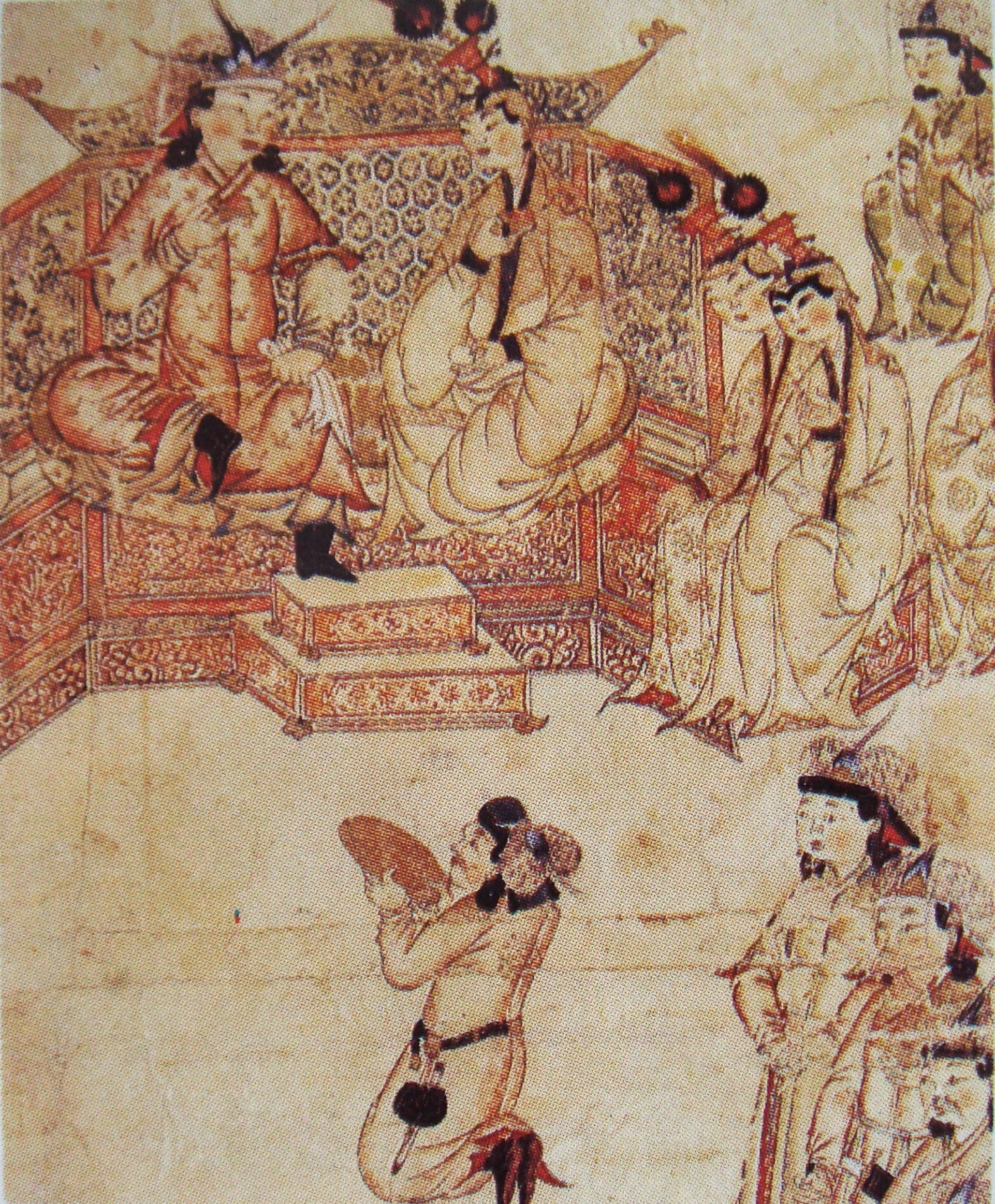
Ghazan, the Mongol ruler of the Ilkhanate, sought a Franco-Mongol alliance.

When Nicholas IV learned of the fall of Acre, he wrote to Arghun, asking him to be baptized and to fight against the Mamluks. But Arghun had died on 10 March 1291, followed by Nicholas on 4 April 1292, effectively ending their efforts towards combined action. Then, Mamluk sultan Khalil was assassinated on 14 December 1293. Nicholas was succeeded by Celestine V after a two-year papal election, resigning five months later. He was then succeeded by Boniface VIII who would serve as pope from 1296 to 1303. As Ilkhan, Arghun was followed in rapid succession by his half-brother Gaykhatu and then cousin Baydu. Stability was restored when Arghun's son Ghazan took power in 1295, who converted to Islam to secure cooperation from other influential Mongols. Despite being a Muslim, Ghazan maintained good relations with his Christian vassal states including Cilician Armenia and Georgia. Khalil was succeeded by his brother an-Nasir Muhammad in December 1293.

=== Ghazan ===
In 1299, Ghazan made the first of three attempts to invade Syria. As he launched his invasion, he sent letters to Henry II and the Grand Masters of the military orders inviting them to join him in his attack on the Mamluks in Syria. The Mongols successfully took the city of Aleppo, and were there joined by their vassal Hethum II of Armenia, whose forces participated in the rest of the offensive. The Mongols soundly defeated the Mamluks in the Third Battle of Homs (Battle of Wadi al-Khazandar) on 23 December 1299. The success in Syria led to rumors in Europe that the Mongols had successfully recaptured the Holy Land. But Jerusalem had been neither taken nor even besieged. There were some Mongol raids into Palestine in early 1300 going as far as Gaza. When the Egyptians advanced from Cairo in May 1300, the Mongols retreated without resistance.

In 1303, they suffered a crushing defeat at the Battle of Marj al-Saffar, which marked the end of their incursions into Syria. Ghazan died on 11 May 1304 and was succeeded by his brother Öljaitü. In 1312, Öljaitü decided to cross the Euphrates to attack the Mamluks. He laid siege to the heavily fortified town of Rahbat. After about a month of fighting in which they suffered heavy casualties, the Mongols ultimately failed to take the fortified place and withdrew. This was to be the last major Mongol incursion into the Levant.

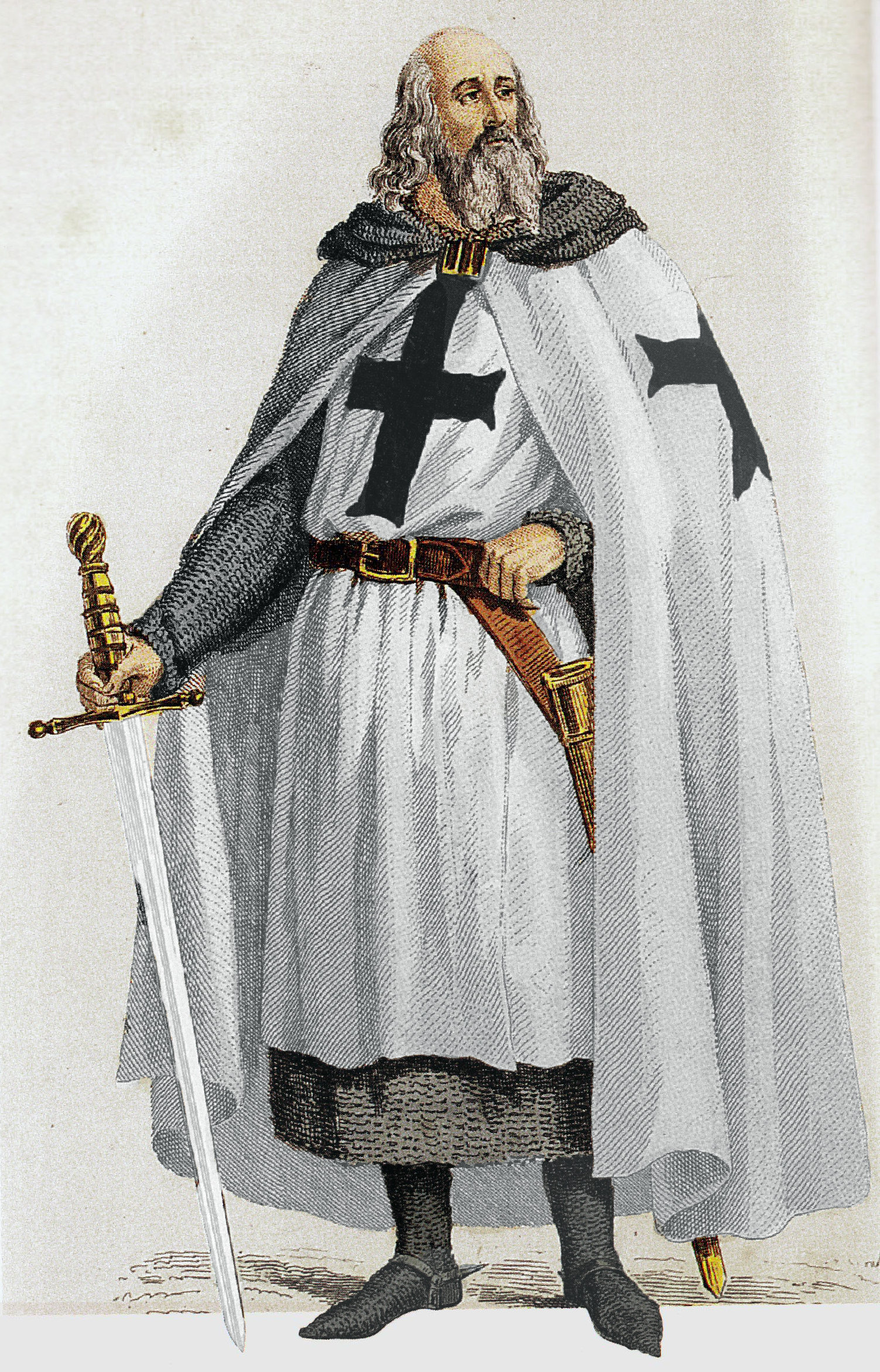
Templar Grand Master Jacques de Molay, put to death in 1314

=== Counterattack at Tortosa ===
Following the death of Guillaume de Beaujeu at Acre, Thibaud Gaudin briefly served as Templar grand master before the election of Jacques de Molay, who had been marshall, in 1292. De Molay was not only the best known of the Templars, he was to be the last grand master. In 1300, Molay and other forces from Cyprus put together a small fleet of sixteen ships which committed raids along the Egyptian and Syrian coasts. The force was commanded by Henry II and accompanied by Amalric of Tyre and the heads of the military orders, with the ambassador of the Mongol leader Ghazan also in attendance. The ships left Famagusta on 20 July 1300 and raided the port cities of Egypt and Syria before returning to Cyprus.

Tortosa was the most likely stronghold which had the potential to be recaptured. The first phase was to establish a bridgehead on island of Ruad where they could launch raids on the city. In November 1300, Jacques de Molay and Amalric launched the expedition to reoccupy Tortosa. Six hundred troops, including about 150 Templars, were ferried to Ruad in preparation for a seaborne assault on the city. In conjunction with the naval assault, there would also be a land-based attack by Ghazan's forces planned. The attack on Tortosa lasted only twenty-five days, with the Franks acting more like plunderers, destroying property and taking captives. They did not stay permanently in the city, but set up base on Ruad. Ghazan's Mongols did not show up as planned, being delayed by the winter weather. In February 1301, the Mongols commanded by general Kutlushka, accompanied by forces of Hethum II of Armenia, finally made their advance into Syria. The Armenian force also included Guy of Ibelin and Jean II de Giblet. While commanding an impressive force of 60,000, Kutlushka could do little else than engage in minor raids raiding in the environs of Aleppo. When Ghazan canceled his operations for the year, the Franks returned to Cyprus, leaving only a garrison on Ruad.

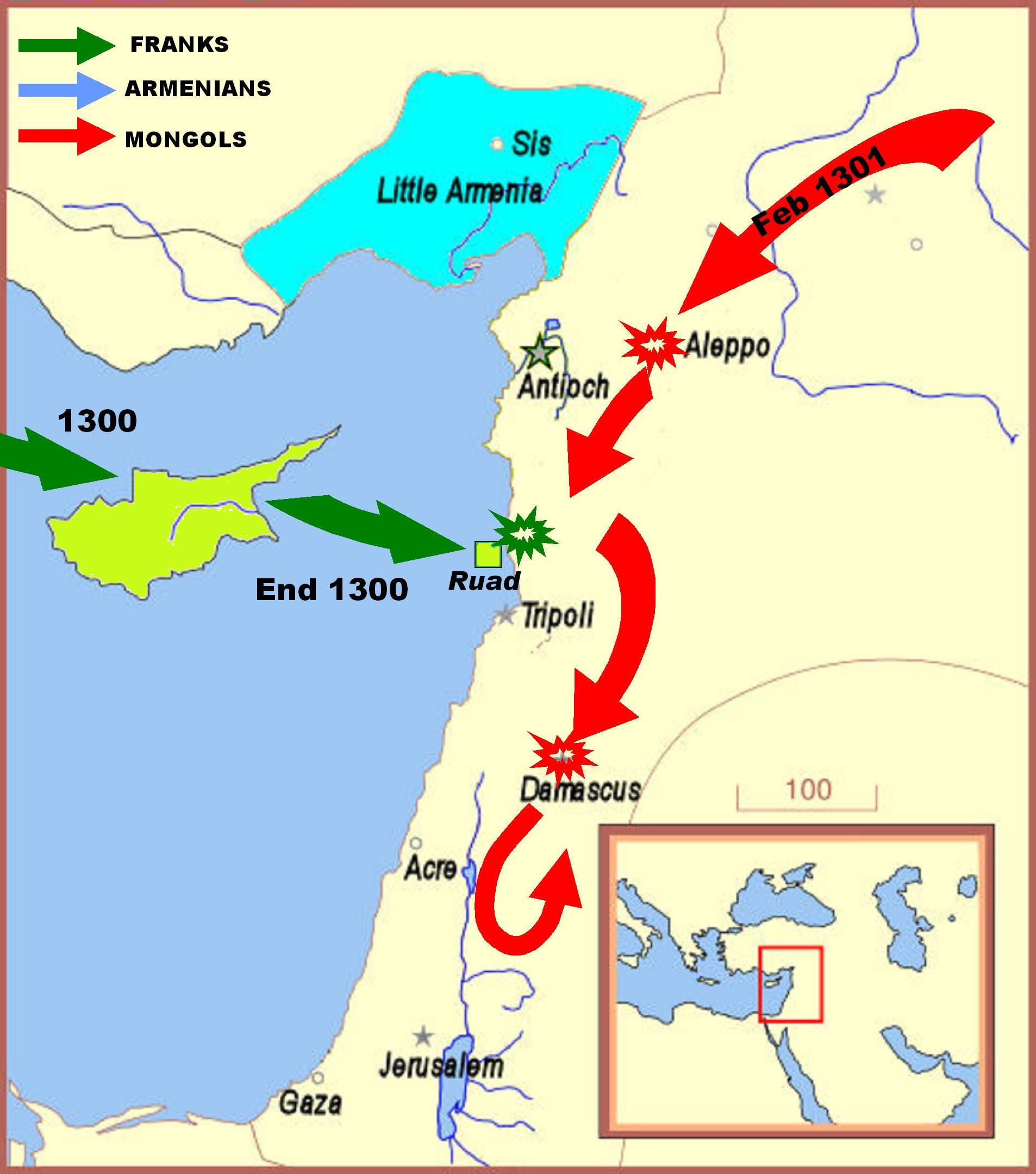
European and Mongol offensive near Tortosa and Ruad

=== Siege of Ruad ===
Jacques de Molay continued to appeal to the West for troops and supplies to fortify the island. In November 1301, Boniface VIII granted Ruad to the Templars, where they strengthened its fortifications, and installed a small force as a permanent garrison. They were under the command of the marshal Barthélemy de Quincy. Plans for combined operations between the Franks and the Mongols were made for the winters of 1301 and 1302.

In 1302, the Mamluks sent a fleet to Tripoli where they began the Siege of Ruad. The Templars fought hard against the invaders, but were eventually starved out. The Cypriots began assembling a fleet to rescue Ruad, but it arrived too late. The Templars surrendered on 26 September 1302, with the understanding that they could depart unharmed. However, most were executed, and the surviving Templar knights were taken as prisoners to Cairo, eventually dying of starvation after years of ill treatment.

== Aftermath ==
In the 19th century, false stories circulated that Jacques de Molay and the Templars had captured Jerusalem in 1300. These rumors are probably related to the fact that the Gestes des Chiprois wrote about the Mongol general Mulay who occupied Syria and Palestine for a few months in early 1300. The confusion was enhanced in 1805, when the French playwright and historian François Raynouard made claims that Jerusalem had been captured by the Mongols, with Molay in command of one of the Mongol divisions. This story of wishful thinking was so popular in France that in 1846, a large-scale painting was created by Claude Jacquand titled Molay Prend Jerusalem, 1299, which depicts the supposed event. Today the painting hangs in the Salles des Croisades at Versailles.

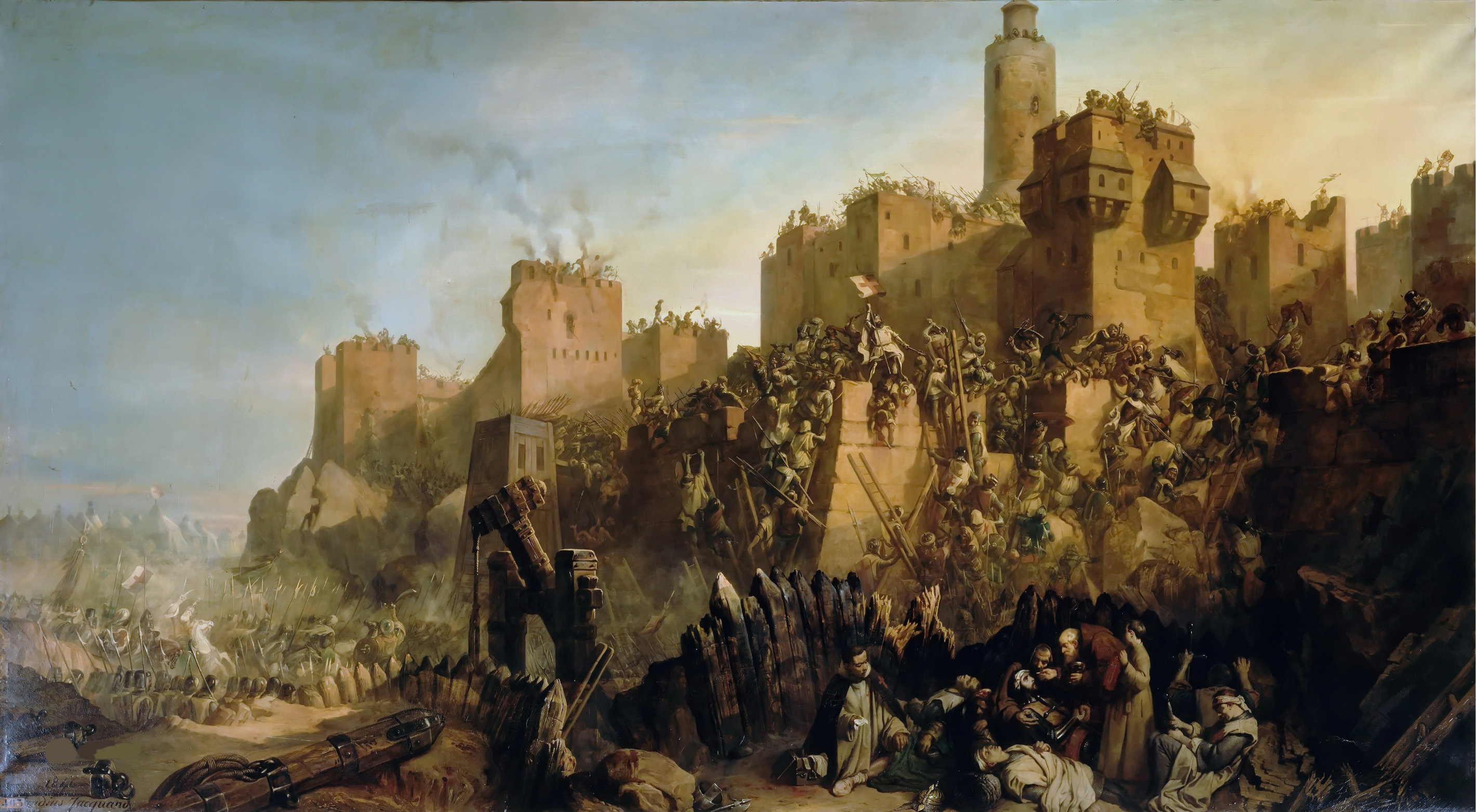
"The capture of Jerusalem by Jacques de Molay in 1299", by Claudius Jacquand.

Boniface VIII died on 11 October 1303 and was succeeded first by Benedict XI and then Clement V, who assumed the papacy on 5 June 1305. Öljaitü sent letters to Philip IV, the pope, and Edward I again offering a military collaboration between the Christian nations of Europe and the Mongols against the Mamluks. European nations discussed another Crusade but were delayed, and it never took place. Edward I of England died on 7 July 1307 and was succeeded by his son Edward II of England. On 11 August 1308, Clement proclaimed a Hospitaller passagium particulare in what became known as the Crusade of the Poor. Early in 1310, a fleet departed eastward under the leadership of Foulques de Villaret. Rather than go to the Holy Land, it sailed for the island of Rhodes. The Crusader army facilitated the Hospitaller conquest of Rhodes in August 1310.

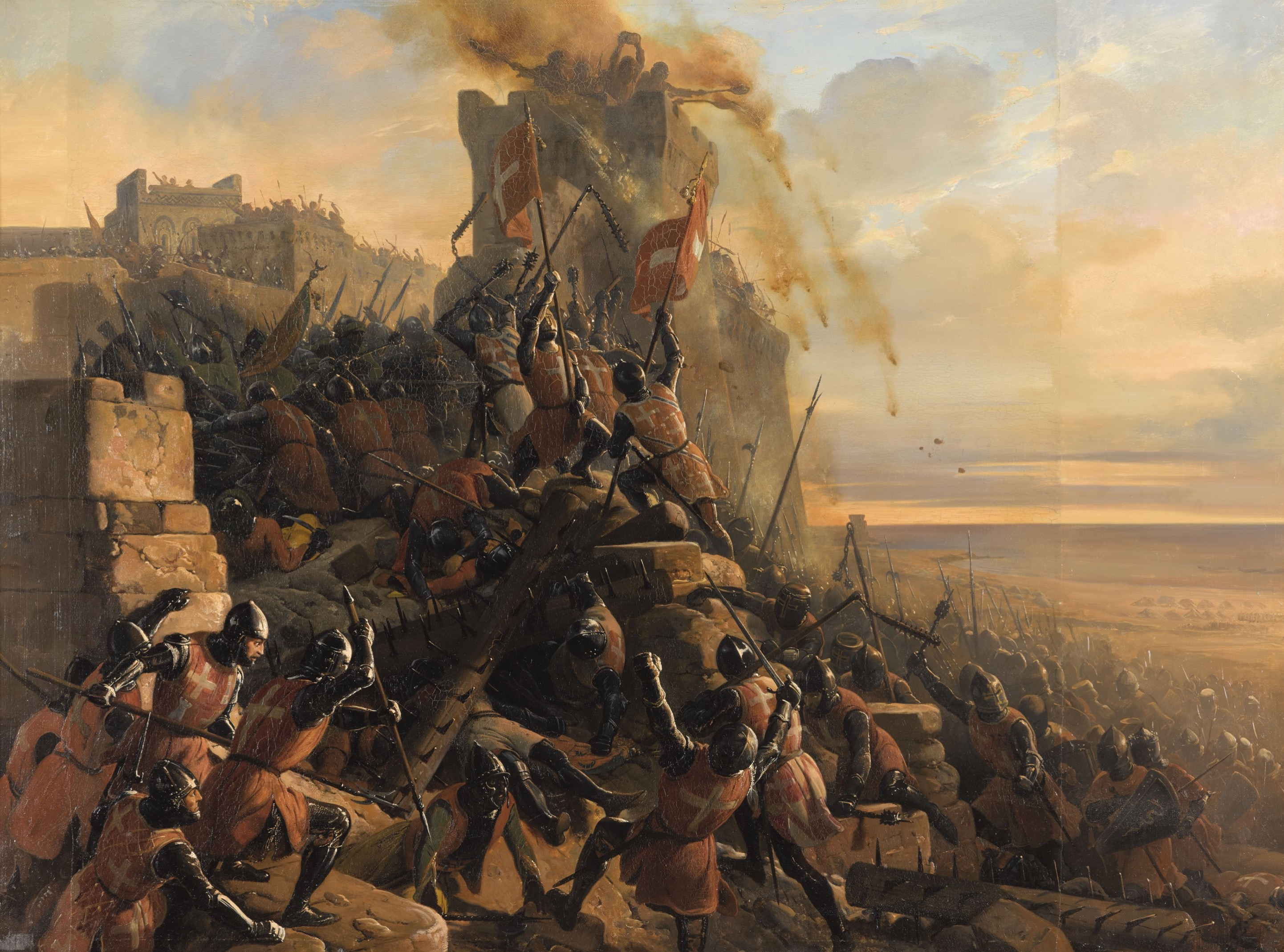
Prise de Rhodes, 15 août 1310 (oil on canvas by Éloi Firmin Féron).

On 4 April 1312, another Crusade was promulgated at the Council of Vienne where, in order to placate Philip IV, the Templars were condemned and their wealth in France give to him. On 13 October 1307, Philip ordered an arrest of all Templars in France and on 22 November, Clement V, under pressure from the King, issued the papal decree Pastoralis praceminentiae ordering the arrest of all Templars and the confiscation of their lands. Despite the papal request, not all the monarchs complied immediately, including Edward II of England who at first refused to believe the allegations, but later carried out the order. Their 1308 trial was called for in the bull Faciens misericordiam. The knights were tortured into giving false confessions, and then many were burned at the stake. Clement V disbanded the order in 1312. Even though Jacques de Molay later retracted his confession, he and Geoffroi de Charney were sentenced to death. They were burned at the stake on 11 March 1314. Philip IV, having taken the cross the year before, died on 29 November 1314 before he could depart on his crusade.

== Historiography ==
The principal work that chronicling the fall of Outremer is Les Gestes des Chiprois (Deeds of the Cypriots), by an unknown historian referred to as Templar of Tyre. Gestes is an Old French chronicle of the history of the Crusader states and Kingdom of Cyprus between 1132–1309 and was based on previous and original sources, and was completed in 1315–1320. The work includes an eyewitness account of the fall of Acre in 1291, the deeds of Hospitaller Matthew of Clermont, and the Trial of the Knights Templar in 1311. Other Western histories include:

- Francesco Amadi (died after 1445) was an Italian chronicler whose Chroniques d'Amadi et de Stromboldi covers the Crusades from 1095 and a history of Cyprus through 1441.
- Fidentius of Padua (before 1226 – after 1291) was a Franciscan friar and historian who published Liber recuperations Terre Sancte, a history of the Holy Land and approaches to retaking the Kingdom of Jerusalem, delivered to Pope Nicholas IV.
- Thaddeus of Naples (fl. 1291) wrote Hystoria de desolacione civitatis Acconensis based on eyewitness accounts of the fall of Acre of 1291. It is supplemented by the De excidio urbis Acconis, an anonymous account of the siege of Acre.
- Guigliemo of Santo Stefano (fl. c. 1278 – 1303) wrote the first complete history of the Knights Hospitaller after the fall of Acre in 1291.
- Riccoldo da Monte di Croce (c. 1243 – 1320) was an Italian Dominican friar, travel writer, missionary, and Christian apologist who wrote Letters on the Fall of Acre, five letters in the form of lamentations over the fall of Acre, written about 1292.
- De Excidio Urbis Acconis (Destruction of the City of Acre) is an anonymous account of the siege of Acre of 1291, with earlier material based on William of Tyre's Historia. De Excidio presents a more popular view (as opposed to nobleman) of the history and of the Knights Hospitaller's last stand. The work takes a dim view of the Knights Templar and, in particular, Otto de Grandson, master of the English knights at Acre. The criticism of Grandson is entirely contradicted by the eyewitness account of the Gestes des Chiprois and should be treated sceptically.

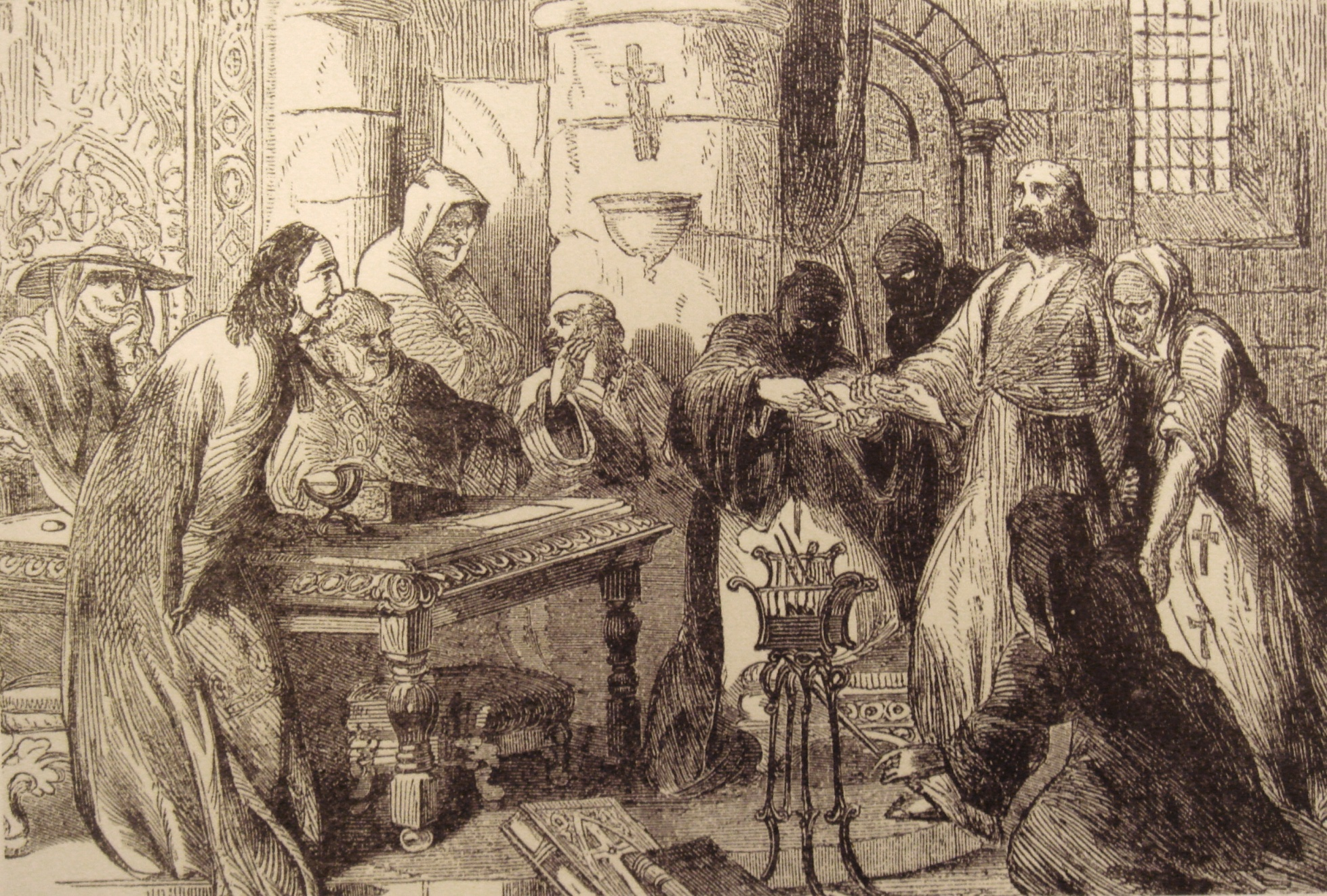
Interrogation of Jacques de Molay at the Trial of the Templars. 19th century print

Other works include those from Arabic, Persian, Mongolian and Armenian sources.

- Abu'l-Fida (1273–1331) was a Kurdish politician, geographer and historian from Syria who had descended from Najm ad-Din Ayyub, father of Saladin. He wrote numerous works including Tarikh al-Mukhtasar fi Akhbar al-Bashar (Concise History of Humanity), a history called An Abridgment of the History at the Human Race, a continuation of ibn al-Athir's The Complete History, through 1329, and texts Taqwim al-Buldan (A Sketch of the Countries) and Kunash, concerning geography and medicine, respectively.
- Rashid-al-Din Hamadani (1247–1318) was a Jewish-turned-Islamic physician and historian who was vizier to the Ilkhan Ghazan. His Jāmiʿ al-Tawārīkh (Compendium of Chronicles) is a history of the Mongols from the time of Adam until 1311. The books include History of the Mongols, regarding the Khanate conquests from Genghis Khan through that of Ghazan. They also include the History of the Franks through 1305, based on sources such as Italian explorer Isol the Pisan and the Chronicon pontificum et imperatorum of Martin of Opava. A third part on geography has been lost.
- The Secret History of the Mongols by Yuan Ch'ao Pi Shih is the oldest surviving literary work in Mongolian, describing the history of the Mongols from 1241. The work was discovered by Russian sinologist Palladius Kafarov and first translations by Erich Haenisch and later Paul Pelliot.
- Hayton of Corycus (1240–1310/1320), also known as Hethum of Gorigos, was an Armenian noble and historian whose La Flor des estoires de la terre d'Orient (Flower of the Histories of the East) concerns the Muslim conquests and Mongol invasion.

Several travelogues, letters from the Holy Land and other artifacts are also relevant.

- Rabban Bar Ṣawma (1220–1289) was a Turkic monk who travelled from Mongol-controlled China to Jerusalem from 1287 to 1288 and recorded his activities in The Monks of Kublai Khan, Emperor of China, translated by E. A. W. Budge. He also wrote a biography of his traveling companion Nestorian Yahballaha III.
- Burchard of Mount Sion (fl. 1283) was a German friar who took a pilgrimage to the Holy Land from 1274 to 1284 and documented his travels in Descriptio Terrae Sanctae (Description of the Holy Land), one of the last detailed accounts prior to 1291. Burchard traveled to Cyprus and was received by Henry II of Jerusalem and later prepared a plan for an eventual crusade to retake Jerusalem.
- Marco Polo (1254–1324) was an Italian explorer who traveled in Asia from Persia to China in 1271–1295. He documented his exploits in The Travels of Marco Polo.
- Joseph of Chauncy (before 1213 – after 1283), Prior of the English Hospitallers, wrote to Edward I of England concerning the activities of Hugh III of Cyprus and Bohemond VII of Antioch following the Second Battle of Homs in 1281.
- Jean de Villiers (fl. 6 July 1269 – 1293), Grand Master of the Hospitallers, wrote a letter to Europe following the siege of Acre in 1291 trying to explain the loss of the city to the Mamluks. The letter recounts the story of Hospitaller Marshall Matthew of Clermont, who leapt into the midst of the Mamluks causing them to flee like "sheep from wolves". This story is also told in De Excidio Urbis Acconis, Thaddeus of Naples' Hystoria de desolacione civitatis Acconensis, and Gestes des Chiprois.
- Chinon Parchment, dated 17–20 August 1308, claiming that Clement V absolved Jacques de Molay, and the rest of the leadership of the Knights Templar from charges brought against them by the Inquisition.

== See also ==
- Chronology of the Crusades, 1187–1291
- Criticism of crusading
- Crusader states
- Franco-Mongol alliance
- History of the Knights Hospitaller in the Levant
- History of the Knights Templar
- Hospitaller conquest of Rhodes
- Kingdom of Acre, 1192–1291
- Kisrawan campaigns (1292–1305)
- Mongol invasions of the Levant
- Mongol raids into Palestine

== Bibliography ==
- Amitai-Preiss, Reuven (1995). Mongols and Mamluks: the Mamluk-Īlkhānid War, 1260–1281. Cambridge University Press. ISBN 9780521462266.
- Asbridge, Thomas (2012). The Crusades: The War for the Holy Land. Simon & Schuster. ISBN 9781849836883.
- Baldwin, Philip Bruce (2014). Pope Gregory X and the Crusades. Boydell & Brewer Ltd. ISBN 9781843839163.
- Barber, Malcolm (2006). The Trial of the Templars. Cambridge University Press. ISBN 9781139458429.
- Borbone, Pier Giorgio (2021). History of Mar Yahballaha and Rabban Sauma. tredition. ISBN 9783749712984.
- Bosworth, Clifford Edmund (2004). The New Islamic dynasties: A Chronological and Genealogical Manual. Edinburgh University Press. ISBN 9780748621378.
- Bouchier, Edmund Spenser (1921). A Short History of Antioch, 300 B.C. – A.D. 1268. B. Blackwell, Oxford.
- Cahen, Claude (1969). The Mongols and the Near East (PDF). A History of the Crusades (Setton), Volume II.
- Chaytor, Henry John (1933). A History of Aragon and Catalonia. Methuen. ISBN 9780404014797.
- Crowley, Roger (2019). The Accursed Tower: The Fall of Acre and the End of the Crusades. Basic Books. ISBN 9781541697348.
- Delaville Le Roulx, Joseph (1904). Les Hospitaliers en Terre Sainte et à Chypre (1100–1310). E. Leroux, Paris.
- Demurger, Alain (2009). The Last Templar: The Tragedy of Jacques de Molay. Profile Books. ISBN 9781846682247.
- Dunbabin, Jean (1998). Charles I of Anjou: Power, Kingship and State-Making in Thirteenth-Century Europe. Bloomsbury. ISBN 9781780937670.
- Edbury, Peter W. (1991). The Kingdom of Cyprus and the Crusades, 1191–1374. Cambridge University Press. ISBN 9780521268769.
- Frale, Barbara (2011). The Templars: The Secret History Revealed. Arcade. ISBN 9781611450194.
- "Selected Sources: The Crusades - The Fall of the Latin East". Fordham.edu. Fordham University.
- Furber, Elizabeth Chapin (1969). The Kingdom of Cyprus, 1191–1291 (PDF). A History of the Crusades (Setton), Volume II. Archived from the original (PDF) on 26 March 2023.
- Geanakoplos, Deno John (1959). Emperor Michael Palaeologus and the West, 1258–1282: A Study in Byzantine-Latin Relations. Harvard University Press. ISBN 9781258023911.
- Grousset, René (1934). Histoire des croisades et du royaume franc de Jérusalem. Plon, Paris.
- Grousset, René (1935). L'Épopée des croisades. Le Club français du livre. Histoire,38. Paris: le Club français du livre.
- Grousset, René (1970). The Empire of the Steppes: A History of Central Asia. Translated by Naomi Walford. Rutgers University Press. ISBN 9780813513041.
- Holt, Peter Malcom (1995). Early Mamluk Diplomacy, 1260–1290: Treaties of Baybars and Qalāwūn with Christian Rulers. E. J. Brill, New York. ISBN 9789004102460.
- Howarth, Stephen (1982). Knights Templar. Marboro Books, New York. ISBN 9780002164528.
- Irwin, Robert (1986). The Middle East in the Middle Ages: The Early Mamluk Sultanate, 1250–1382. Southern Illinois University Press. ISBN 9781597400480.
- Jackson, Peter (2005). The Mongols and the West: 1221–1410. Pearson Longman. ISBN 9780582368965.
- Lane, George (2003). Early Mongol Rule in Thirteenth-Century Iran: A Persian Renaissance. Routledge. ISBN 9781134431038.
- Lane-Poole, Stanley (1901). History of Egypt in the Middle Ages. A History of Egypt; v. 6. Methuen, London. ISBN 9780790532042.
- Lewis, Bernard (1969). The Isma'ites and the Assassins (PDF). A History of the Crusades (Setton), Volume II.
- Lewis, Bernard (2003). The Assassins: A Radical Sect in Islam. Phoenix. ISBN 9781842124512.
- Lock, Peter (2006). The Routledge Companion to the Crusades. Routledge. doi:10.4324/9780203389638. ISBN 0-415-39312-4.
- Luttrell, Anthony T. (1975). The Hospitallers at Rhodes, 1306–1421 (PDF). A History of the Crusades (Setton), Volume III.
- Maalouf, Amin (2006). The Crusades through Arab Eyes. Saqi Books. ISBN 9780863560231.
- Murray, Alan V. (2006). The Crusades—An Encyclopedia. ABC-CLIO. ISBN 9781576078624.
- Nicolle, David (2005). Acre 1291: Bloody Sunset of the Crusader States. Bloomsbury USA. ISBN 9781841768625.
- Northrup, Linda (1998). From Slave to Sultan: The Career of Al-Manṣūr Qalāwūn and the Consolidation of Mamluk Rule in Egypt and Syria (678–689 A.H./1279–1290 A.D.). Franz Steiner Verlag, Stuttgart. ISBN 9783515068611.
- Richard, Jean C. (1979). The Latin Kingdom of Jerusalem. Amsterdam, North Holland. ISBN 9780444852625.
- Richard, Jean C. (1999). The Crusades, c. 1071 – c. 1291. Cambridge University Press. ISBN 9780521625661.
- Riley-Smith, Jonathan (2012). The Knights Hospitaller in the Levant, c. 1070 – 1309. Palgrave Macmillan. ISBN 9780230290839.
- Roux, Jean-Paul (1993). Histoire de l'Empire mongol. Fayard. ISBN 9782213031644.
- Runciman, Steven (1954). A History of the Crusades, Volume Three: The Kingdom of Acre and the Later Crusades. Cambridge University Press. ISBN 9780521347723.
- Runciman, Steven (1958). The Sicilian Vespers: A History of the Mediterranean World in the Later Thirteenth Century. Cambridge University Press. ISBN 9781107604742.
- Runciman, Steven (1969). The Crusader States, 1243–1291 (PDF). A History of the Crusades (Setton), Volume II. Archived from the original (PDF) on 18 October 2021.
- Schein, Sylvia (1991). Fideles Crucis: The Papacy, the West, and the Recovery of the Holy Land, 1274–1314. Clarendon Press. ISBN 9780198221654.
- Setton, Kenneth M. (1969). A History of the Crusades. University of Wisconsin Press.
- Setton, Kenneth M. (1976). The Papacy and the Levant, 1204–1571, Volume I: The thirteenth and fourteenth centuries. American Philosophical Society. ISBN 9780871691149.
- Siberry, Elizabeth (1985). Criticism of Crusading, 1095–1274. Clarendon Press. ISBN 9780198219538.
- Stewart, Angus Donal (2001). The Armenian Kingdom and the Mamluks. Brill. ISBN 9789004122925.
- Throop, Palmer A. (1975). Criticism of the Crusade: A Study of Public Opinion and Crusade Propaganda. Porcupine Press. ISBN 9780879916183.
- Tyerman, Christopher (2006). God's War: A New History of the Crusades. Belknap Press. ISBN 9780674023871.
- Waterson, James (2007). The Knights of Islam: The Wars of the Mamluks. London: Greenhill Books. ISBN 9781853677342.
- Wolff, Robert Lee (1969). The Latin Empire of Constantinople, 1204–1312 (PDF). A History of the Crusades (Setton), Volume II. Archived from the original (PDF) on 26 March 2023.
- Ziyādaẗ, Muḥammad Muṣṭafā (1969). The Mamluk Sultans to 1293 (PDF). A History of the Crusades (Setton), Volume II. Archived from the original (PDF) on 14 June 2020.
