= Jean II de Giblet =

Jean II de Giblet (died 1315) was a Christian prince of the House of Giblet, an area of the Holy Land, in the 13th-14th century. His family used to be located in the fief of Cerep in Antioch, before the area was taken by the Mamluks. He was married to Marguerite du Plessis.

Jean de Giblet is recorded as witness in a contract signed with Venice by Amalric de Lusignan, Lord of Tyre and governor of Cyprus.

He is mentioned by the medieval historian, the Templar of Tyre:

That year [1300], a message came to Cyprus from Ghazan, king of the Tatars, saying that he would come during the winter, and that he wished that the Frank join him in Armenia (...) Amalric of Lusignan, Constable of the Kingdom of Jerusalem, arrived in November (...) and brought with him 300 knights, and as many or more of the Templars and Hospitallers (...) In February a great admiral of the Tatars, named Cotlesser, came to Antioch with 60,000 horsemen, and requested the visit of the king of Armenia, who came with Guy of Ibelin, Count of Jaffa, and John, lord of Giblet. And when they arrived, Cotelesse told them that Ghazan had met great trouble of wind and cold on his way. Cotlesse raided the land from Haleppo to La Chemelle, and returned to his country without doing more.

— Le Templier de Tyre, Chap 620-622

In early 1300, Jean and Guy d'Ibelin had moved in with their troops from Cyprus in response to an earlier call by the Mongol leader Ghazan to reoccupy the Holy Land. They established a base in the castle of Nefin in Gibelet on the Syrian coast with the intention of joining Ghazan, but he had already retreated at that point. They attempted to besiege the new city of Tripoli, but in vain, and soon had to reembark for Cyprus.
