= Barthélémy de Maraclée =

Barthélémy de Maraclée was Lord of Maraclea, also known as Khrab Marqiya, a small coastal Crusader town and a castle in the Levant, between Tortosa and Baniyas (Buluniyas).

In 1271, the city of Maraclea was destroyed by the Mamluks. Barthélémy, one of the vassals of Bohemond VI, is recorded as having fled from the Mamluk offensive, taking refuge in Persia at the Mongol Court of Abagha, where he exhorted the Mongols to intervene in the Holy Land.

In 1285, Qalawun blackmailed Bohemond VII into destroying the last fortifications of the area, where Barthélémy was entrenched, a square tower which had been erected some distance from the shore. Qalawun said he would besiege Tripoli if the Maraclea fort was not dismantled.
