= Bartholomew Mansel =

Bishop of Tortosa

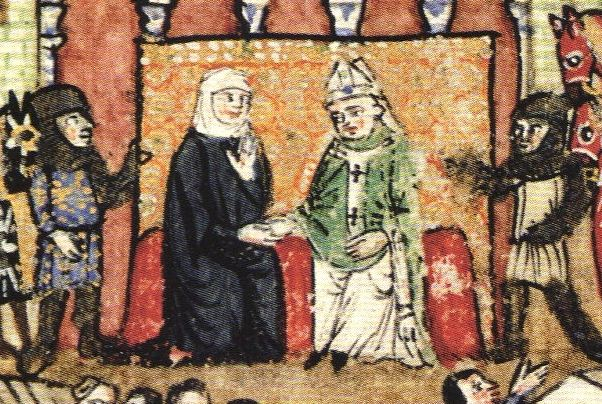
Bishop of Tortosa Bartholomew with Lucia of Tripoli during the fall of Tripoli

Bartholomew Mansel was the vicar of the diocese of Antioch, regent of Tripoli, and bishop of Tortosa around 1272, a post he held until 1291.

== Biography ==
Bartholomew belonged to the important Frankish family of the Mansels in Antioch. He was probably the son of Robert Mansel, who was Constable of Antioch in 1207. Simon Mansel, Constable of Antioch, was probably his brother. He was maternally related to King Hethum I, as his father married his half-sister.

In 1268, Bartholomew escaped the sack of Antioch, which was under the command of his brother Simon. He was appointed bishop of Tortosa when that see fell vacant in 1272. After the death of Bohemond VI in 1275, his widow, Sibylla, invited Bishop Bartholomew to act as regent for her young son, Bohemond VII. Since Bartholomew was also the vicar of the absentee patriarch of Antioch, Opizo dei Fieschi, this brought him into conflict with the bishop of Tripoli Paul of Segni.

After he took up residence in Tripoli, Bartholomew, who outranked Paul both spiritually and secularly, sided with Paul's detractors among the native baronage. He also had a dispute with the Lord Guy II of Gibelet, which was provoked by the marriage of the heiress of Hugh l'Aleman to Guy's brother John, which preempted her marriage to Bartholomew's nephew.

Bartholomew, acting as patriarchal vicar, absolved Bohemond of the excommunication issued by Pope Nicholas III, following a letter from Paul to the Pope in which he accused Bohemond of seizing his goods, imprisoning his servants and attacking his safehouse.

He returned to Tortosa after the fall of Tripoli in 1289. On 3 August 1291, the Knight Templars and Bartholomew evacuated Tortosa, which had ceased to be a residential bishopric afterwards.

== Bibliography ==
- Hamilton, Bernard (1980). The Latin Church in the Crusader States: The Secular Church. Ashgate.
- Stratham, Edward Phillips (1917). History of the Family of Maunsell (Mansell, Mansel) (PDF). K. Paul.
