= Sibylla of Armenia =

Princess of Antioch and Countess of Tripoli
- Tenure: 1254–1275

Regent of the County of Tripoli
- Tenure: 1275–1277
- Died: 1290; Armenia
- Spouse: Bohemond VI of Antioch
- Issue: Bohemond VII of Antioch; Lucia, Countess of Tripoli; Maria
- House: Hethumids
- Father: Hethum I of Armenia
- Mother: Isabella, Queen of Armenia

Sibylla of Armenia (died in 1290) was the princess of Antioch and countess of Tripoli by marriage to Bohemond VI from 1254 to 1275, and then regent of the County of Tripoli until their son, Bohemond VII, came of age in 1277. She was closely allied with the bishop of Tortosa, Bartholomew Mansel, which frustrated the scheme to install her as ruler of Tripoli instead of her daughter Lucia after Bohemond VII's death in 1287. During her lifetime, both the principality and the county were lost to the Egyptian Mamluks.

== Early life ==
Sibylla was the daughter of Queen Isabella and King Hethoum I of Armenia. In 1254, at the suggestion of the crusader King Louis IX of France, Sibylla was married to Bohemond VI, the prince of Antioch and count of Tripoli. Their children were Bohemond VII, Lucia, and Maria.

The Principality of Antioch fell to the Egyptian Mamluks in 1268.

== Regent of Tripoli ==
Sibylla's husband, Bohemond VI, died in 1275, and their son, Bohemond VII, inherited the County of Tripoli. Since Bohemond VII was then a minor, Sibylla assumed government in his name as regent. She was challenged by King Hugh III of Cyprus, who claimed regency as the closest adult in the line of succession. But family custom and popular opinion were on the princess's side. She sent her son to the court of her brother King Leo II and appointed the bishop of Tortosa, Bartholomew Mansel, as her bailli. Hugh thus found no support.

Sibylla's husband, Bohemond VI, and Roman mother-in-law, Lucia of Segni, had installed Romans in important government posts, incurring the displeasure of the local nobility. The nobility thus supported Sibylla and Bartholomew when they dealt with the Romans through executions and banishments. They failed to remove Paul of Segni, who was Bohemond VI's uncle and bishop of Tripoli, due to his friendship with the Knights Templar. The Templars were thus hostile to Bohemond VII when he returned from Armenia to assume government in 1277.

== Claimant of Tripoli ==
Bohemond VII died childless on 19 October 1287. His heir was his sister, Sibylla's daughter, Lucia, who lived in Apulia with her husband, Narjot of Toucy, former admiral of Charles I of Anjou. The Angevins had meddled in the affairs of the Crusader states, trying to take over the Kingdom of Jerusalem from Hugh III of Cyprus, and had recently been ejected by Hugh III's son Henry II. Neither the nobility nor the citizens of Tripoli supported Lucia, who was hardly known to them and associated with the Angevins. They offered the county to Sibylla instead. She wrote to the bishop of Tripoli to ask him to be her bailli. The letter was intercepted and Sibylla was told by the nobles that he would not be accepted. Both sides refused to concede. The nobles and the merchants then proclaimed a commune, which was to rule Tripoli instead of counts. Sibylla then retired to her brother's court in Armenia. Her daughter came in 1288 and negotiated acceptance of her comital rights, but the Mamluks conquered Tripoli the next year. Sibylla died in Armenia in 1290.

== Sources ==
- Runciman, Steven (1989). A History of the Crusades, Volume III: The Kingdom of Acre and the Later Crusades. Cambridge University Press. ISBN 0-521-06163-6.
- Dédéyan, Gérard; Rizk, Karam (2010). Le Comté de Tripoli: Etat Multiculturel Et Multiconfessionnel (1102-1289) (in French). Geuthner. ISBN 270533839X.
