= Fall of Tripoli (1289) =

Capture of city in the Crusades by Egyptian Mamluks

Siege of Tripoli (1289)
- Part of The Crusades
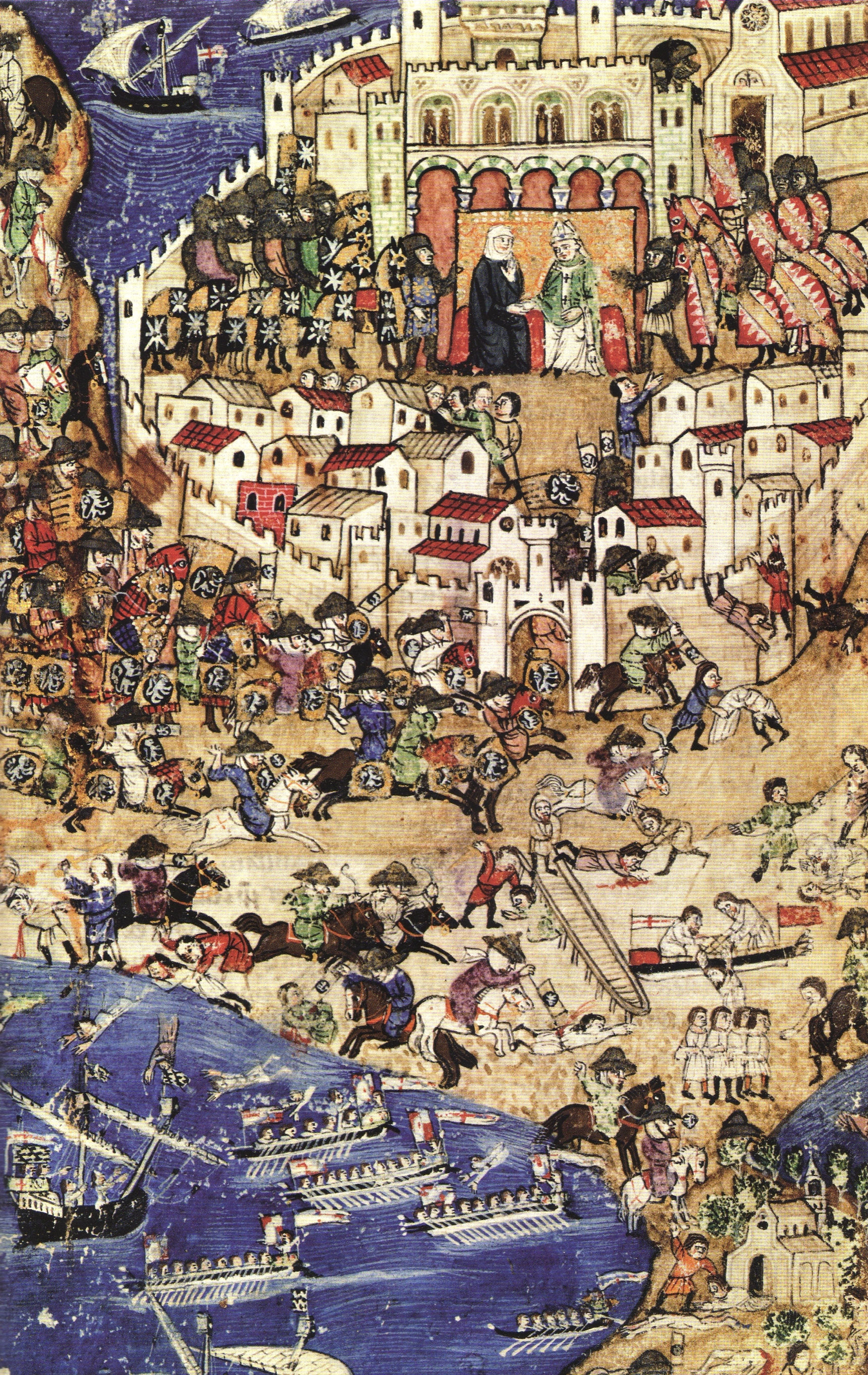
- The siege of Tripoli by the Mamluks in 1289.
Date	March – April 1289
Location	Tripoli and Tartus, present-day Lebanon and Syria
Result	Mamluk Sultanate victory
Territorial changes	Tripoli taken by the Mamluk Sultanate

Belligerents
Mamluk Sultanate	County of Tripoli; Knights Templar; Knights Hospitaller; Republic of Genoa

Commanders and leaders
Qalawun; Izz al-Din al-Kawrani; Al-Ashraf Khalil	Lucia of Tripoli; Geoffroy de Vandac; Matthew of Clermont; Amalric of Tyre; Jean de Grailly

The Fall of Tripoli was the capture and destruction of the Crusader state of the County of Tripoli (now parts of Lebanon and Syria) by the Mamluk Sultanate of Egypt. The battle occurred in 1289 and was an important event in the Crusades, as it marked the capture of one of the few remaining major Crusader possessions.

The event is depicted in a rare surviving illustration from a now-fragmentary manuscript known as the 'Cocharelli Codex', thought to have been created in Genoa in the 1330s. The image shows Lucia, Countess of Tripoli and Bartholomew Mansel, Bishop of Tortosa (granted the apostolic seat in 1278) sitting in state in the centre of the fortified city, and Qalawun's assault in 1289, with his army depicted massacring the inhabitants fleeing to boats in the harbour and to the nearby island of Saint Thomas (now Abdel Wahab Island, accessible by bridge in el Mina, Lebanon).

== Context ==
The County of Tripoli, though founded as a Crusader State and predominantly Christian, had been a vassal state of the Mongol Empire since around 1260, when Bohemond VI, under the influence of his father-in-law Hethum I, King of Armenia, preemptively submitted to the rapidly advancing Mongols. Tripoli had provided troops to the Mongols for the 1258 sack of Baghdad, as well as for the 1260 Mongol invasions of Syria, which caused even further friction with the Muslim world.

After the destruction of Baghdad and the capture of Damascus, which were the centers of the Abbasid and Ayyubid caliphates respectively, by the Khan Hulegu, Islamic power had shifted to the Egyptian Mamluks based in Cairo. Around the same time, the Mongols were slowed in their westward expansion by internal conflicts in their thinly spread Empire. The Mamluks took advantage of this to advance northwards from Egypt, and re-establish dominion over Palestine and Syria, pushing the Ilkhans back into Persia. The Mamluks attempted to take Tripoli in the 1271 siege, but were instead frustrated in their goal by the arrival of Prince Edward in Acre that month. They were persuaded to agree to a truce with both Tripoli and Prince Edward, although his forces had been too small to be truly effective.

The Mongols, for their part, had not proven to be staunch defenders of their vassal, the Christian state of Tripoli. Abaqa Khan, the ruler of the Ilkhanate, who had been sent envoys to Europe in an attempt to form a Franco-Mongol alliance against the Muslims, had died in 1282. He was succeeded by Tekuder, a convert to Islam. Under Tekuder's leadership, the Ilkhanate was not inclined to defend vassal Christian territories against Muslim encroachment. This enabled the Mamluks to continue their attacks against the remaining coastal cities which were still under Crusader control.

Tekuder was assassinated in 1284 and replaced by Abaqa's son Arghun, who was more sympathetic to Christianity. He continued his father's communications with Europe towards the possibility of forming an alliance, but still did not show much interest in protecting Tripoli. However, the Mamluks continued to expand their control, conquering Margat in 1285, and Lattakiah in 1287.

The Mamluk Sultan Qalawun still had an official truce with Tripoli, but the Christians afforded him an opportunity to break it. The Christian powers had been pursuing an unwise course. Rather than maintaining a united front against the Muslims, they had fallen into bickering among themselves. After Bohemond VII's premature death in 1287, his sister Lucia of Tripoli, living in Apulia with her husband Narjot de Toucy, rightfully should have succeeded him. Two other sisters, Isabelle (who died young) and Marie (m. Nicholas II of Saint Omer), had predeceased him. His mother Sibylla of Armenia however, attempted to reappoint the Bishop of Tortosa Bartholomew to rule on her behalf. According to the 'Templar of Tyre', the knights "learned that she was going to summon the bishop of Tortosa, with whom they had conflict and contention and great disagreement. ...They resolved not to tolerate this, and they went to the princess...and told her that the bishop was their enemy, and that they would not have him to rule over them at this time." Sibylla ultimately was unsuccessful because Lucia arrived to claim leadership.

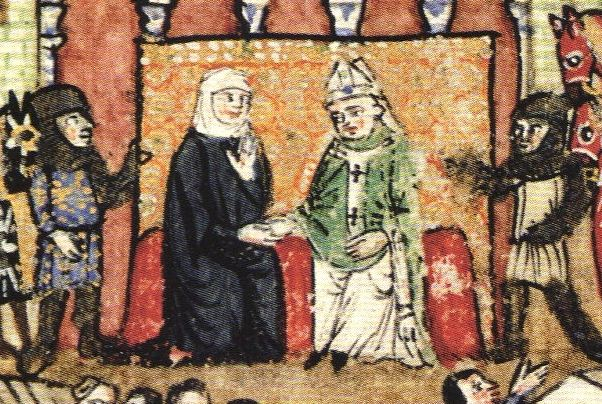
After Bohemond VII's death in 1287, his mother the dowager countess Sibylla of Armenia attempted to appoint the Bishop of Tortosa Bartholomew (pictured) to rule on her behalf.

The knights and barons united in 1288 to countermand the Bohemond family's dynastic claims and replace it with a republican style commune under the leadership of Bartholomew Embriaco of Gibelet, Lord of Besmedin in Byblos. They petitioned Genoa for support. The Genoese consuls agreed, on the condition that they receive larger quarters in the old part of Tripoli and increased residency privileges. Benedetto Zaccaria (c.1235–1307), an adroit Genoese merchant magnate was seconded to Tripoli to negotiate terms. Benedetto had no scruples about brokering secret and conflicting compacts. He persuaded Lucia to extend Genoa's concessions, on the threat, according to the Templar of Tyre, of bringing out fifty galleys from Genoa and assuming control himself. Bartholomew also secretly negotiated with Lucia, agreeing to recognise her title provided she accept the authority of the commune and not grant the Genoese any additional concessions. When the arrangements between Lucia and Benedetto became public, concern was voiced about the unfair advantage of Genoese maritime trading operations in the region. The 'Templar of Tyre' reports that "two people went down to Alexandria" to apprise the sultan that the Genoese, if left unchecked, would potentially dominate the Levant and obstruct or eliminate Mamluk trade: "the Genoese will pour into Tripoli from all sides; and if they hold Tripoli, they will rule the waves, and it will happen that those who will come to Alexandria will be at their mercy ... This thing bodes very ill for the merchants who operate in your kingdom". The communication produced an immediate effect. With an excuse to break his truce with Tripoli, Qalawun embarked on military preparations to attack Tripoli.

== Siege ==
Qalawun started the siege of Tripoli in March 1289, arriving with a sizable army and large catapults. In response, Tripoli's Commune and nobles gave supreme authority to Lucia. In the harbor at the time, there were four Genoese galleys, two Venetian galleys, and a few small boats, some of them Pisan. Reinforcements were sent to Tripoli by the Knights Templar, who sent a force under Geoffroy de Vandac, and the Hospitallers sent a force under Matthew of Clermont. A French regiment was sent from Acre under John of Grailly. King Henry II of Cyprus sent his young brother Amalric with a company of knights and four galleys. Many non-combatants fled to Cyprus.

The Mamluks fired their catapults, two towers soon crumbled under the bombardments, and the defenders hastily prepared to flee. The Mamluks overran the crumbling walls, and captured the city on 26 April, marking the end of an uninterrupted Christian rule of 180 years, the longest of any of the major Frankish conquests in the Levant. Lucia managed to flee to Cyprus, with two Marshals of the Orders and Almaric of Cyprus. The commander of the Temple Peter of Moncada was killed, as well as Bartholomew Embriaco. The population of the city was massacred, although many managed to escape by ship. Those who had taken refuge on the nearby island of Saint-Thomas were captured by the Mamluks on 29 April. Women and children were taken as slaves, and 1200 prisoners were sent to Alexandria to work in the Sultan's new arsenal.

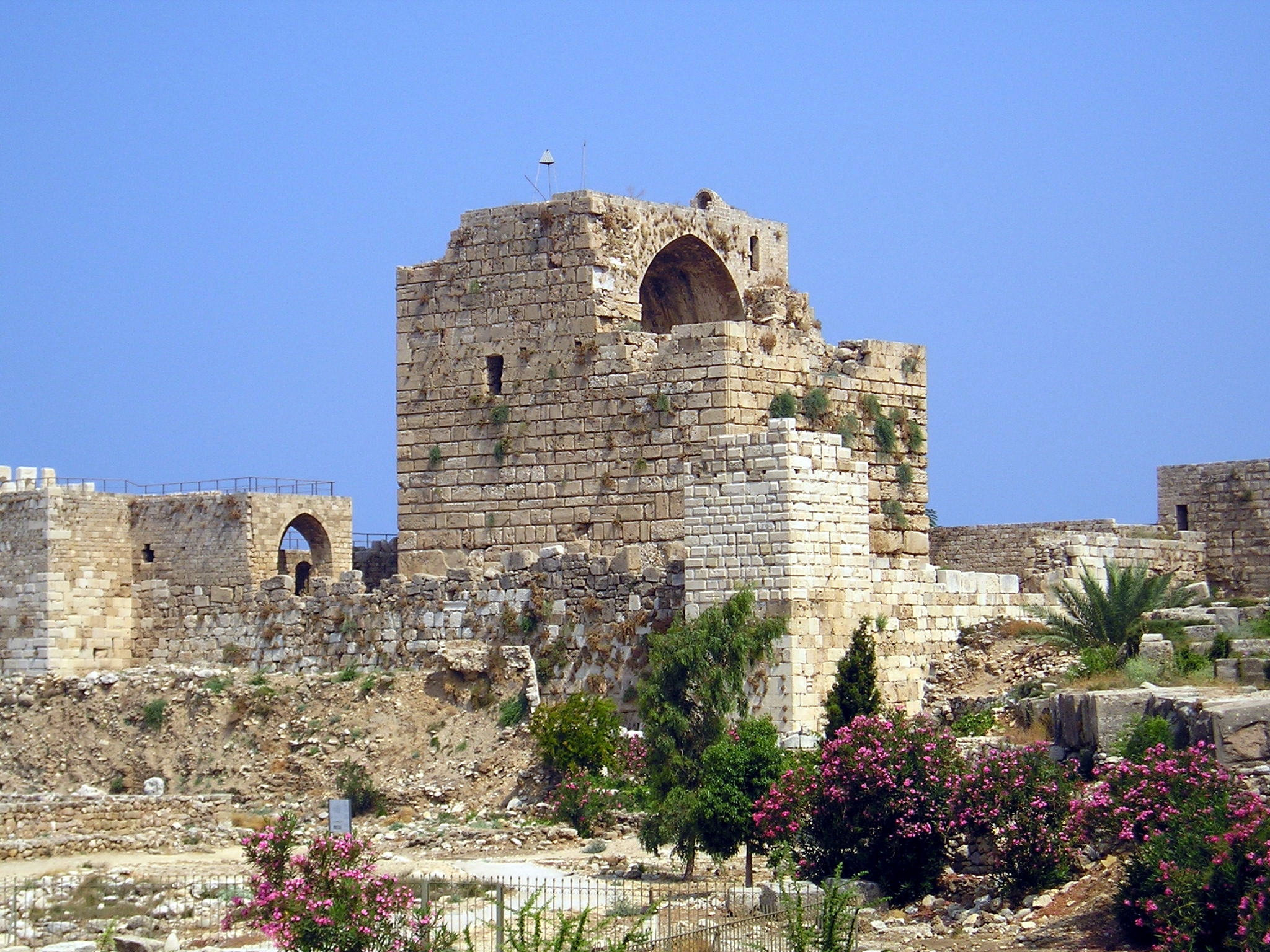
In the area of Tripoli, only the fief of Gibelet (modern Byblos) remained free from Mamluk conquest, for about 10 more years.

Tripoli was razed to the ground, and Qalawun ordered a new Tripoli to be built on another spot, a few miles inland at the foot of Mount Pilgrim. Soon other nearby cities were also captured, such as Nephin (modern Enfeh) and Le Boutron (modern Batroun). Peter of Gibelet kept his lands around Gibelet (modern Byblos) for about 10 more years, in exchange for the payment of a tribute to the Sultan.

== Aftermath ==
Two years later Acre, the last major Crusader outpost in the Holy Land was also captured in the Siege of Acre in 1291. It was considered by many historians to mark the end of the Crusades, though there were still a few other territories being held to the north, in Tortosa and Atlit. However the last of those, the small Templar garrison on the island of Ruad was captured in 1302 in a siege. With the Fall of Ruad, the last bit of Crusader-held land in the Levant was lost.
