= Paul of Segni =

Paul of Segni was an Italian nobleman and Franciscan friar who served as the bishop of Tripoli in the Levant from 1261 until 1285 and as a papal legate to the kingdoms of Germany and Sicily in 1279–1280. He was the most prominent churchman from the east at the Second Council of Lyon in 1274. After 1275, he was involved in a dispute with the bishop of Tortosa that took him to Rome. He spent his last five years in Italy.

== Family ==
Paul was born into the Roman noble family of the counts of Segni and owned land in the Papal State. He was a friar of the Franciscan Order and an associate (confrater) of the Order of the Temple. His sister, Lucia, was the wife of Prince Bohemond V of Antioch and mother of Bohemond VI.

== Tripoli ==
It was through the influence of his sister and nephew that Paul was appointed bishop sometime before October 1261. He succeeded Opizo, who is last mentioned in July 1259 and probably died around the time of the Mongol invasion of 1260. Opizo had excommunicated Bohemond VI, but Pope Urban IV granted Paul wide latitude in dealing with his nephew while the case was sub judice. Paul's influence brought many Roman knights into Bohemond's service.

In 1274, Paul led a delegation from the East to attend the Second Council of Lyon. Guillaume de Beaujeu, the Grand Master of the Temple, was part of the delegation. He shared the presidency of the council with two other Franciscans: Bonaventure and Eudes Rigaud.

After the death of Bohemond VI in 1275, his widow, Sibyl, invited Bishop Bartholomew of Tortosa to act as regent for her young son, Bohemond VII. Since Bartholomew was also the vicar of the absentee patriarch of Antioch, Opizo dei Fieschi, this brought him into conflict with Paul. Since the fall of Antioch in 1268, Tripoli was the seat of the princely government. After he took up residence in Tripoli, Bartholomew, who outranked Paul both spiritually and secularly, sided with Paul's detractors among the native baronage. The result was riots in which several Roman knights were killed. Paul was forced to place himself and his possessions under the protection of the Templars. He had the full support of Guillaume de Beaujeu.

The dispute between Paul and Bartholomew was complicated by a dispute between Bartholomew and the Lord Guy II of Gibelet. Guy had arranged the marriage of his son to a wealthy heiress, preempting Bartholomew's plans for his nephew's marriage. By 1277, this had led to open warfare between the lord of Gibelet and the Templars on one side and Bohemond's government under Bartholomew and Sibyl on the other. In a letter to Pope Nicholas III, Paul accused Bohemond of seizing his goods, imprisoning his servants and attacking his safehouse. Although he excommunicated the prince and placed the city under interdict, clergy who obeyed him were punished by Bohemond. Bartholomew, acting as patriarchal vicar, absolved Bohemond of the ban. The prince eventually forced Paul to leave the city.

== Italy and Germany ==
In the fall of 1278, Roger of San Severino and Nicolas Lorgne arrived in Tripoli to mediate between the prince and the bishop. On 18 September, an agreement between Paul and Bohemond was signed. The pope summoned Bartholomew to Rome to answer the charges brought by Paul against him. Paul himself travelled to Rome to argue his case in 1279 and never returned to Tripoli. In his absence, he deputized the canon Peter Orlando of Valmoton to act as his vicar. Both Paul and Pope Nicholas had died by the time Bartholomew, belatedly obeying the summons, arrived in Rome in 1285. Pope Martin IV ordered the case dropped.

Paul passed the last five years of his life mostly in Italy. He occasionally acted as a papal legate, most importantly in the negotiations between King Rudolf I of Germany and King Charles I of Sicily. He was dispatched to the court of Rudolf in June 1279 with the goal of obtaining Rudolf's recognition for Charles's succession to the County of Provence and an alliance between the two sealed by the marriage of Charles's grandson, Charles Martel, to Rudolf's daughter, Clemence. He received further instructions from Pope Nicholas in a letter dated 23 January 1280.

Paul died in 1285. He was the last resident Catholic bishop of Tripoli.

== Bibliography ==
- Burgtorf, Jochen (2008). The Central Convent of Hospitallers and Templars: History, Organization, and Personnel (1099/1120–1310). Leiden: Brill.
- Fournier, Paul (1891). Le royaume d'Arles et de Vienne (1138–1378): Étude sur la formation territoriale de la France dans l'Ést et le Sudest. Paris: Alphonse Picard.
- Hamilton, Bernard (1980). The Latin Church in the Crusader States: The Secular Church. Ashgate.
- Runciman, Steven (1954). A History of the Crusades, Volume III: The Kingdom of Acre and the Later Crusades. Cambridge: Cambridge University Press.
- Thomson, Williel R. (1975). Friars in the Cathedral: The First Franciscan Bishops, 1226–1261. Toronto: Pontifical Institute of Mediaeval Studies.
