= Counting house =

Office where the financial books of a business were kept

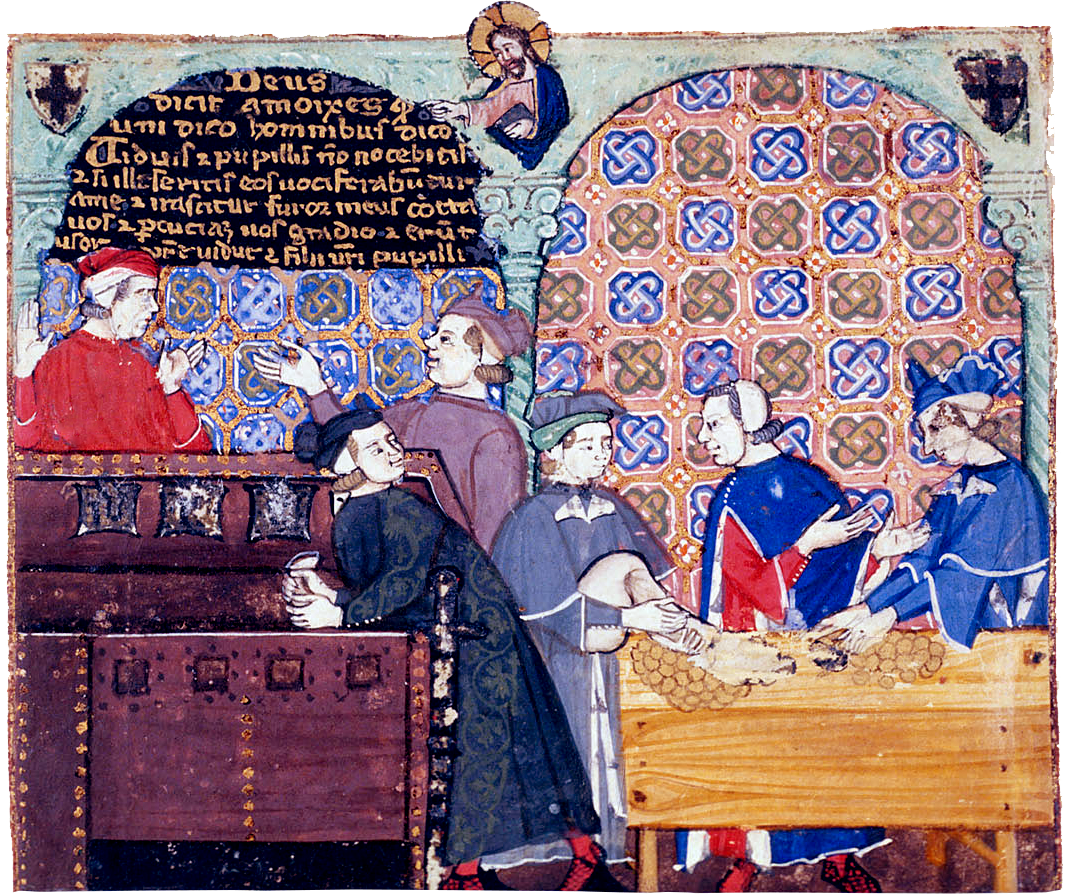
Painting depicting bankers in an Italian counting house in the 14th century, from the Cocharelli Codex

A counting house, or counting room, was traditionally an office where the financial books of a business were kept. It was also the place that the business received appointments and correspondence relating to demands for payment.

Originating in Italy, the counting house was a central feature of commerce in the high Middle Ages and afterward. Calculations were typically done openly on a counting board so that interested people could observe them. As technology developed and new practices emerged, particularly the adoption of Arabic numerals in financial record-keeping, use of the counting board became obsolete.

As the use of counting houses spread in the 19th century, so did their reputation as being often uncomfortable and dreary places to work. This was most famously exemplified in Charles Dickens' A Christmas Carol, where the clerk Bob Cratchit spends his days toiling in the employ of Ebenezer Scrooge.

== See also ==
- Accounts payable
- Count room, a secure room for counting cash
- Exchequer
- Factory (trading post), a fortified settlement for the counting houses of overseas merchants
