= Lucia of Segni =

Lucia of Segni, also called Lucienne (died 1258), was a princess and countess, and later regent, of the Principality of Antioch and County of Tripoli.

Lucia was born into the family of the counts of Segni. She was the grandniece of Pope Innocent III and cousin of Pope Gregory IX, who arranged for her to become the second wife of Bohemond V, the prince of Antioch and count of Tripoli. The marriage took place in 1238. Lucia was responsible for Bohemond's close relations with the Holy See, but his barons resented the number of Roman relatives and friends she invited to the Latin East. For this reason Bohemond was not popular with the Greek-dominated Commune of Antioch and resided instead in Tripoli. Lucia may have influenced the appointment of the new Greek Orthodox patriarch of Antioch, David, in c. 1240, and she had her brother Paul installed as the bishop of Tripoli.

Lucia and Bohemond V had two children, Plaisance and Bohemond VI. Bohemond V died in January 1252 when Bohemond VI, his successor, was aged 15 and thus still a minor. Lucia assumed regency for her son, but was an irresponsible administrator. She stayed in Tripoli, leaving Antioch to be governed by her Roman relatives. Such was her unpopularity that the young Bohemond asked Pope Innocent IV to be declared of age a few months early. Innocent agreed. King Louis IX of France, who was in the Latin East on the Seventh Crusade and encamped in Jaffa, mediated in the dispute between mother and son. The dowager princess, thus deprived of power (1254), was compensated with a substantial income. She nevertheless succeeded in keeping Romans in important posts after her regency, leading to an unsuccessful baronial rebellion against her son.

== Sources ==
- Mayer, Hans Eberhard (1978). "Ibelin versus Ibelin: the struggle for the regency of Jerusalem, 1253–1258". Proceedings of the American Philosophical Society. CXII: 25–57.
- Runciman, Steven (1989). A History of the Crusades, Volume III: The Kingdom of Acre and the Later Crusades. Cambridge University Press. ISBN 0-521-06163-6.
- Kostick, Conor (2010). The Crusades and the Near East: Cultural Histories. Routledge. ISBN 978-1136902482.
