= Truce of Tripoli (1271) =

The Truce of Tripoli was an agreement signed in late May 1271 between the Mamluk Sultan Baybars and the Count of Tripoli Bohemond VI of Antioch. Baybars initially wanted to attack the County of Tripoli, but after the arrival of a new Ninth Crusade, he made a truce that lasted ten years with terms to allow Baybars to retain his conquests.

== Background ==
After learning of Louis IX's death during the previous crusade in Tunis, the Mamluk Sultan Baybars concluded that the immediate danger of another major crusade had passed, allowing him to turn his full attention toward the remaining Crusader strongholds, particularly Acre. In February 1271, he first attacked the Templars' Chastel Blanc. The fortress controlled important routes connecting Tripoli and Acre, and from its position Baybars could observe the formidable Krak des Chevaliers, his next objective, which was held by roughly 300 Hospitaller knights.

Krak occupied a strategically vital valley linking the Mediterranean coast with the Syrian interior and served as one of the principal defenses of the County of Tripoli. Its importance was such that Muslim observers reportedly described it as a "bone in the throat." Baybars reached the fortress on 3 March, although heavy rainfall delayed the main assault until 15 March. Despite its formidable defenses and reputation for having resisted even Saladin, the castle eventually capitulated to Baybars on 8 April 1271.

Baybars sought to secure the fortress while limiting unnecessary destruction and encouraged its defenders to surrender rather than subjecting the castle to prolonged bombardment by his powerful siege engines. He had already breached its outer defenses in late March after his troops spent weeks tunnelling through the underlying rock and undermining the walls, causing part of the fortifications to collapse dramatically. In contrast to some of his earlier conquests, Baibars permitted the surrendering Hospitallers to withdraw safely toward Tripoli. By capturing Krak de Chevaliers, the sultan sought not merely to eliminate a major obstacle to Mamluk expansion but to turn the fortress into a strategic base from which the Crusader states—above all the County of Tripoli—could themselves be threatened.

== Truce ==
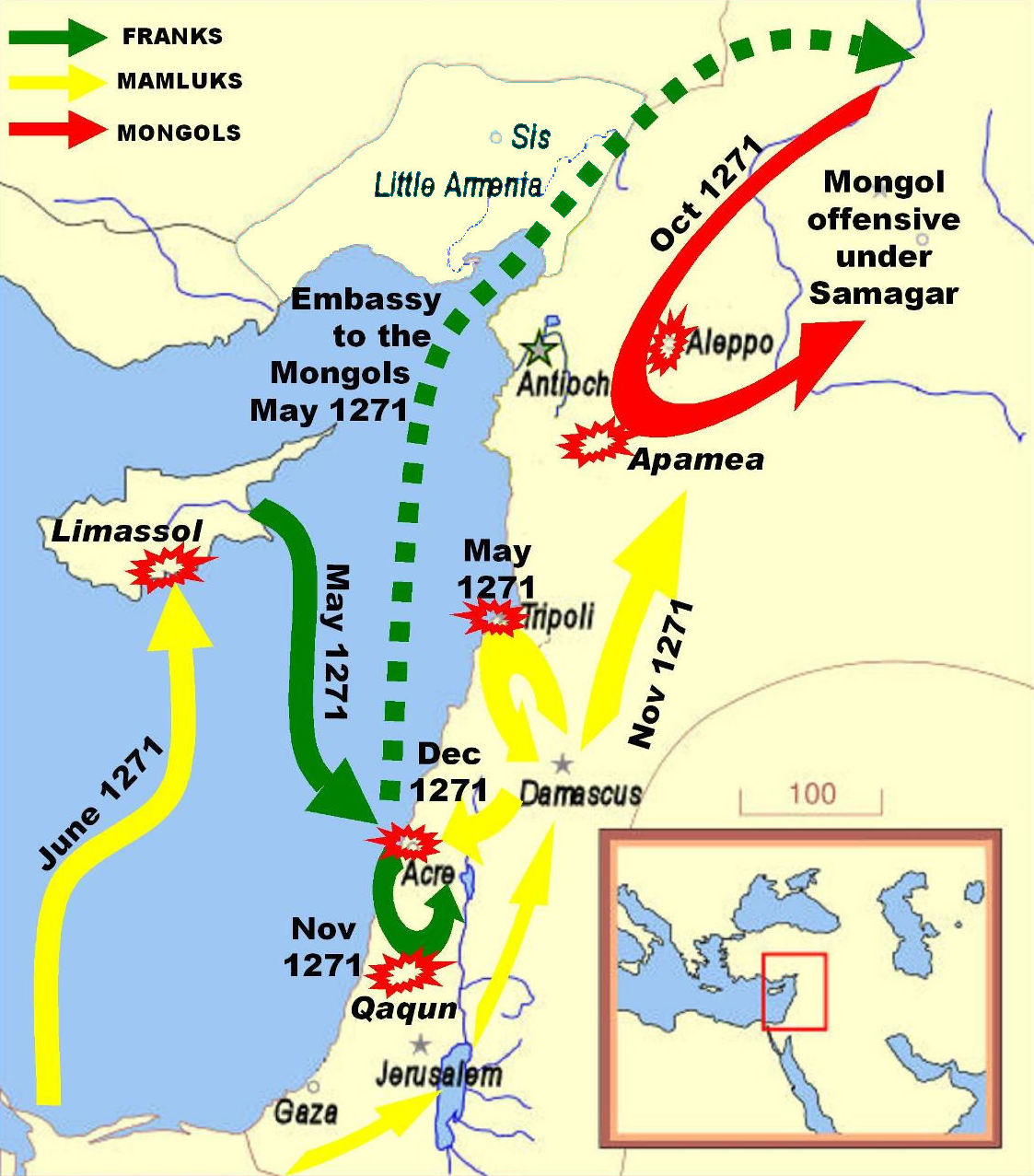
Baibars's planned campaign in Tripoli came to a halt in May 1271 when Edward I arrived in the Levant, starting the Ninth Crusade.

Baybars next turned his sights on Tripoli and sent a letter to Bohemond threatening him with total annihilation and taunting him for his alliance with the Mongol ruler Abaqa:

Our yellow flags have repelled your red flags, and the sound of the bells has been replaced by the call: "Allâh Akbar!" (...) Warn your walls and your churches that soon our siege machinery will deal with them, your knights that soon our swords will invite themselves in their homes (...) We will see then what use will be your alliance with Abagha"

— Letter from Baibars to Bohemond VI, 1271

Bohemond begged for a truce so as not to lose Tripoli as well. Baybars mocked him for his lack of courage and asked him to pay all the expenses of the Mamluk campaign. Bohemond had enough pride left to refuse the offer. According to the chronicle of Abbot Menko of Bloemhof, Bohemond threatened to fight to the death if Baybars refused to agree to a truce.

By this time, the Mamluks had captured every inland castle of the Franks, but the Mamluks had heard reports about the arrival of the Ninth Crusade, led by the prince who would later be Edward I of England. Edward had landed in Acre on May 9, 1271, where he was soon joined by his cousin King Hugh of Cyprus and Jerusalem. According to Ibn al-Furat, Baybars stopped with a light force in front of Tripoli sometime after 16 May. Negotiations were conducted by the dawadar Sayf al-Din. At the end of the month, they had agreed to a truce for ten years, with no other terms than the retention of his recent conquests.

== Aftermath ==
Although the truce ended Baybars immediate campaign against Tripoli, it did not end his military operations against the Franks elsewhere. Baybars subsequently moved south and besieged Montfort Castle, a major stronghold of the Teutonic Order. The castle surrendered to the Mamluks in June 1271 and its fortifications were subsequently destroyed.

The arrival of Edward and the truce saved Tripoli for another 18 years. The truce had run its course. In 1281, the Mamluk Sultan Qalawun and Bohemond VII of Antioch renewed the truce after a settlement dispute was solved favorably to the Sultan. The next major offensive against Tripoli was in 1289 by the Mamluk Sultan Qalawun, who successfully orchestrated the fall of Tripoli and destruction of the Crusader State. He then made plans to capture the last major Crusader stronghold, Saint-Jean d'Acre, but died in 1290. The fall of Acre was achieved in 1291 by Qalawun's son, Al-Ashraf Khalil.

== Sources ==
- René Grousset (1936), Histoire des croisades et du royaume franc de Jérusalem, III: L'anarchie franque, 1188–1291.
- P. M. Holt (2021), Early Mamluk Diplomacy (1260-1290): Treaties of Baybars and Qalāwūn with Christian Rulers.
- Rabei G. Khamisy (2018), Baybars' strategy of war against the Franks in Journal of Medieval Military History Volume XVI.
- John Marshall (2025), Othon de Grandson. Edward I’s Loyal Knight of Renown.
- Ursula and Malcolm Lyons with Jonathan Riley-Smith (1971), Ayyubids, Mamlukes and Crusaders Vol. 2.
- Steven Runciman (1954), A History of the Crusades Vol. III.
