= Opizzo Fieschi =

Opizzo Fieschi (d. c. 1291), also known as Opizo or Opiso dei' Fieschi, was a 13th-century Italian cleric from the powerful Genovese Fieschi family. Following his uncle Sinibaldo's election as Pope Innocent IV, Opizzo was appointed the Catholic Church's patriarch of Antioch (probably in 1247 and possibly serving as long as the fall of Antioch in 1268). (Note: Hamilton, cited in Jackson.)

== Life ==
Opizzo was born to the Fieschi, the Genovese dynasty of the counts of Lavagna, sometime in the first part of the 13th century. His parentage is uncertain, although certain church records suggest his father was Tedisio Fieschi.

His paternal uncle Sinibaldo was elected Pope Innocent IV in 1243. In October 1245, Opizzo was dispatched to end the conflict between Eastern Pomerania and the Teutonic Order.

The Latin patriarch of Antioch, Albert of Rezzato, died during the Council of Lyon and sometime before 22 July 1246 Pope Innocent named his nephew to succeed him. In October 1247, Opizzo was named apostolic delegate to the Seventh Crusade but he did not leave Genoa for the east until mid-1248. By then, he had secured papal approval of his authority over all bishops suffragan to the Greek patriarch of his city; upon arriving in Antioch, he excommunicated Euthymius, who was forced to flee. In late 1248, amid the Seventh Crusade, Opizzo requested help from the French king Louis IX, following raids by the Turcomans; Louis granted the bishop and his lord Bohemond 600 crossbowmen but no knights, out of "fear that the army might break up and that it would prove impossible to reassemble it at the scheduled time." (Note: A letter by the cardinal and legate Odo of Châteauroux, published in Achéry and published in translation in Jackson.) A papal letter dated 7 November 1252 directed him to recognize that Prince Bohemond had reached the age of majority and no longer required the regency of his mother, Luciana Segni. Letters dated 30 March 1254 granted him the church of Nicosia and—on account of the expenses occasioned by his visits to the Roman Curia where he was a professor of law—a portion of the income of the late bishop of Norwich and half the subsidies being directed to the aid of Antioch. He was at Acre in October 1254.

Innocent IV's successor Pope Alexander IV recognized Opizzo's continued service as papal legate in the region on 23 March 1255. When he was elected as patriarch of Jerusalem by its three canons, however, Alexander saw fit to quash the result, instead appointing the bishop of Verdun on 9 April. By 17 December, owing to the continued destruction within his territory, Opizzo received a promise to receive the first vacant position within the principalities of Antioch or Cyprus: this was made good by his receipt of the church of Limassol on Cyprus on 21 February of the next year. On 28 January 1256, the bishops of Tortosa and Tripoli were ordered to provide Opizzo with the funds previously deposited with the Templars and Hospitallers by Innocent IV. On 6 September, however, he was stripped of his jurisdiction over Nicosia.

Under Alexander IV's successor Urban IV, Opizzo received the income of the priory of St Lazarus of Tripoli on 13 January 1262. By 1264, Opizzo was being represented in Antioch by a vicar and he was apparently not present in the city when it fell with great bloodshed to Baibars, the sultan of Egypt, on 15 April 1268.

Pope Nicholas III named him director of the church of Trani on 1 April 1288.

Pope Nicholas IV named him administrator of the diocese of Genoa on 4 June 1288, causing him to surrender Trani by 5 November. Supposedly, he supported the failed uprising on 1 January 1289; afterwards, he remained in his office but fled the city, daily administration being left to his vicar Bartolomeo da Reggio. He died in or shortly after 1291.

== See also ==
- Principality of Antioch
- Princes Bohemond V (1233–1252) and VI (1252–1268)
- Dorotheus (1219–1245) and Simeon II (1245–1268), Orthodox patriarchs of Antioch
- Ignatius III David (1222–1252) and John XII bar Maʿdani (1252–1263), Syriac patriarchs of Antioch
