= Simon Mansel =

Constable of Antioch (13th century)

Simon Mansel (between 1205 and 1220 – after 1268) was a Constable of Antioch.

He belonged to the important Frankish Mansel family from Antioch. He was believed to be a son of Robert Mansel, who became constable to Antioch in 1207. Bartholomew Mansel, Bishop of Tartus, was probably his brother. Through his Armenian mother, he was related to King Hethum I, King of Armenia. He married a descendant of Simon de Bouillon, chamberlain of Antioch, then a daughter of Constantine of Baberon, Lord of Barbaron and Partzapert.

He was constable of Antioch when the city fortress was attacked and besieged by the Mamluks under Sultan Baibars on May 14, 1268 . Since Prince Bohemond VI was in Tripoli, Simon commanded the defence. On the first day of the siege, he led a sortie against the attackers, but was taken prisoner by the Mamluks. From captivity he tried to negotiate a capitulation of the city, but the remaining defenders rejected this and offered the attackers fierce resistance despite their great numerical inferiority. Finally, on May 18, the city was stormed and sacked by the Mamluks, and the remaining population was massacred or enslaved. Simon was among the few who were released and went into exile with relatives in Lesser Armenia.

== Sources ==
- Setton, Kenneth M.; Wolff, Robert Lee; Hazard, Harry W. (2006). A History of the Crusades. Volume II: The Later Crusades, 1189-1311. Madison: University of Wisconsin Press. ISBN 0299048446.
- Rudt de Collenberg, W. H. (1983). A Fragmentary Copy of an Unknown Recension of the 'Lignages d'Outre-Mer' in the Vatican Library. Vol. 98. Oxford University Press.
- Runciman, Steven (1995). History of the Crusades (in German). Munich: CH Beck. ISBN 3406399606.
