= Officers of the County of Tripoli =

As in the Kingdom of Jerusalem, the County of Tripoli had a smattering of offices: seneschal, constable, marshal, chamberlain, and chancellor.

The Great Officers of the County of Tripoli were:

== Seneschal ==
- Raymond (1117)
- Brunel (1139–1143)

== Constable ==
- William Peter (1106), perhaps just Marshal of the Camp
- William Raymond (1106), perhaps just Marshal of the Camp
- Roger (1110–1117)
- Silvius (1139)
- Rainier (1140–1143)
- Arnald de Crest (1151–1155)
- Hugh Sine Censu (1161–1164)
- Raymond de Gibelet (1181–1183)
- Odo of Saint-Omer (1194)
- Gerard of Ham (1198–1217)
- John (1217), also marshal (see below)
- Thomas of Ham (1227–1255)
- William Farabel (1277–1282)

== Marshal ==
- Falcrand (1142–1145)
- William de Lulen (1151)
- N. de Monteprasto (1163)
- Raymond (1177–1179)
- John (1187–1217), also constable (see above)
- John (1241–1278)

== Chamberlain ==
- Walter de Margat (1137)
- Rainald (1139)
- Albert (1143)

== Chancellor ==
- Pons (1126), also archdeacon of Saint Paul
- Jotron (1139–1143)
- Peter (1142–1143)
- Alberic (1163)
- Matthew (1174–1187)
- John (1202), perhaps John of Corbonio, who was chancellor of Antioch under Bohemond IV

== See also ==
- Officers of the Kingdom of Jerusalem
- Officers of the Kingdom of Cyprus
- Officers of the Principality of Antioch
- Officers of the County of Edessa
