= Officers of the County of Edessa =

The officers (or great officers) of the County of Edessa were the appointed officials in charge of various aspects of the government of the county. The offices they held pertained to the management of the count's household and the military defence of the county. The same offices existed in the other Crusader states, but given the early collapse of Edessa (1144) they are poorly attested there.

Among the offices recorded at Edessa are those of castellan, chancellor, constable and marshal. Two constables are known: Hervé from 1134 and Roger from 1141. Also known from 1141 are the marshal Hubert, the chancellor Raoul and the castellan Isembard. A charter of the lordship of Marash from the 1140s names a certain Guiscard as "dapifer of the count", which would seem to indicate the steward of the count of Edessa. The offices of bailiff, butler, chamberlain and seneschal, found in the other Crusader states, are not mentioned at Edessa in any surviving source. This does not mean that they did not exist.

In Edessa, the treasury was known as either the secretarium (after Byzantine usage) or the divan (after Arabic usage). In 1099, Count Baldwin I was accompanied by a "secretary" (secretarius) named Gerard, perhaps the master of the secretarium and hence treasurer. Likewise, when he acquired Edessa in 1098 Baldwin was accompanied by a chaplain, Fulcher of Chartres, who most likely supervised his chancery and acted as de facto chancellor.

== See also ==
- Officers of the Kingdom of Jerusalem
- Officers of the Kingdom of Cyprus
- Officers of the Principality of Antioch
- Officers of the County of Tripoli
