= Robert Mansel (constable) =

Constable of Antioch (13th century)

Robert Mansel (c. 1175 – after March 1219) was Constable of Antioch (1207–1219).

== Life ==
Robert Mansel belonged to the important Frankish Mansel family from Antioch. He was a son of Sibylla from her first marriage, who later married Prince Bohemond III of Antioch in her third marriage. On May 22, 1207, he was first documented as a constable of Antioch.

=== Marriage and issue ===
He married a sister of Constantine of Baberon, with whom he had two sons:

- Simon Mansel, Constable of Antioch
- Bartholomew Mansel, Bishop of Tartus

He was last documented in March 1219.

== Sources ==
- Röhricht, Reinhold (1893). Regesta Regni Hierosolymitani (in Latin). Innsbruck: Oeniponti.
- Rudt de Collenberg, W. H. (1983). A Fragmentary Copy of an Unknown Recension of the 'Lignages d'Outre-Mer' in the Vatican Library. Vol. 98. Oxford University Press.
