= John (bishop of Tripoli) =

John (died 1184×1186) was the chancellor of the Principality of Antioch from 1177 until 1183 and the bishop of Tripoli from 1183 until 1184. Prior to becoming the bishop, he also held the position of archdeacon of the Patriarchate of Antioch during his time as chancellor. His appointment to the bishopric may have been intended as a reward for his years of service, though it may also indicate his reluctance to serve Prince Bohemond III after the latter's conflict with Patriarch Aimery of Limoges. John briefly held the chancellorship and bishopric simultaneously—signing a charter of Bohemond III in May 1183—but soon relinquished it. He was succeeded as chancellor by Archbishop Albert of Tarsus, who was in office by 1184, and as bishop by Aimery no later than 1186.
