= Galeran of Ivry =

Galeran of Ivry was an official of Charles I of Sicily.

Galeran was appointed seneschal of the kingdom of Sicily in 1272, where he was unpopular due to his arrogance and partiality.

After the death of William II Villehardouin in 1278, the principality of Achaea fell, by the operation of the Treaty of Viterbo, to Charles. Galeran was sent to Achaea as Charles' first bailli and vicar-general in that province.

His tenure was not a success. Accustomed to the centralized administration of the kingdom of Sicily, he aroused many complaints from nobles whose feudal rights he traduced, and had difficulty in properly maintaining the troops and equipping the fortresses in Achaea. His one attempt at a military campaign against the Byzantines was defeated in the mountains of Skorta. A deputation of the Achaean barons, sent to Naples in 1280, obtained his recall and replacement by Philip of Lagonesse.

New title	Angevin bailli in the Principality of Achaea; 1278–1280	Succeeded by Philip of Lagonesse
