= Philip of Lagonesse =

Philip of Lagonesse was an official of Charles I of Sicily.

== Early life ==
He was a Frenchman, from Gonesse or La Gonesse, a village near Paris. His father, Guillaume of Lagonesse, had accompanied Charles on his conquest of the Kingdom of Sicily, and died in 1269. Philip was invested by Charles with the fief of Roccaguglielma in 1272.

== Career ==
While serving as seneschal of Piedmont, he was sharply defeated in autumn of 1275 and was forced to retreat into Provence, abandoning most of the province. However, before 1278, he had been granted the additional fief of San Nicandro.

Made marshal of the Kingdom of Sicily some time after Charles' conquest of that kingdom, he was appointed bailli and vicar-general of Achaea in 1280. His predecessor, Galeran of Ivry, had left the affairs of the principality in disarray, and Philip strove to pay off the troops stationed there and improve the fortresses with funds from the reorganized mint at Glarentza.

After the Sicilian Vespers and the revolt of the island of Sicily, he was recalled from Achaea for the ensuing war. He was invested with Giffoni and Vairano in 1284; he was, in addition, Lord of Airola.

== Personal life ==
He married the widowed Altruda de Apolita and had four children:

- Guglielmo (d. v.p.)
- Giovanni (Gianotto), Lord of Airola until 1296, when he lost it to his cousin Carlo
- Guglielma (d. aft. 1294), married Sergio Siginolfo, Lord of Mondragone
- Mileta, married Gualtieri Caracciolo Pisquizi, Lord of Arnesano

Government offices
Preceded by Galeran of Ivry	Angevin bailli in the Principality of Achaea; 1280–1282	Succeeded by Narjot de Toucy
