= Officers of the Principality of Antioch =

The Principality of Antioch mirrored the Latin Kingdom of Jerusalem in its selection of great offices: constable, marshal, seneschal, chamberlain, butler, chancellor and at certain times also bailiff.

The officers of the Principality of Antioch are listed below. Dates are dates of attestation, not necessarily beginning and end dates of tenure.

== Constable ==
- Robert FitzGerard (1098)
- Richard (1101), perhaps Richard of the Principate and perhaps only a titular constable
- Adam (1113)
- Rainald I Masoir (1127–1134)
- Walter de Sourdeval (1134–1135)
- Roger des Monts (1140–1149)
- Archembaud (1153)
- Geoffrey Jordan (1154)
- Guiscard de l'Île (1170–1172), initially as vice-constable (1170) and then constable (1172)
- Baldwin (1175–1180)
- Rainald II Masoir (1179)
- Baldwin (1180)
- Ralph des Monts (1186–1194)
- Roger des Monts (1194–1216)
- Robert Mansel (1207–1219), also mayor in 1219
- Simon Mansel (1262)

== Marshal ==
According to Claude Cahen, there were usually two marshals serving concurrently. Andrew Buck's listing implies otherwise.

- Raymond (1140)
- William Tirel (1149–1169)
- Bartholomew Tirel (1181–1193, 1183–1193 or 1186–1191)
- Thomas Tirel (1201–1231)
- Bartholomew Tirel (1262)
- Garin Malmut (1140–1160)
- William de Cavea (1175–1186)
- Hugh Flauncurt (1193–1194)
- Basil (1210), either honorarily or as marshal of Armenia

== Seneschal ==
- Alberic (1119), vice-seneschal
- Eschivard of Sarmenia (1149–1169)
- Gervais of Sarmenia (1175–1195, 1180–1194 or 1181–1199)
- Acharie of Sarmenia (1216–1251), also mayor in 1216
- Peter de Hazart (1262)

== Butler ==
- Martin of Margat (1140–1144)
- Peter Salvarici (1149)
- William de Monci (1169)
- Paganus (1210)
- Julien le Jaune (1216)

== Chamberlain ==
- Trigaud (1138)
- Basil (1140)
- Peter (1153–1172)
- William (1163)
- Raymond de Gibelet (1174)
- Oliver (1179–1190)
- Simon Burgevin (1195–1216)

== Chancellor ==
- Walter (1114–1122)
- Ralph (1127), may have been the chancellor of the patriarch
- Franco (1133–1135)
- Eudes (1140)
- John (1149)
- Walter (1154)
- Geoffrey (1154)
- Burchard (1155)
- Bernard (1163–1170)
- William (1172)

vacancy (1175)

- John (1177–1183), absent for a time in 1178, became bishop of Tripoli
- Albert (1186–1191), archbishop of Tarsus, away from Antioch on an embassy in 1187
- Alexander (1193–1200)
- John of Corbonio (1203–1205)
- Jordan (1215–1216 or 1216–1219)
- John (before 1225), probably John of Corbonio again
- Geoffrey (1241), elected bishop of Tiberias
- William (1262)

== Bailiff ==
- Fulk (1133/4–1136), king of Jerusalem, acting as regent for Constance of Antioch

== Viscount ==
- Thorold, first attested Viscount of Antioch. Toroldus vicecomes subscribed a charter dated 1101 under which Tancredus princeps granted property to consulibus Januensium.

== See also ==
- Officers of the Kingdom of Jerusalem
- Officers of the Kingdom of Cyprus
- Officers of the County of Tripoli
- Officers of the County of Edessa

== Bibliography ==
- Buck, Andrew D. (2017). The Principality of Antioch and Its Frontiers in the Twelfth Century. The Boydell Press.
- Cahen, Claude (1940). La Syrie du nord a l'époque des Croisades et la principauté d'Antioche. Geuthner.
- La Monte, John L. (1932). Feudal Monarchy in the Latin Kingdom of Jerusalem 1100 to 1291. Medieval Academy of America.
