= Narjot de Toucy (died 1293) =

Narjot (or Narjod) de Toucy (died 1293) was the son of Philip of Toucy and of Portia de Roye. Narjot was therefore the grandson of his namesake who died in 1241.

Narjot de Toucy was Lord of Laterza, Captain-General of the Kingdom of Albania, Admiral of the Angevin Kingdom of Sicily in 1277, and bailli of the Principality of Achaea in 1282. On 23 June 1287 he helped command an Angevin galley fleet which was defeated by a fleet commanded by Roger of Lauria in the Battle of the Counts.

In c. 1275 or 1278 he married Lucia I, titular princess of Antioch, who was to become Countess of Tripoli in 1288, later titular. They had one son, Philippe II de Toucy, who inherited the lordship of Laterza on Narjot's death in 1293 and the claim to Antioch on Lucia's death.

Government offices
Preceded by Philip of Lagonesse	Angevin bailli in the Principality of Achaea; 1282	Succeeded by Guy of Dramelay
