= Cocharelli Codex =

Latin manuscript

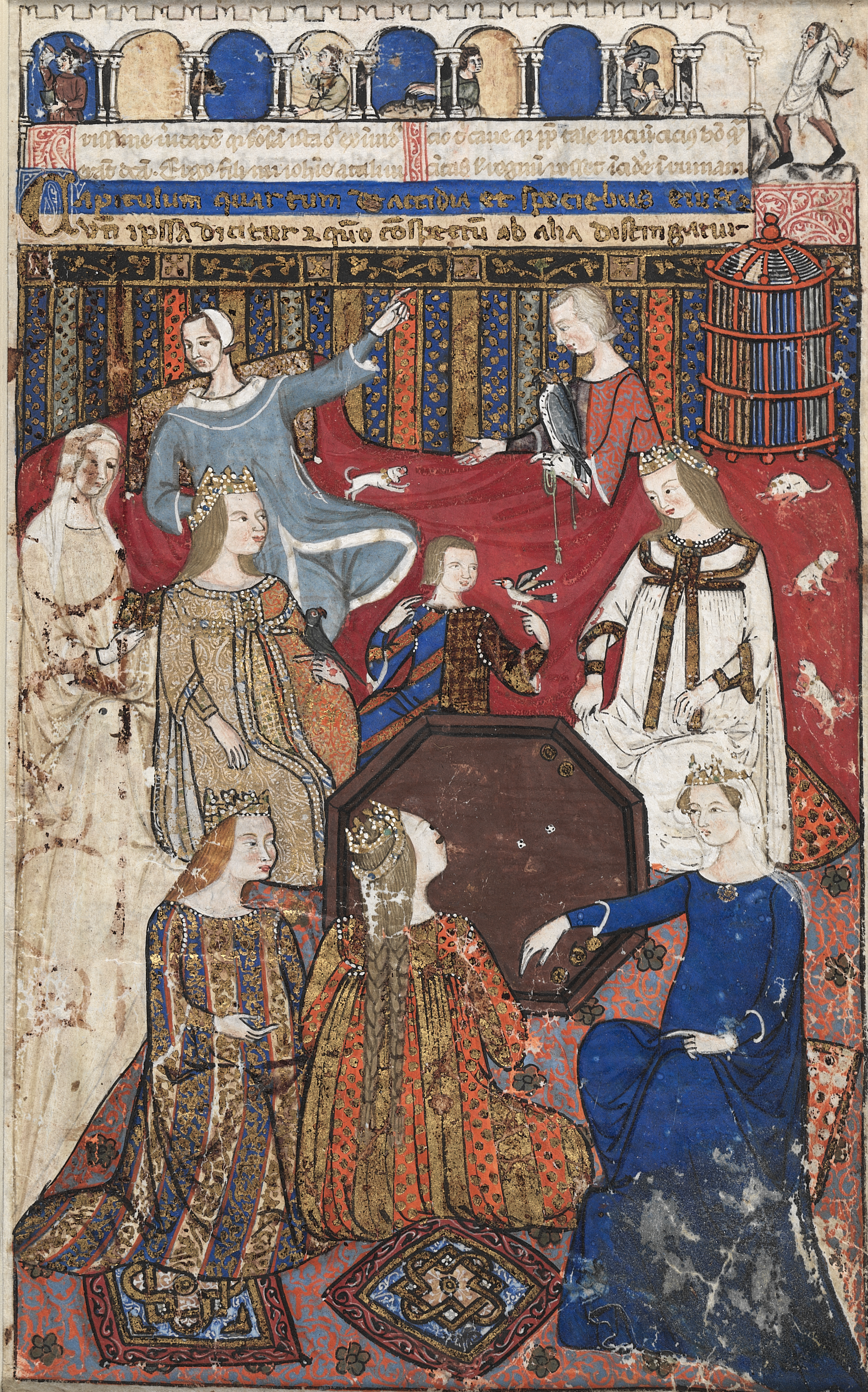
Acedia and her Court

The Cocharelli Codex is a fragmentary illustrated manuscript written in Latin, thought to have been created in Genoa in the first quarter of the fourteenth century for the Cocharelli family, migrants to Genoa, originating from the County of Provençe. The text consists of a tract on the vices and virtues as well as a versified history interspersed with a miscellany of biblical proverbs and moral dictates. It is the rich program of illustration appearing on every page that has attracted attention and garnered high praise. The Codex is generally regarded one of the most astonishing products of medieval Italian illumination art.

The manuscript is incomplete and dismembered: 27 leaves and cuttings are preserved in three institutions: London, The British Library; The Cleveland Museum of Art, and Florence, Museo Nazionale del Bargello. The fragments are disarranged, and no account of the losses has been taken in the present numbering of the leaves and cuttings, which presents a significant challenge to anyone wishing to read it. The surviving fragments, however, have been digitally reassembled.

The author-compiler of the manuscript is not named, but in the Preface communicates the name of his grandfather "auo meo domino Pelegrino Cocharello condam [= quondam]", translated as "my grandfather, the late Lord Pellegrino Cocharello". A second piece of personal information revealed by the author-compiler in the Preface is that the Codex is addressed to his son ‘Iohannes’. Surviving archival records indicate that Pellegrino and his family traveled from the County of Provençe to Acre in the second half of the thirteenth century, where he established himself as a prominent financier, sat as a jurist in the Cour des Bourgeois between 1269 and 1274, and joined the Hospital of St John taking on the role of servicing the Order's loans. Political instability in the Latin East, and the expansionist ambitions of the Bahri Mamluks saw Pellegrino move his family to the Kingdom of Cyprus, then moved to the north Italian port city Genoa around 1300. The family prospered in Genoa and came to attain a high social standing, listed in genealogical tables composed in the seventeenth century as one of the 865 legally designated Genoese noble families.

At an unknown date, the Codex left the ownership of the Cocharelli and was dismembered and pillaged. Three fragments re-surfaced in the nineteenth century: fifteen cropped leaves and cuttings (Additional 27695 ff. 1–15v) were discovered interleaved through a Missal dated 1467; seven leaves (Additional 28841 ff. 1–7v) were listed for sale at auction in London in 1871; and a single leaf (Bargello 2065) was part of the art collection amassed by the Carrand family which they gifted in 1889 to the Museo Nazionale del Bargello, Florence. Another four fragments turned up in the twentieth century. One leaf (Clev. 1953) was auctioned in Berlin in 1930. It, and another two leaves (Egerton 3127 ff. 1–2v), were acquired by a German book dealer and on-sold. A single leaf (Egerton 3781) turned up in 1968 as part of the estate of an English Brigadier.

== Current Location of the Codex ==
- 1 leaf is at the Cleveland Museum, Cleveland, Ohio Wade Fund MS. n. 1953.152. "Treatise on the Vices, Acedia and Her Court"
- 1 leaf is at the Museo del Bargello, Florence MS. inv. 2065. "The fall of Acre"
- 25 leaves and cuttings are held by the British Library, London MSS. Additional 27695, 28441, Egerton 3127, 3781

== Subjects represented in the illustrations ==
- Fall of Tripoli (1289)
- The Fall of Acre
- Death of Philip IV of France

== Sources ==
- Chiara Concina, Francesca Fabbri (a cura di), Il manoscritto Cocharelli...in Medioevi, 6, 2020: http://www.medioevi.it/index.php/medioevi
- Chiara Concina. Unfolding the Cocharelli Codex: some preliminary observations about the text, with a theory about the order of the fragments
- Chiara Concina. The Cocharelli Codex as a Source for the History of the Latin East: The Fall of Tripoli and Acre
- R. Faunce, The Cocharelli Codex: Illuminating Virtue: a Fourteenth-century Father's Counsel to His Son, PhD Thesis, University of Melbourne, 2016.
