= Bohemond VII of Antioch =

Count of Tripoli and Prince of Antioch (1261-1287)(r. 1275-1287)

Bohemond VII (1261 – October 19, 1287) was the count of Tripoli and nominal prince of Antioch from 1275 to his death. The only part left of the Principality of Antioch was the port of Latakia. He spent much of his reign at war with the Templars (1277–1282).

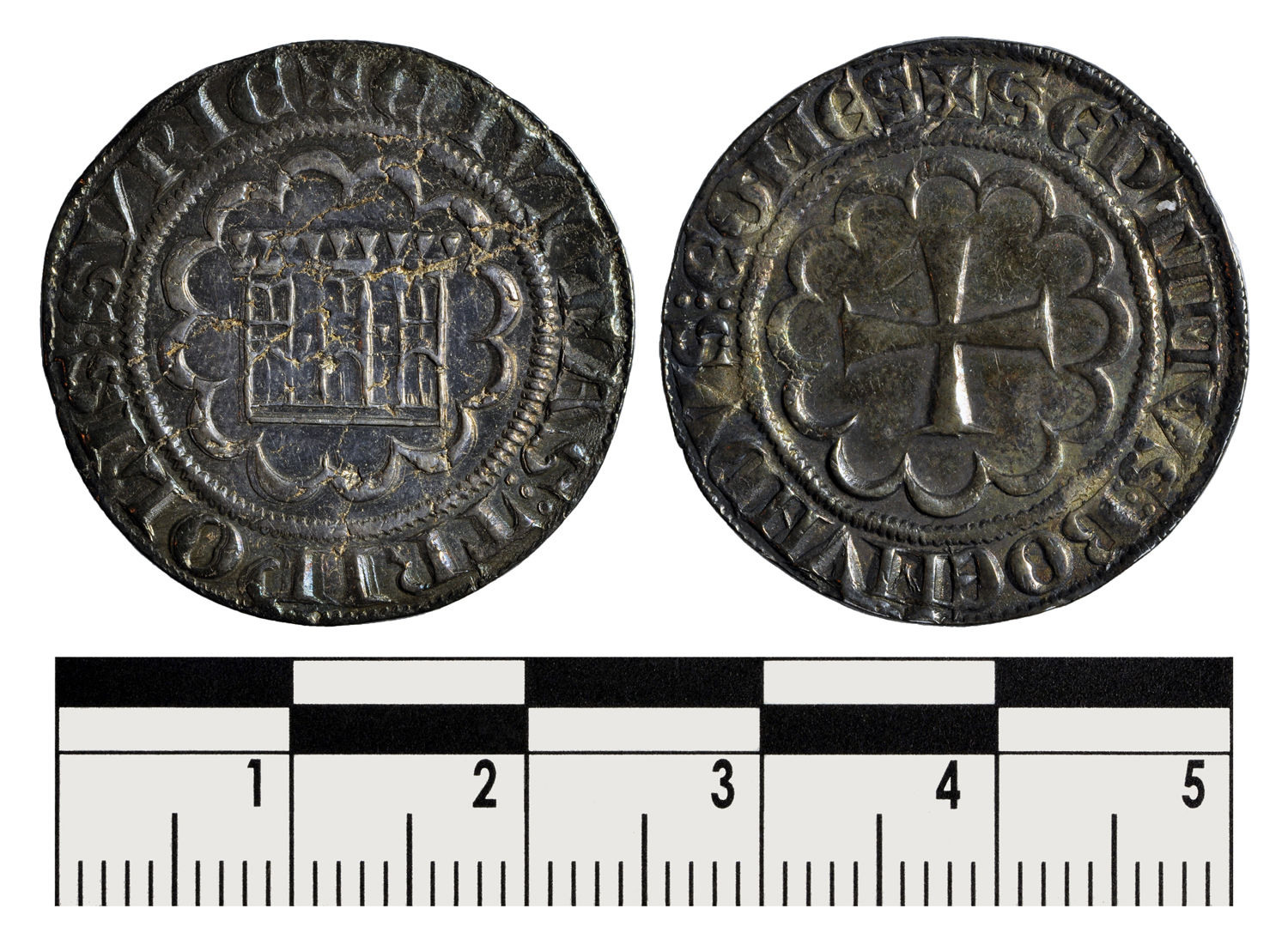
Silver coin issued during the reign of Bohemond VII (1275–1287). This coin weighs exactly the same as the French gros tournois. These intricate and beautiful coins were not long in circulation until Tripoli was surrendered to the Mamluks in 1289 and thus, were the last coins to be struck in the 'crusader states'.

Bohemond VII was the son of Bohemond VI of Antioch and his wife Sibylla of Armenia. As Bohemond VII was still underage at his succession, Sibylla acted as regent, although the regency was also unsuccessfully claimed by King Hugh III of Cyprus, the closest adult in the line of succession. Sibylla appointed Bishop Bartholomew of Tortosa to act as bailli. Bohemond spent his minority under the protection of his uncle King Leo III of Armenia at his court in Cilicia. He returned to Tripoli in 1277 and immediately made peace with Qalawun, the Mamluk sultan, and recognised Roger of San Severino as regent at Acre for Charles I of Anjou. He exempted the Venetians from harbour duties, thus distancing the Genoese and their allies.

Upon his return, he made enemies with the powerful Embriaco family, which governed Byblos through Guy II. Tripoli was very weak at this time and was divided among various factions: the Roman faction led by Paul of Segni, bishop of Tripoli, and the Armenian faction led by Sibylla and Bartholomew. Paul made friends with William of Beaujeu, the new grand master of the Knights Templar, and then with the normally anti-Templar Embriacos. This precipitated the first of a series of wars between Bohemond and the Templars. First, he burned their building in Tripoli. Then, the Templars responded by razing the comital castle of Botron and attacking Nephin. Bohemond marched on Byblos but was defeated and forced to sign a truce.

In 1278, Guy of Byblos and the Templars assaulted Tripoli, but were met outside the walls by Bohemond. Bohemond was defeated, but the Templar fleet of twelve galleys was scattered by a storm and Bohemond's fleet of fifteen attacked and damaged Templar Sidon. This time a truce was mediated by Nicolas Lorgne, grand master of the Hospital. The last conflict began in January 1282, when the Embriacos tried to take Tripoli by surprise. They found the Templar master away and so took refuge with the Hospitallers, who handed them over to Bohemond on condition that he would spare their lives. He buried them up to their necks in sand at Nephin and starved them to death. This last act further alienated the Genoese and John of Montfort, but Bohemond beat the latter in taking control of Byblos.

In 1287, Latakia was taken by Qalawun, who claimed that as part of Antioch it was not covered by the provisions of their treaty. Bohemond died soon after, leaving no children by his wife Margaret of Beaumont. Tripoli was plunged into a succession crisis until his sister Lucia arrived from Europe to take control of the county.

== Sources ==
- Setton, Kenneth M. (general editor) A History of the Crusades: Volume II — The Later Crusades, 1189 – 1311. Robert Lee Wolff and Harry W. Hazard, editors. University of Wisconsin Press: Milwaukee, 1969.
- Richard, Jean (1999). The Crusades: c. 1071-c. 1291. Cambridge University Press. ISBN 978-0-521-62566-1.
- Aboujaoude, Boulos (Fr.), "History of Aboujaoude Family", Catholic Press, Lebanon 1976.

Preceded by Bohemond VI of Antioch	Count of Tripoli; 1275–1287	Succeeded by Lucia of Tripoli
