= Siege of Antioch (1268) =

Part of the Crusades

Coordinates: 36.2000°N 36.1500°E

- Part of the Crusades
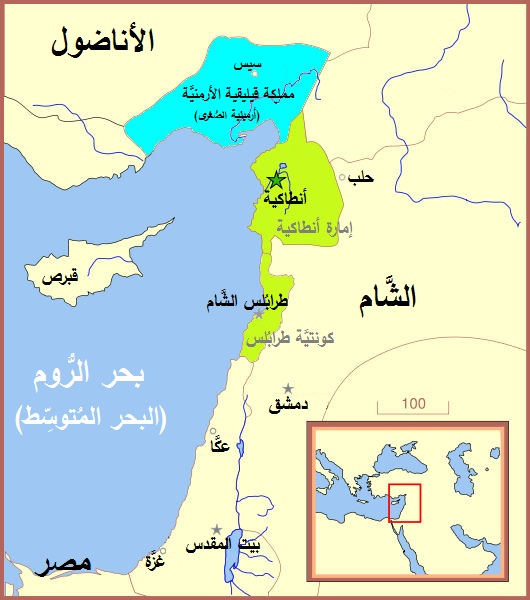
- Map of Little Armenia (blue), Principality of Antioch (green-upper) and Tripoli (green-lower) in Masry
Date	May 1268
Location	Antioch (modern-day Antakya, Hatay, Turkey)
Result	Mamluk victory

Belligerents
Mamluk Sultanate	Principality of Antioch

Commanders and leaders
Baybars	Bohemond VI; Simon Mansel (POW)

Strength
Approx. 15,000	Approx. 7,500

Casualties and losses
Unknown	17,000 killed 100,000 enslaved

The siege of Antioch occurred in 1268 when the Mamluk Sultanate under Baybars finally succeeded in capturing the city of Antioch. Prior to the siege, the Crusader Principality was oblivious to the loss of the city, as demonstrated when Baybars sent negotiators to the leader of the former Crusader state and mocked his use of "Prince" in the title Prince of Antioch.

== Prelude to the siege ==
In 1260, Baybars, the Sultan of Egypt and Syria, began to threaten the Principality of Antioch, a Crusader state, which (as a vassal of the Armenians) had supported the Mongols. In 1265, Baybars took Caesarea, Haifa and Arsuf. A year later, Baybars conquered Galilee and devastated Cilician Armenia.

As Steven Runciman relates in his last book about the Crusades, decades before the siege of Antioch (1268), prince Bohemond IV of Antioch had settled his court in the city of Tripoli, capital of his other state, the County of Tripoli. In 1268, the Antiochene knights and garrison were under the command of Simon Mansel, Constable of Antioch, whose wife was an Armenian woman who was related to Sibylla of Armenia, wife of prince Bohemond VI.

== Siege of Antioch ==
In 1268, Baybars besieged the city of Antioch, which was "badly defended by its patriarch and abandoned by most of its inhabitants," capturing it on 18 May (the citadel fell two days later) after a relatively feeble defense. Antioch had been weakened by its previous struggles with Armenia and by internal power struggles, and its inhabitants were quick to agree to a surrender, on the condition that the lives of the citizens within the walls would be spared.

Before Baybars' forces laid siege to Antioch, the Constable Simon Mansel, along with a group of knights, led an unsuccessful attack against the Muslim army in order to prevent the city from being encircled. The defenses were in good condition, but the garrison was unable to defend the long walls of the city. Mansel was captured during the Antiochene cavalry attack, and Baybars ordered him to command his lieutenants in Antioch to surrender immediately. The garrison refused to capitulate, and continued the defense of the walls.

Afterwards, lamenting that Antioch's ruler had not been present either for the siege or for the ransacking and murder, Baybars' secretary (who was also his biographer) wrote a detailed letter describing exactly what had been done to the people and the city:

Death came among the besieged from all sides and by all roads: we killed all that thou hadst appointed to guard the city or defend its approaches. If thou hadst seen thy knights trampled under the feet of the horses, thy provinces given up to pillage, thy riches distributed by measures full, the wives of thy subjects put to public sale; if thou hadst seen the pulpits and crosses overturned, the leaves of the Gospel torn and cast to the winds, and the sepulchres of thy patriarchs profaned; if thou hadst seen thy enemies, the Mussulmans trampling upon the tabernacle, and immolating in the sanctuary, monk, priest and deacon; in short, if thou hadst seen thy palaces given up to the flames, the dead devoured by the fire of this world, the Church of St Paul and that of St Peter completely and entirely destroyed, certes, thou wouldst have cried out "Would to Heaven that I were become dust!" . (Michaud, 1853)

Michaud after quoting the letter of Baybars concludes the sacking thus:

Baybars distributed the booty among his soldiers, the Mamelukes reserving as their portion the women girls and children [...] A little boy was worth twelve dirhems, a little girl five dirhems. In a single day the city of Antioch lost all its inhabitants and a conflagration lighted by order of Bibars completed the work of the barbarians. Most historians agree in saying that seventeen thousand Christians were slaughtered, and a hundred thousand dragged away into slavery.

Historian Thomas Madden concludes that the events and destruction following the siege of Antioch, "was the single greatest massacre of the entire crusading era."

In addition, Ibn al-Furat also reported what happened:

The troops surrounded the whole city and the citadel. The people of Antioch fought fiercely, but the Muslims scaled the walls by the mountain (Mt. Silpius) near the citadel and came down into the city. The people fled to the citadel, and the Muslim troops started to plunder, kill and take prisoners. Every man in the city was put to the sword – they numbered more than a hundred thousand.

== Aftermath ==
For three days Antioch was sacked, in which 17,000 persons were killed and 100,000 taken prisoners. 8,000 took refuge in the castle, but eventually surrendered. Baybars had the fortress burned, and the churches of St. Paul and St. Peter, and the other churches were destroyed or left in ruins. The monastery of Saint Simeon Stylites the Younger outside Antioch was also destroyed during the campaign.

The Hospitaller fortress Krak des Chevaliers fell three years later. While Louis IX of France launched the Eighth Crusade ostensibly to reverse these setbacks, it went to Tunis, instead of Constantinople, as Louis' brother, Charles of Anjou, had initially advised, though Charles I clearly benefited from the treaty between Antioch and Tunis that ultimately resulted from the Crusade.

By the time of his death in 1277, Baybars had confined the Crusaders to a few strongholds along the coast and they were forced out of the Middle East by the beginning of the 14th century. The fall of Antioch was to prove as detrimental to the crusaders' cause as its capture was instrumental in the initial success of the First Crusade.

== Sources ==
- Bouchier, E. S. (1921). A Short History of Antioch : 3OO B.C. – A.D. 1268 (PDF). Oxford: Basil Blackwell.
- Folda, Jaroslav (2005). Crusader art in the Holy Land : from the Third Crusade to the fall of Acre, 1187–1291. Cambridge University Press. ISBN 9780521835831.
