= Latin Diocese of Tortosa in Syria =

Roman Catholic diocese in Syria (c. 1128-c. 1291)

Latin Diocese of Tortosa in Syria was a Roman Catholic diocese established in the Syrian city of Tartus after the First Crusade. It had a resident bishop between 1128 and 1291. The cathedral of Tortosa became the site of a Marian shrine.

== History ==
There had not existed a Greek Orthodox see of Tortosa. The diocese was formed by combining three Orthodox sees that had existed in the 10th century: Antarados, Arados and Maraclea. Traditionally, these were the northernmost suffragans of the archdiocese of Tyre within the patriarchate of Antioch. Under Crusader rule, it fell within the County of Tripoli. The first Latin bishop was appointed by Patriarch Bernard of Valence in 1127 or 1128 under his direct jurisdiction, which caused a lengthy dispute with the archbishops of Tyre. In 1138, Pope Innocent II absolved the bishop of Tortosa of his oath of obedience to the patriarch of Antioch and ordered him to submit to the archbishop of Tyre, Fulk.

In 1152, Tortosa was briefly occupied by the troops of Emir Nur al-Din. In response, Bishop William I hired the Knights Templar to defend the cathedral in exchange for ecclesiastical privileges. In the agreement with the Templars, the bishop reserved for himself only the church of Maraclea and the churches of Tortosa and its port, with the exception of the castle chapel. In all other churches in the diocese, save those that already belonged to the Knights Hospitaller, the Templars were to exercise parochial rights. From this point on, most of the diocese was effectively controlled by the Templars, staffed by its priests and not paying tithes to the bishop. This control, however, was limited to rural areas and was probably lesser in fact than it appears in the surviving agreement. The Templars successfully held out in the citadel against the attacks of Saladin in 1188.

When Patriarch Peter of Lucedio was too ill to attend the Fourth Lateran Council in November 1215, he sent the bishop of Tripoli in his stead. That same year, he pledged an ecclesiastical estate to the Templars for 1,500 bezants. In 1225, the bishop complained to the pope that the Templars had violated the agreement of 1152.

In 1251, the bishop complained to the pope that the Hospitallers were not paying tithes on certain properties. The bishop may have been claiming the tithes of properties in the vacant diocese of Raphanea. In 1255, Pope Alexander IV exempted the Hospitallers from paying tithes on those lands. Alexander also ruled on the practice of the bishop of Tortosa of paying his canons salaries while retaining control their prebends. He allowed the policy except in the case of the archdeacon, who was to be given control of his prebend.

In 1263, Pope Urban IV reversed Alexander's decision and united the diocese of Raphanea to Tortosa, allowing the bishop to claim tithes from what lands of the former remained under Crusader control. As a restul of Urban's decision, the Hospitallers reached an agreement whereby they paid 1,500 bezants in arrears and promised 1,000 bezants yearly in lieu of tithes. The bishops of Tortosa, through successful lawsuits, sound estate management and the Marian shrine, retained solid finances throughout the 13th century.

By 1267 at the latest, the bishop of Tortosa had appointed vicars to oversee the Greek Catholic communities under his charge and make sure that their churches were built according to appropriate Greek plans. In that year, Bishop William III asked the Hospitallers to help him enforce the Roman obedience on the Greek churches, evidently those of the Orthodox persuasion. To judge from the wording of his letter, there may have been Orthodox archbishops and bishops within his diocese at that time. Although the Latin church in the Crusader states always claimed authority over the Orthodox church, it did not always enforce conformity with Latin practices and doctrines.

In 1268, Sultan Baybars I captured Antioch. The archdeacon and patriarchal vicar at the time, Bartholomew Mansel, escaped the sack. He was appointed bishop of Tortosa when that see fell vacant in 1272. This created an awkward situation, since the patriarchal vicar chose to reside in the most important city left in the patriarchate, Tripoli. This led to conflict with the bishop of Tripoli, Paul of Segni. Tortosa ceased to be a residential bishopric in 1291. On 3 August, the Templars and Bartholomew evacuated the city.

== Cathedral ==
The cathedral was the site of a major shrine to the Virgin Mary, the only such cathedral shrine in the patriarchate of Antioch. It was the only centre of pilgrimage in the northern Crusader states, and gifts from pilgrims were an important source of revenue. By the 13th century, it had even acquired property at Treviso in Italy. In 1213, Raymond, the eldest son of Prince Bohemond IV of Antioch, was murdered by the Assassins in the cathedral.

== List of bishops ==
Dates are floruits.

- anonymous (February 1128)
- William I (1142–1152)
- William II (1247)
- William III (1263–c. 1268)
- Bartholomew Mansel (c. 1272–c. 1292)

== Bibliography ==
- Cahen, Claude (1940). La Syrie du nord à l'époque des croisades et la principauté franque d'Antioche. Études arabes, médiévales et modernes. P. Geuthner. ISBN 9782351594186.
- Hamilton, Bernard (1980). The Latin Church in the Crusader States: The Secular Church. Ashgate.
- Jotischky, Andrew (2002). The Carmelites and Antiquity: Mendicants and their Pasts in the Middle Ages. Oxford University Press.
- Riley-Smith, Jonathan (1969). "The Templars and the Castle of Tortosa in Syria: An Unknown Document concerning the Acquisition of the Fortress". The English Historical Review. 84 (331): 278–288. doi:10.1093/ehr/LXXXIV.CCCXXXI.278. JSTOR 564521.
