= Count of Tripoli =

Ruler of the County of Tripoli, 1102–1289

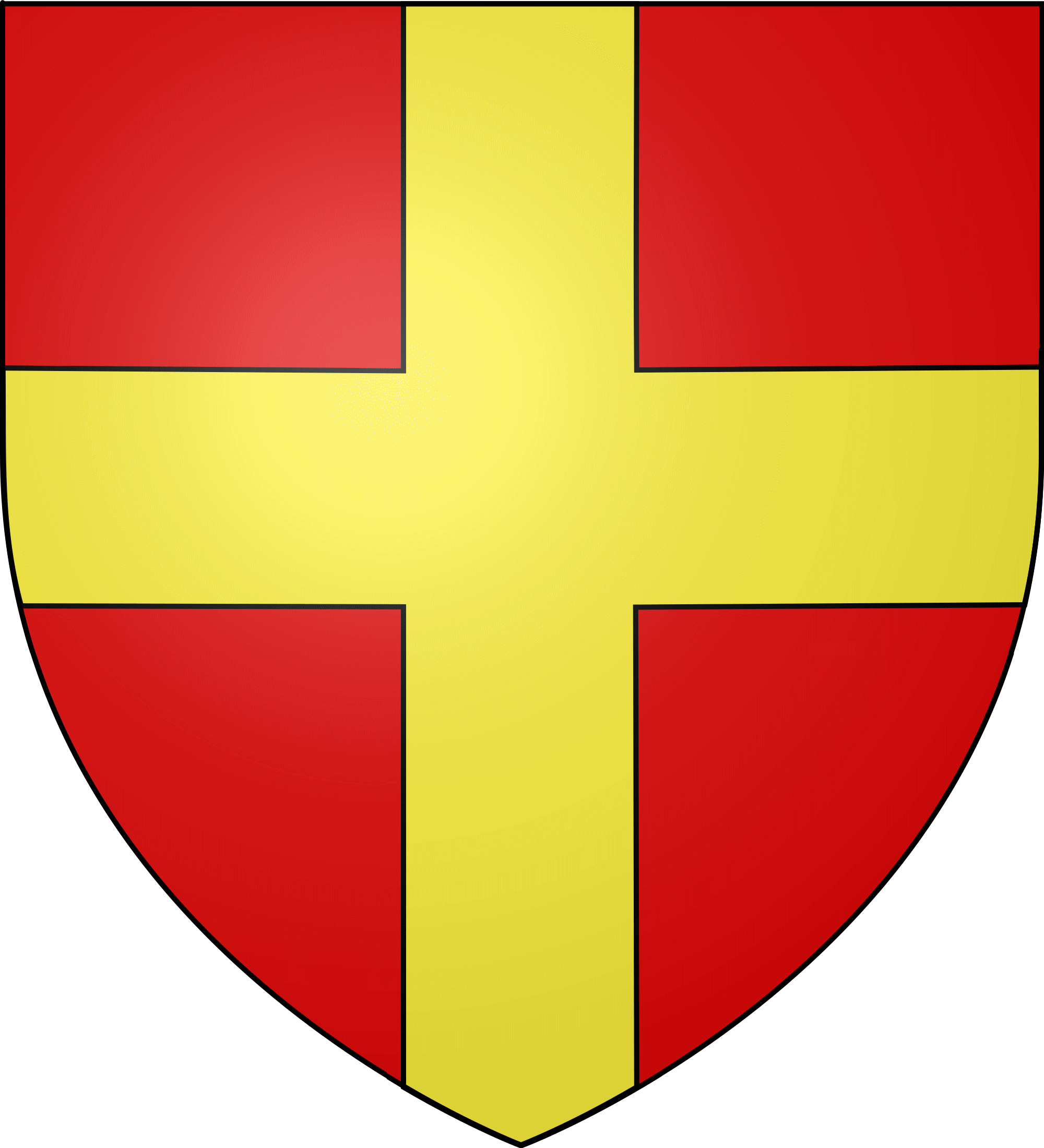
Coat of arms of the House of Toulouse-Tripoli

Attributed arms of the County of Tripoli

The count of Tripoli was the ruler of the County of Tripoli, a crusader state from 1102 through to 1289. Of the four major crusader states in the Levant, Tripoli was created last.

The history of the counts of Tripoli began with Raymond IV of Toulouse, who led the Siege of Tripoli. The first count was his son Bertrand, who pushed his claim over that of his cousin William II Jordan of Berga and Cerdenya. After the death of Raymond III shortly after the Battle of Hattin, the title of count of Tripoli was passed to the princes of Antioch until the fall of the city in 1289.

Count Raymond IV of Toulouse, one of the leaders of the First Crusade, founded the county in 1102 during a lengthy war with the Banu Ammar emirs of Tripoli (theoretically vassals of the Fatimid caliphs in Cairo). The county gradually grew as the crusaders seized much of their territory and besieged Banu Ammar within Tripoli itself. Raymond died in 1105, leaving his infant son Alfonso-Jordan as his heir, with a cousin, William-Jordan of Cerdenya, as regent. William-Jordan continued the siege of Tripoli until 1109, when the elder son of Raymond, Bertrand arrived in the east, leaving Toulouse to Alfonso-Jordan and his mother, who returned to France. Bertrand and William-Jordan, with mediation from King Baldwin I of Jerusalem, came to an agreement whereby each would keep control of their own conquests. Bertrand captured Tripoli later that year. When William-Jordan died a few months later Bertrand became sole ruler.

The county of Tripoli continued to exist as a vassal state of the Kingdom of Jerusalem. Count Raymond III, who reigned from 1152 to 1187, was an important figure in the history of the Kingdom to the south due to his close relationship to its kings (his mother Hodierna was a daughter of Baldwin II of Jerusalem) and to his own position as Prince of Galilee through his wife. He acted twice as Regent for the kingdom, first for the young Baldwin IV from 1174 to 1177, and then again for Baldwin V from 1185 to 1186. He also acted as the leader of the local nobility in their opposition to Baldwin IV's Courtenay relations with the Knights Templar, Guy of Lusignan, and Reynald of Châtillon. Raymond unsuccessfully argued in favor of peace with Saladin, but, ironically, it was Saladin's siege of Raymond's Countess in Tiberias that led the Crusader army into Galilee before its defeat at Hattin in 1187. Although Raymond survived the battle, he died soon afterward.

Despite the Muslim leader's string of victories, the county avoided being conquered by Saladin. Bohemond IV, second son of Bohemond III of Antioch, succeeded to the Countship upon Raymond's death. After Bohemond III died in 1201, the county was in personal union with Antioch for all but three years (1216–1219) until Antioch's fall to the Mamluks in 1268. Tripoli survived for a few more years.

The death of the unpopular Count Bohemond VII in 1287 led to a dispute between his heir, his sister Lucia, and the city's commune, which put itself under the protection of the Genoese. Eventually, Lucia came to an agreement with the Genoese and the Commune, which displeased the Venetians and the ambitious Bartholomew Embriaco, the Genoese mayor of the city, who called in the Mameluke Sultan Qalawun to their aid. Qalawun razed the city after a siege in 1289, bringing the history of the county to an end.

== Counts of Tripoli, 1102–1289 ==
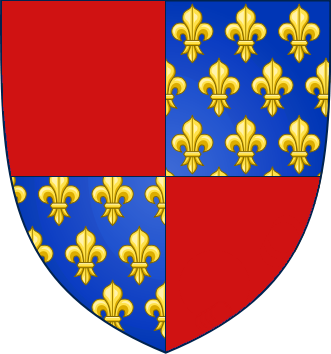
Coat of arms of the House of Poitiers-Antioch

- Raymond I (1102–1105)
- Alfonso Jordan (1105–1109)
  - William II Jordan, regent (1105–1109)
- Bertrand (1109–1112)
- Pons (1112–1137)
- Raymond II (1137–1152)
- Raymond III (1152–1187)
- Raymond IV (1187–1189)
- Bohemond I (1189–1233, also IV Prince of Antioch 1201–1216 and 1219–1233)
- Bohemond II (1233–1252, also V Prince of Antioch)
- Bohemond III (1252–1275, also VI Prince of Antioch 1252–1268)
- Bohemond IV (1275–1287)
- Lucia (1287–1289)
