= County of Tripoli =

Crusader state in the Levant from 1102 to 1289

County of Tripoli Comitatus Tripolitanus (Latin) Comtat de Trípol (Old Provençal)
- 1102–1289
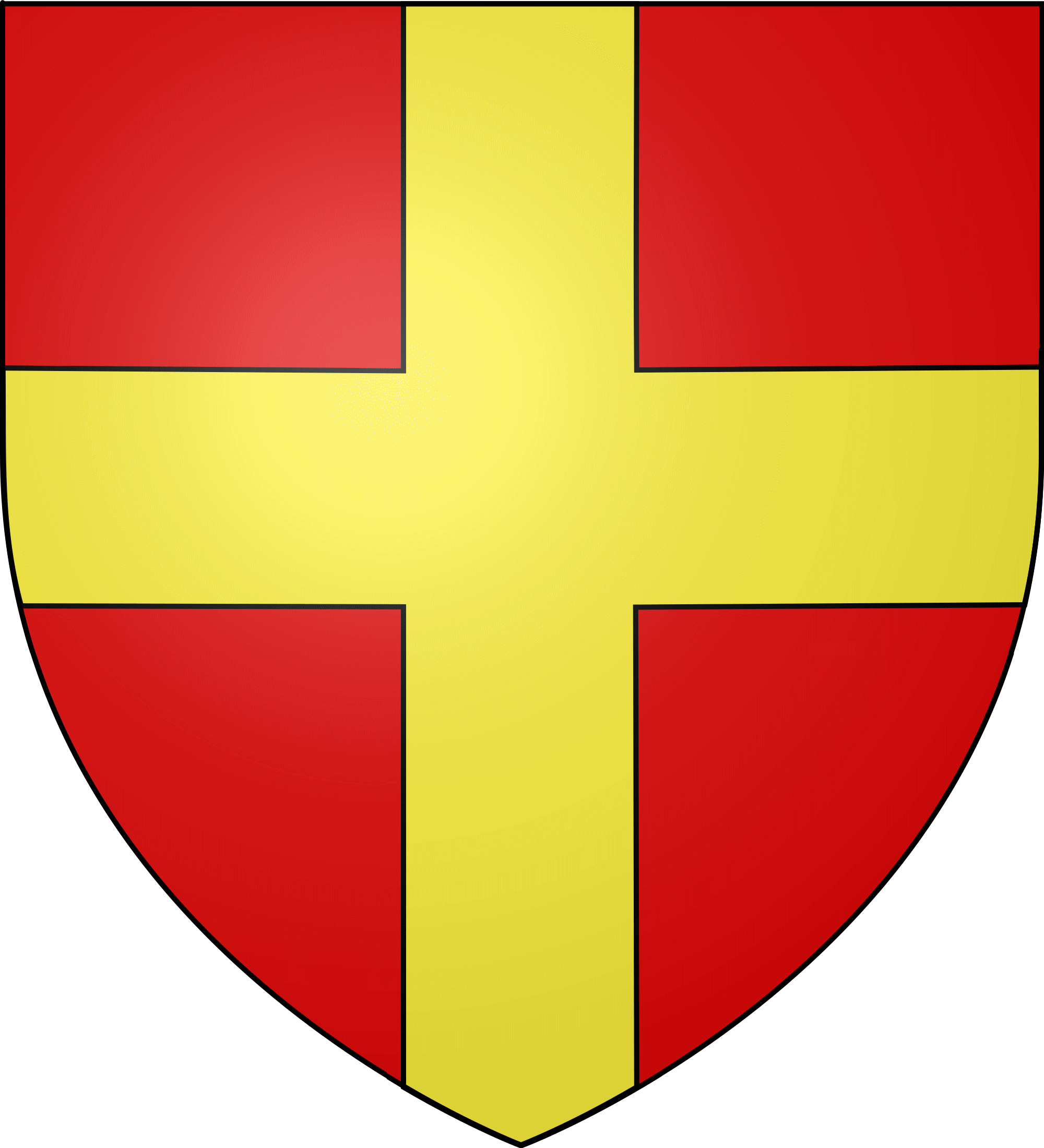
- Banner of arms of the House of Toulouse-Tripoli (derived from the arms) Arms of the House of Toulouse-Tripoli

- Attributed arms of the County of Tripoli

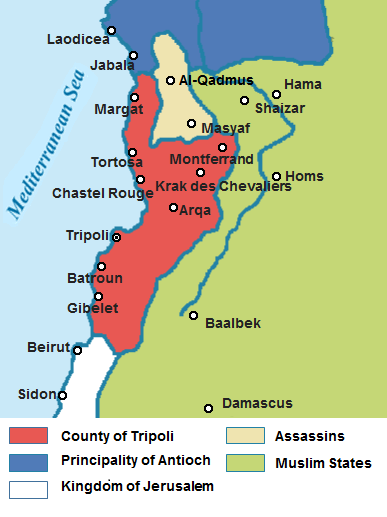
- The County of Tripoli in the context of the other states of the Near East in 1135 AD.
- Status: Vassal of, the Kingdom of Jerusalem, the Principality of Antioch and the Mongol Empire
- Capital: Tortosa (1102–1109), Tripoli (1109–1289)
- Common languages: Latin, Aramaic, Old French, Old Occitan, Italian, Arabic, Greek, Sabir
- Religion: Latin Church (among nobles); Maronite Church and Eastern Orthodox Church (among general populace); Oriental Orthodoxy, Islam, and Judaism minority
- Government: Feudal monarchy
- Count of Tripoli
  - 1102–1105 (first): Raymond I
  - 1287–1289 (last): Lucia
- Historical era: High Middle Ages
  - Established: 1102
  - Conquered by Qalawun: 27 April 1289
Preceded by	Succeeded by
Banu Ammar; Fatimid Caliphate	Mamluk Sultanate
- Today part of: Lebanon; Syria

The County of Tripoli (1102–1289) was one of the Crusader states. It was founded in the Levant in the modern-day region of Tripoli, northern Lebanon and parts of northwestern Syria. When the Frankish Crusaders, mostly southern French forces – captured the region in 1109, Bertrand of Toulouse became the first count of Tripoli as a vassal of King Baldwin I of Jerusalem. From that time on, the rule of the county was decided not strictly by inheritance but by factors such as military force (external and civil war), favour and negotiation. In 1289, the County of Tripoli fell to the Muslim Mamluks of Cairo under Sultan Qalawun, and the county was absorbed into Mamluk Sultanate.

== Capture by Christian forces ==
Raymond IV of Toulouse was one of the wealthiest and most powerful of the crusaders. Even so, after the First Crusade, he had failed to secure any land holdings in the Near East. Meanwhile, the County of Edessa, the Kingdom of Jerusalem and the Principality of Antioch had been established. Tripoli was an important strategic goal as it linked the French in the south with the Normans in the north. It was a fertile and well populated area. In 1102, Raymond IV occupied Tortosa (now Tartus) and in 1103, he prepared, together with veterans of the 1101 crusade, to take Tripoli.

=== Citadel of Tripoli ===
On a natural ridge, which he named "Mons Peregrinus" (French: Mont Pèlerin, English: Mount Pilgrim), 3 kilometres (1.9 mi) from Tripoli, Raymond IV (also known as Raymond de Saint-Gilles) began the construction of a large fortress, the Citadel of Tripoli (Arabic: قلعة طرابلس Qalʻat Ṭarābulus), formerly also known as the "Castle of Saint-Gilles" (Arabic: قلعة سان جيل Qalʻat Sān Jīl). Despite this new fortress and seasoned troops, Raymond IV's siege of Tripoli failed to secure the port. He died on 25 February 1105.

=== Succession ===
Count William of Cerdagne, Raymond IV's cousin and comrade, was supported by Tancred, Prince of Galilee, but his succession in the Tripoli campaign was challenged by Raymond IV's illegitimate son, Bertrand of Toulouse. Bertrand of Toulouse, who was supported by Baldwin I of Jerusalem, arrived in the Near East with a substantial army and a large Genoese fleet. In order to resolve the succession issue, Baldwin I created a partition treaty. It specified that William was to hold northern Tripoli and pay homage to Tancred, while Bertrand was to hold south Tripoli as a vassal of Baldwin. Under a united Christian onslaught, Tripoli fell on 12 July 1109, completing the Kingdom of Jerusalem. When William died of an arrow through the heart (some claim it was murder), Bertrand became the first count of Tripoli.

== Structure and devolution of power ==
=== Holdings and vassals ===
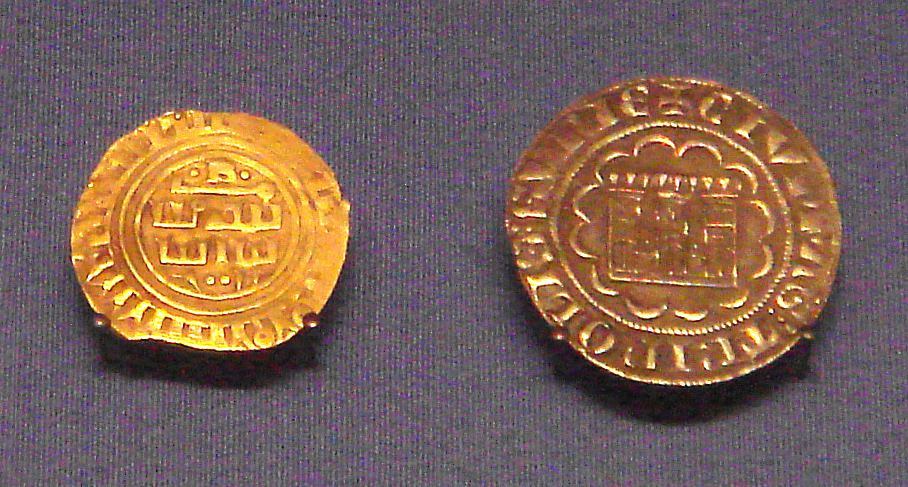
County of Tripoli coins: gold bezant with a text in Arabic (1270–1300), and Tripoli silver gros (1275–1287). British Museum.

The extent of the County of Tripoli was determined in part by pre-existing Byzantine borders and in part by victory in battle, tempered by the demands of neighbouring crusader states. At its height, the county controlled the coastline from Maraclea in the north to Beirut in the south. Inland, the county's control extended to the Krac des Chevaliers fortress. The rich inland agricultural land of the Homs Gap was known as La Bocquée. The county was divided into 'lordships'; areas based roughly around its coastal ports. The count of Tripoli himself held the port of Tripoli and its surrounds. He also controlled the hostile region of Montferrand, now modern-day Bar'in, Syria, lying to the east. Approximately one quarter of the land seized around Tripoli was given to the Genoese as payment for military aid. The Genoese admiral Guglielmo Embriaco was awarded the city of Byblos.

=== Homage to the king ===
The County of Tripoli was an autonomous state. Despite his contribution to its establishment, Baldwin I did not directly control the County of Tripoli. Nevertheless, the County of Tripoli owed fealty (allegiance) and homage (declarations of allegiance) to him, and he, in return, provided support to the county in times of trouble.

=== Defence ===
Although occupying a narrow coastal plain, the mountain range beyond was a natural defensive line for Tripoli. Several castle forts were built to defend the mountain passes. Muslim forces (Turk and Egyptian) attacked the County of Tripoli along its borders, especially those to the east. In 1137, Raymond II, the reigning count, lost control of Montferrand. The Muslim position strengthened when the Hashshashin (Nizari Ismailis) forces formed in the Nosairi mountains to the north. In 1144, in order to increase the county's defences, particularly against Zangi of Mosul, Raymond II gave the Knights Hospitaller large stretches of frontier land along the Buqai'ah plain. This included the castles of Krak des Chevaliers, Anaz, Tell Kalakh, Qalaat el Felis and Mardabech. In the 1150s, the defences were further strengthened by the presence of the Knights Templar at Tartus on the seashore.

=== Religion ===
In religious matters, the counties of the Kingdom of Jerusalem were expected to follow the lead of the Latin patriarch of Jerusalem. However, Count Pons had formed an alliance with Antioch, and acknowledged the Latin patriarch of Antioch. This was so even after a papal edict to the contrary.

== War with the Seljuk Empire ==
Shaizar

As a vassal of the kings of Jerusalem, Bertrand of Tripoli was drawn into war with the Seljuk Turks. In 1111, Mawdud, a Turkish military leader, campaigned against Antioch and Edessa. Count Bertrand of Tripoli and King Baldwin I of Jerusalem marched to defend the Christians in the north. In joining Prince Tancred of Galilee and Count Baldwin II of Edessa at the Battle of Shaizar, their defence of the kingdom was successful.

Hab

In 1119, the Seljuk Empire again attacked Antioch, winning the Battle of Ager Sanguinis. However, Count Pons of Tripoli and Baldwin II defended Antioch and, at the Battle of Hab, successfully defended the flank of the Christian forces.

Azaz

In 1125, Count Pons of Tripoli marched against the Turks who had again attacked Edessa, this time besieging the town of Azaz. Pons of Tripoli, Baldwin II and Count Joscelin I of Edessa lured the Turks from Azaz and into an ambush on the plains, where the Turkish forces were defeated.

== Earthquake of 1170 ==
On 29 June 1170, an earthquake struck the region. The defensive forts of Krac des Chevaliers, Chastel Blanc and al-'Ariymah were damaged. The cathedral of St Mary in Tripoli township was destroyed. The earthquake of 1170 resulted in a brief truce between Nur al-Din and the county (unlike a previous less severe earthquake of 1157 where fighting continued).

== Contenders ==
=== Bertrand of Toulouse, son of Alphonso-Jordan ===
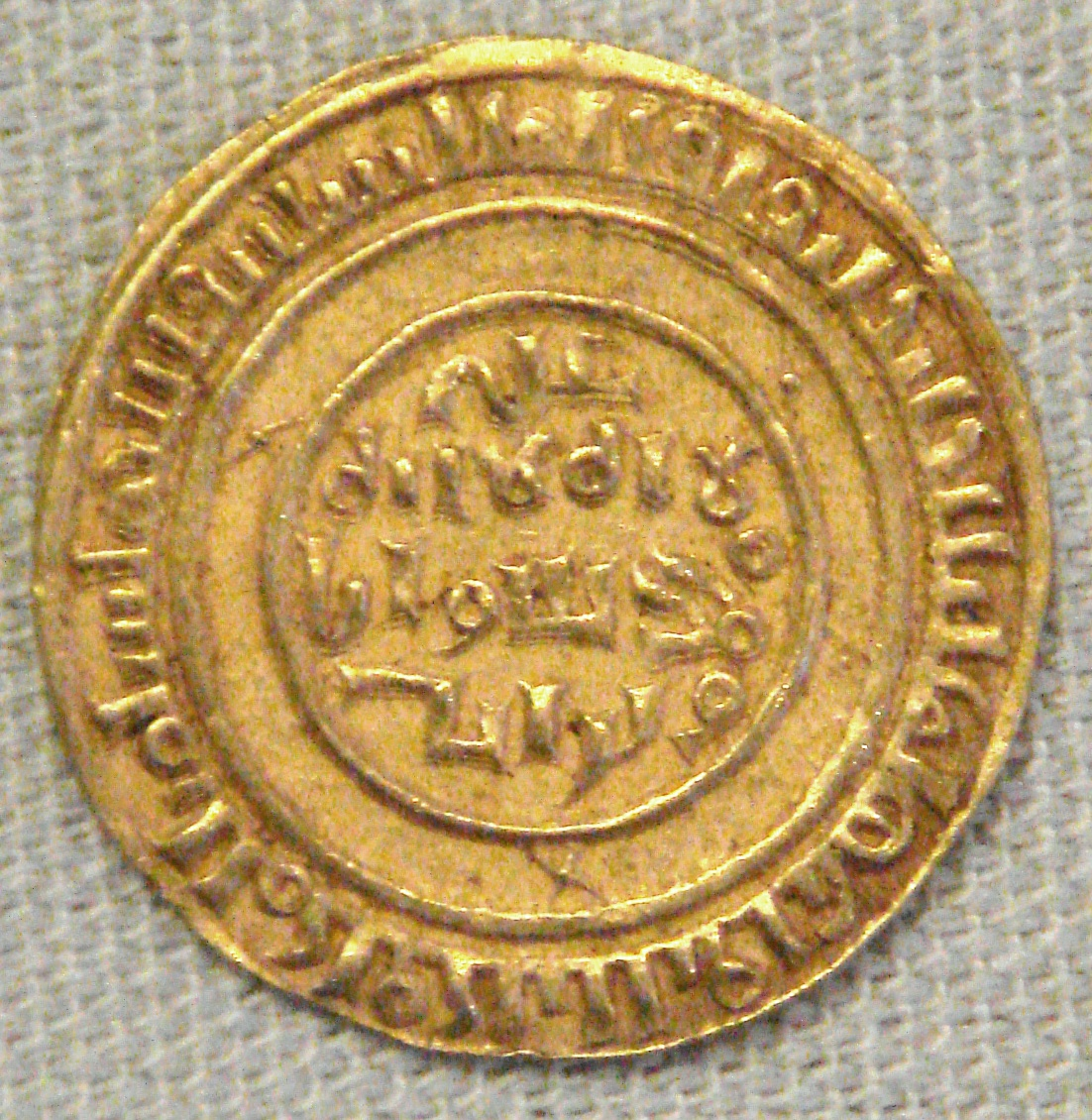
Crusader coin, County of Tripoli, c. 1230.

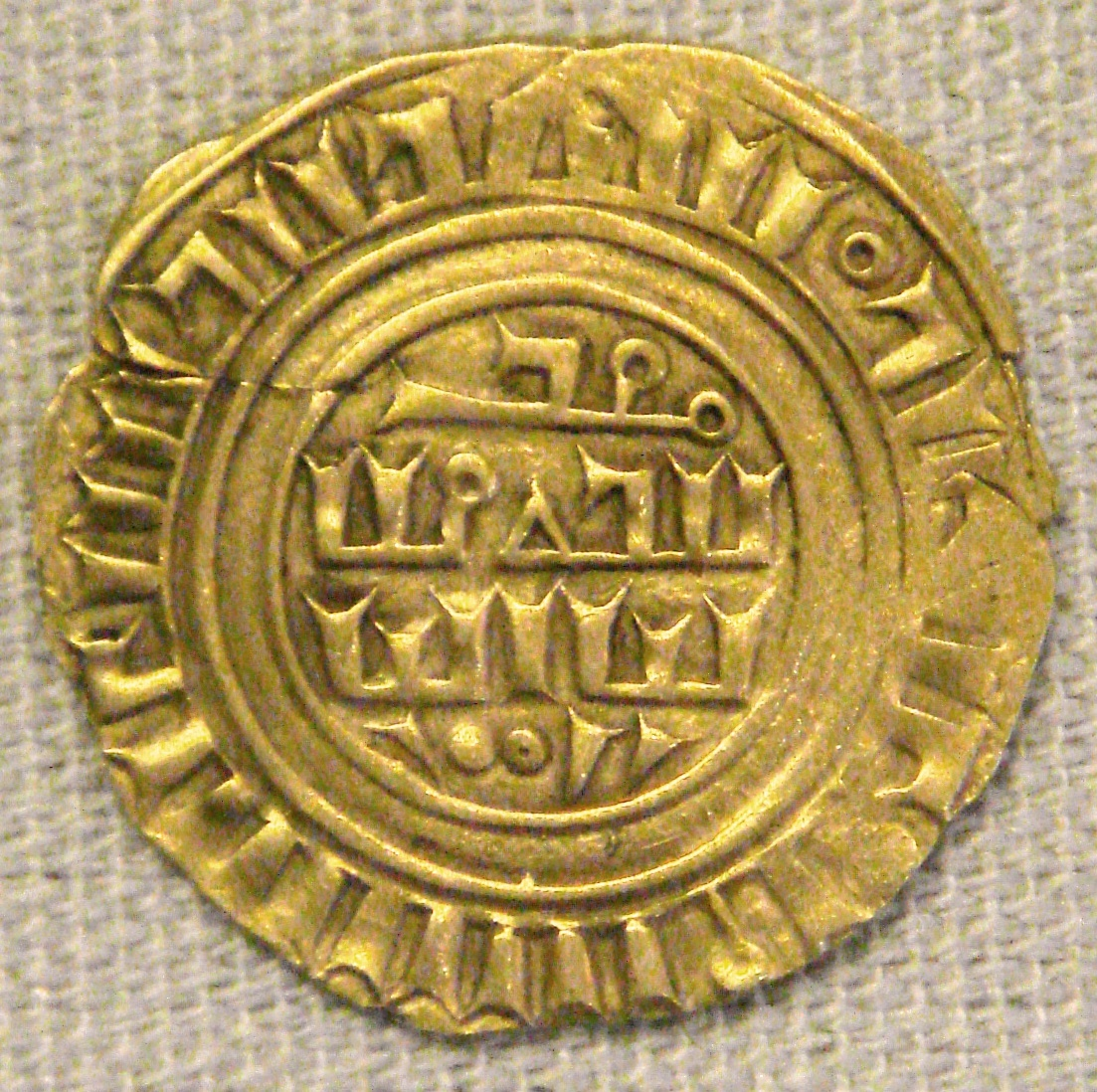
Crusader coin, County of Tripoli, c. 1230.

Alfonso Jordan (1103–1148) was the son of Raymond IV and his third wife, Elvira of Castile. Although he was born in Tripoli, Alphonso-Jordan was raised in France. In 1147, he joined the Second Crusade, which was launched in response to the loss of the County of Edessa to Turkish forces. Alphonso died, possibly poisoned, in Caesarea, in 1148. He had an illegitimate son, Bertrand of Toulouse, who continued his progress towards Tripoli. Count Raymond II (1115–1152), the grandson of Bertrand, Count of Tripoli, engaged his enemies, Nur al-Din and Unur of Damascus, to confront his cousin, Bertrand. The Turkish forces, having only recently battled Raymond II at the Siege of Damascus, attacked the castle of Arima (al-Ariymah). They captured Bertrand of Toulouse, who spent the following decade in Muslim prisons. He was released in 1159 following the intervention of Manuel Komnenos, emperor of Byzantium. Raymond II later regained Arima. In 1152, Raymond II was killed by the Assassins. He was the first recorded non-Muslim victim of this sect.

=== Guy II Embriaco ===
Bohemond VII (1261 – 19 October 1287) was Count of Tripoli and the nominal Prince of Antioch from 1275 until his death. From 1275 to 1277, Bartholomew, Bishop of Tortosa, was Bohemond VII's regent. Paul of Segni, Bishop of Tripoli, who was a friend of the Templar Grandmaster, William of Beaujeu, opposed the succession of Bohemond VII. Ernoul wrote, "This was the beginning of war between Bohemond VII and the Templars."

Guy II Embriaco (1277–1282) was a former vassal of Bohemond VII in Gibelet (Byblos). Grievances between them had led to enmity and this was part of a larger trade war between Genoa and the Venetians. The Templars sought to unseat Bohemond VII by supporting Guy II Embriaco. Bohemond VII responded by sacking the Templar house in Tripoli and forests at Montroque. This action led to indecisive fighting over the following months at Botron, Fort Nephin, Sidon and at sea. In 1282, Guy II Embriaco and the Templars were ambushed in Tripoli. Guy, his brothers, and cousins were imprisoned at Fort Nephin and left to starve; his followers were blinded and the Templars were summarily executed.

=== Benedetto I Zaccaria ===
After the death of Bohemond VII in 1287, the resulting power vacuum moved the lords of the County of Tripoli to offer Benedetto I Zaccaria (1235–1307), a powerful Genoese merchant, control of the county. In Tripoli, a special non-aristocratic social status had been granted to people from the great mercantile cities of Europe, especially those from the maritime republics of Italy (e.g., Venice). The communes elected Bartholomew Embriaco to the role of Mayor of Tripoli. He also promoted trade with the Genoese. Bohemond VII had no issue. His mother, Sibylla of Armenia, was discounted in the succession because she was the friend of Bishop Bartholomew of Tortosa, considered an enemy of Tripoli. Bohemond VII's younger sister, Lucie, established herself at Fort Nephin with the support of the Knights Hospitaller. Eventually, Bartholomew Embriaco and the communes decided they could not rule, while Benedetto I Zaccario declined the countship. Thus, after negotiations, Lucie became Lucia, Countess of Tripoli in 1288.

== Fall to the Muslims ==
Constant infighting, lack of resources, a series of poor harvests, changes to trade routes and the local economy and Muslim and Mongol military pressure led to the decline of the Kingdom of Jerusalem. By the 1280s, the kingdom had been reduced to just the cities of Acre, Tyre and Beirut, and the County of Tripoli was the only other surviving Crusader state. Although the Mamluk government of Egypt had a treaty with the county, in March 1289, Tripoli negotiated an alliance with the Mongols. Sultan Qalawun of Egypt responded by attacking Tripoli. Despite desperate defense operations, the county fell and was merged with Qalawun's empire.

== Vassals of Tripoli ==
- County of Montferrand
- Lordship of Besmedin
- Lordship of Botron
- Lordship of Buissera
- Lordship of Calmont
- Lordship of Chastel Blanc
- Lordship of Chastel Rouge
- Lordship of Fontaines
- Lordship of Gibelacar
- Lordship of Gibeletto
- Lordship of La Colée
- Lordship of Le Puy
- Seigneury of Moinetre
- Lordship of Nephin
- Lordship of Raisagium Montanée
- Lordship of Terra Galifa
- Lordship of Tokle
- Lordship of Tortosa Maraclea
- Krak des Chevaliers

== Counts of Tripoli ==
- Raymond I (1102–1105, also Count of Toulouse as Raymond IV)
- Alfonso Jordan (1105–1109), with William Jordan as regent
- Bertrand (1109–1112)
- Pons (1112–1137)
- Raymond II (1137–1152)
- Raymond III (1152–1187)
- Raymond IV (1187–1189), son of Bohemond III of Antioch.
- Bohemond IV (1189–1233, also Prince of Antioch 1201–1216 and 1219–1233)
- Bohemond V (1233–1252, also Prince of Antioch)
- Bohemond VI (1252–1275, also Prince of Antioch 1252–1268)
- Bohemond VII (1275–1287)
- Lucia (1287–1289)

Titular rulers of Tripoli after its fall to Egyptian forces:

- Lucia (1289 – c.1299)
- Philippe (c.1299 – 1300)

Tripoli passes to the Kings of Cyprus and Jerusalem:

- Peter I of Cyprus (1346–1359)
- Peter II of Cyprus (1359–1369)
- James of Lusignan (? – c. 1396), cousin
- John of Lusignan (c. 1396 – c. 1430), son
- Peter of Lusignan (c. 1430 – 1451), brother, Regent of Cyprus
- Juan Tafures (1469–1473)

== See also ==
- History of the County of Tripoli
