= Bohemond VI of Antioch =

Prince of Antioch from 1251 to 1275

Bohemond VI

Prince of Antioch
- Reign: 1251–1268/1275
- Predecessor: Bohemond V
- Successor: Conquered by Baybars

Count of Tripoli
- Reign: 1251–1275
- Predecessor: Bohemond V
- Successor: Bohemond VII
- Born: c.1237
- Died: 1275 (aged 38)
- Spouse: Sibylla of Armenia
- Issue: Bohemond, Count of Tripoli; Lucia, Countess of Tripoli
- House: House of Poitiers
- Father: Bohemond V of Antioch
- Mother: Lucienne of Segni

Bohemond VI (c. 1237–1275), also known as the Fair, was the prince of Antioch and count of Tripoli from 1251 until his death. He ruled while Antioch was caught between the warring Mongol Empire and Mamluk Sultanate. He allied with the Mongols against the Muslim Mamluks and his Crusaders fought alongside the Mongols in their battles against the Mamluks. The Mamluks would achieve a historic victory against the Mongols and halt their advance westwards at the Battle of Ain Jalut. In 1268 Antioch was captured by the Mamluks under Baybars, and he was thenceforth a prince in exile. He was succeeded by his son, Bohemond VII.

== Life ==
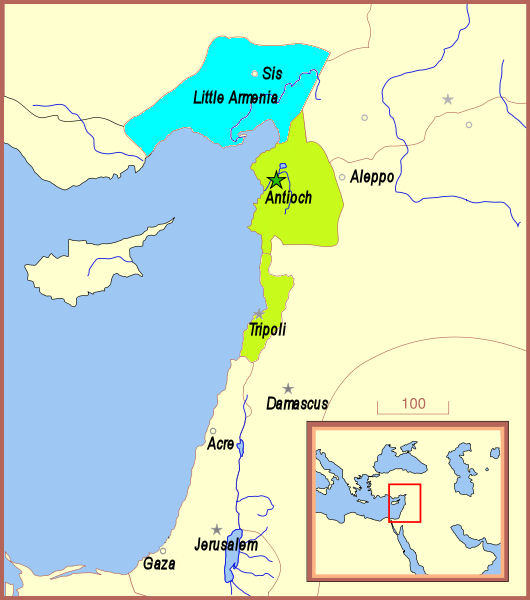
Bohemond VI ruled over Antioch and Tripoli (green), and was an ally of Cilician Armenia (blue).

Bohemond VI was the son of Bohemond V of Antioch and Lucienne of Segni, great-niece of Pope Innocent III. When Bohemond V died in January 1252, 15-year-old Bohemond VI succeeded under the regency of his mother. However, Lucienne never left Tripoli, and instead handed over the government of the principality to her relatives. This made her unpopular, so the young Bohemond VI, through the approval of King Louis IX of France, who was on Crusade at the time, gained permission from Pope Innocent IV to inherit the principality a few months early. Young Bohemond then travelled to Acre where he was knighted by King Louis, and took power in Antioch. Through the efforts of King Louis, a truce was also negotiated between Antioch and Cilician Armenia. At Louis's suggestion, in 1254 the 17-year-old Bohemond married Sibylla, daughter of King Hetoum I of Armenia, which ended the power struggle between the two states that had been started by Bohemond IV, his grandfather.

=== War of Saint Sabas ===
Bohemond was also overlord of the Genoese Embriaco family. This involved him in a dispute between the Genoese and the Venetians, the War of St. Sabas, which started in 1256 and drew in many of the nobles in the Holy Land, wasted valuable resources and cost tens of thousands of lives. The Embriaco lords of Gibelet (modern Byblos) were resolute opponents of the princes of Antioch. Bohemond tried to persuade the Genoese to support the Venetians, but the Embriaco family rebelled against him in 1258 and escalated the situation to a civil war which lasted off and on for decades. Bohemond was able to achieve some measure of peace by having the leader of the revolt, Bertrand Embriaco (a cousin of Guy I Embriaco), murdered by some serfs, but the bitterness continued.

Bertrand's son Bartholomew Embriaco became mayor of a Commune set up by the Embriaco family. Bartholomew's brother William, along with his cousin the lord of Gibelet, were eventually defeated by Bohemond's son, Bohemond VII, and then completely driven out by the Muslims.

=== Mongols ===
Bohemond's reign also saw a major conflict between the Mamluks and the Mongols. The Mongol army had been approaching steadily from central Asia, with Cilician Armenia and Antioch directly in its path. The Mongols had a deserved reputation of ruthlessness – if settlements in their path did not surrender immediately, the inhabitants were slaughtered by the tens of thousands. The Christian country of Georgia had been conquered in 1236. Hetoum I of Armenia, Bohemond's father-in-law, prudently decided to submit to Mongol authority as well, (Note: "The Armenian king saw alliance with the Mongols – or, more accurately, swift and peaceful subjection to them – as the best course of action.") sending his brother Sempad to the Mongol court in Karakorum in 1247 to negotiate the details. (Note: "The King of Armenia decided to engage into the Mongol alliance, an intelligence that the Latin barons lacked, except for Antioch.") (Note: "King Het'um of Lesser Armenia, who had reflected profoundly upon the deliverance afforded by the Mongols from his neighbbours and enemies in Rum, sent his brother, the Constable Smbat (Sempad) to Guyug's court to offer his submission.") Hethoum later persuaded his son-in-law Bohemond VI to do the same, (Note: "Under the influence of his father-in-law, the king of Armenia, the prince of Antioch had opted for submission to Hulegu") and Antioch became a tributary of the Mongols in 1260. Both Hetoum and Bohemond then participated with their own forces during the 1260 Mongol conquests of Aleppo and Damascus. Historical accounts, quoting from the writings of the medieval historian Templar of Tyre, would often dramatically describe the three Christian rulers (Hetoum, Bohemond, and Kitbuqa) entering the city of Damascus together in triumph, (Note: "On 1 March Kitbuqa entered Damascus at the head of a Mongol army. With him were the King of Armenia and the Prince of Antioch. The citizens of the ancient capital of the Caliphate saw for the first time for six centuries three Christian potentates ride in triumph through their streets") though modern historians have questioned this story as apocryphal.

The Mongols rewarded Bohemond for his allegiance, and returned to him various areas that had been lost to the Muslims, such as Lattakieh, Darkush, Kafr Debbin, and Jabala. (Note: "Bohemond VI of Tripoli and Antioch, along with neighbor and father-in-law, the Armenian King Hethoum of Cilicia, had become vassals of Hulegu. Both had received extra territory in return for their submission.") Bohemond was then able to re-occupy them, with the assistance of some Templars and Hospitallers. (Note: "[In 1260] the Franks were divided how to respond. Bohemond VI of Antioch-Tripoli, briefly one of Outremer's most important power brokers, had already accepted Mongol overlordship, with a Mongol resident and battalion stationed in Antioch itself, where they stayed until the fall of the city to the Mamluks in 1268. The Frankish Antiochenes assisted in the Mongols' capture of Aleppo, thus in part achieving a very traditional Frankish target, and had received lands in reward. By contrast, the Franks of Acre saw no advantage in submission to the Mongols.")

In return for the lands, Bohemond had to install the Greek patriarch Euthymius at Antioch, in place of the Latin patriarch, since the Mongols were trying to strengthen ties with the Byzantine Empire. This earned Bohemond the enmity of the Latins at Acre, and Bohemond was excommunicated by the Patriarch of Jerusalem, Jacques Pantaléon. (Note: "To the Latins at Acre Bohemond's subservience seemed disgraceful, especially as it involved the humiliation of the Latin Church at Antioch...Bohemond was excommunicated by the Pope for this alliance.") Pope Alexander IV put Bohemond's case on the agenda of his upcoming council (as well as the cases of Hetoum I of Armenia, and Daniel of Russia), but died in 1261, just months before the council could be convened. For a new Pope, the choice fell to Pantaléon, who took the name Pope Urban IV, and after hearing Bohemond's explanation for his submission to the Mongols, suspended his excommunication sentence.

Bohemond VI joined the Armenians and the Mongols in the capture of Damascus in 1260.

After taking Damascus, the Mongol Army had to cease their westward push, due to internal troubles in the Mongol Empire. The bulk of the Mongol army left Syria, with a smaller force left under Kitbuqa to occupy the territory. This provided an opportunity for the Egyptian Mamluks. The Mamluks advanced northward from Cairo to engage the Mongols, along the way negotiating an unusual pact of neutrality with the Franks of Acre that allowed the Egyptians to pass through Frankish territory unmolested. The Mamluks were thereby able to defeat the Mongols at the historic Battle of Ain Jalut in September 1260. With the Mongol army removed, the Mamluks then proceeded to conquer Syria and Iran, which had been previously ravaged by the Mongols. The Mamluks, under their leader Baibars, also began to threaten Antioch.

In 1263, Bohemond and Hethoum tried various methods of regaining control of the situation. They kidnapped the Greek patriarch Euthymius, and carried him off to Armenia, replacing him with the Latin patriarch Opizzo. They also attempted to gain some financial leverage over the Mamluks. For example, Bohemond and Hethoum controlled the forests of southern Anatolia and Lebanon, the wood of which was needed by the Egyptian Mamluks to build ships. Hethoum attempted to use this as a bargaining chip to obtain a truce with the Mamluks. However, the attempts at blockade merely further incited Baibars.

In 1264, Bohemond also sought assistance from the Mongols. He traveled to the court of Hulagu, trying to obtain as much support as possible from the Mongol rulers against the Mamluk progression. However, Hulagu was unhappy with Bohemond for replacing the Greek patriarch with a Latin one, as the Byzantine alliance was important to him, against the Turks in Anatolia.

Coat-of-Arms of Poitiers of Antioch

=== Loss of Antioch ===
In 1266, Hetoum too set out for the Mongol court, pleading for assistance. But while he was gone, the Mamluk army attacked the Armenian army, which was being commanded by Hetoum's sons, at the Battle of Mari. The Mamluks were victorious. They killed one of Hetoum's sons, took the other prisoner, and laid waste to Cilician Armenia, reducing the capital to ruins. After destroying Cilicia, the Mamluk army then turned its attention towards Antioch. But the generals had taken their fill of loot from Armenia, and were not eager for another battle. Bohemond was thereby able to bribe them to keep them from attacking.

Baibars was angry at his generals' weakness, and returned to the attack. In May 1267 he attacked Acre, and in 1268 he began the Siege of Antioch, taking the city while Bohemond was away in Tripoli. All of northern Syria was quickly lost, leaving Bohemond with no estates except Tripoli.

=== Siege of Tripoli ===
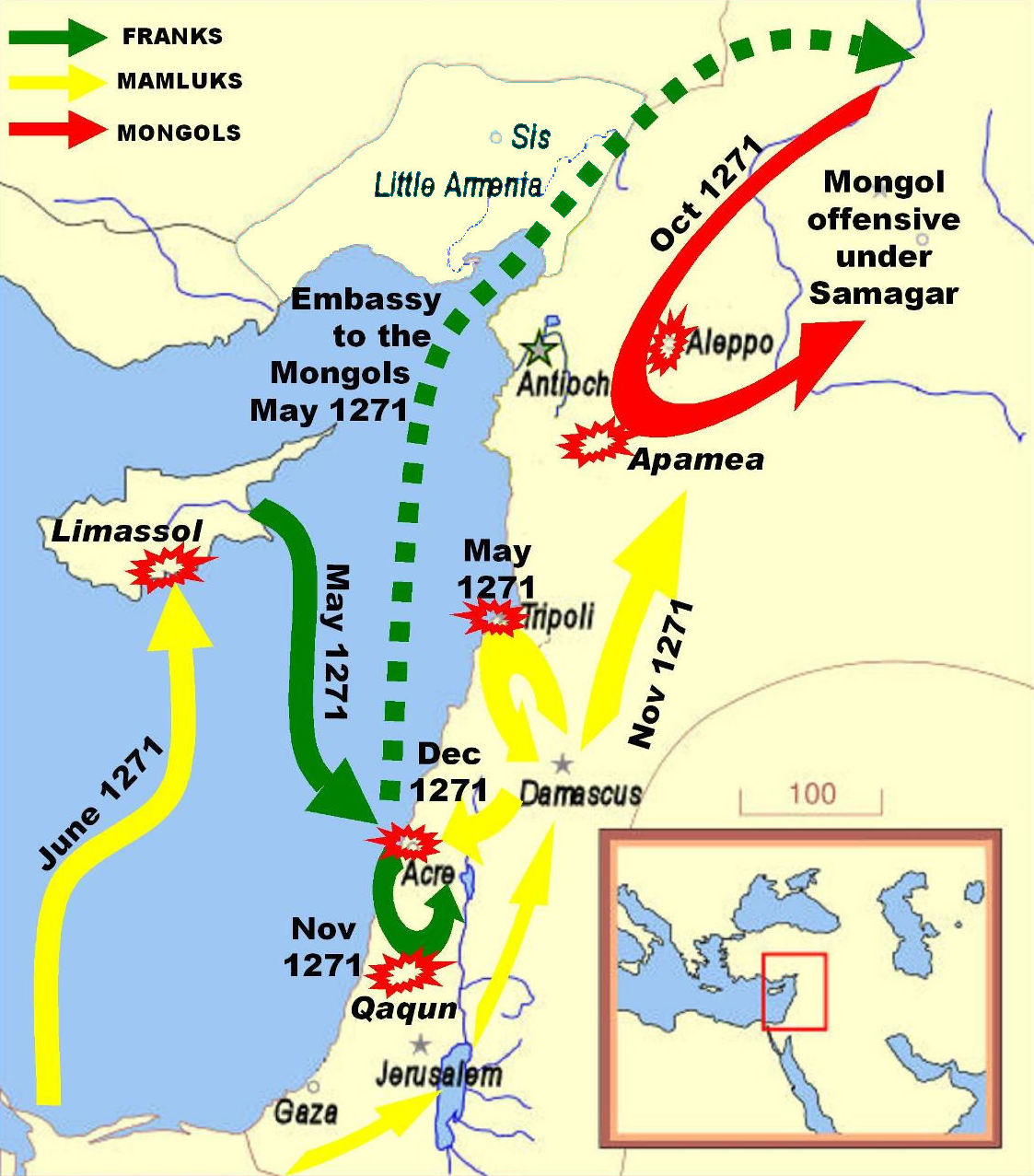
Baibars's siege of Bohemond VI in Tripoli was lifted in May 1271 when Edward I arrived in the Levant, starting the Ninth Crusade.

Baibars attacked again in 1271 by starting the Siege of Tripoli, sending a letter to Bohemond threatening him with total annihilation and taunting him for his alliance with the Mongols:

"Our yellow flags have repelled your red flags, and the sound of the bells has been replaced by the call: "Allâh Akbar!" (...) Warn your walls and your churches that soon our siege machinery will deal with them, your knights that soon our swords will invite themselves in their homes (...) We will see then what use will be your alliance with Abagha"

— Letter from Baibars to Bohemond VI, 1271

Bohemond begged for a truce, so as not to lose Tripoli as well. Baibars mocked him for lack of courage and asked him to pay all the expenses of the Mamluk campaign. Bohemond had enough pride left to refuse the offer, but in May Baibars offered him a truce anyway. By this time, the Mamluks had captured every inland castle of the Franks, but the Mamluks had heard reports about a new Crusade, this one from the prince who would later be Edward I of England. Edward had landed in Acre on May 9, 1271, where he was soon joined by Bohemond and his cousin King Hugh III of Cyprus.

Bohemond died in 1275, leaving a son and three daughters: Bohemond VII, nominal prince of Antioch (though Antioch had ceased to exist) and count of Tripoli; Isabelle, who died young; Lucia, later titular countess of Tripoli; and Marie (d. ca 1280), married to Nicolas de Saint-Omer (d. 1294).

The rancour of the Mamluks regarding Bohemond VI's alliance with the Mongols would remain until 1289 with the final Fall of Tripoli.

== Notes ==
Preceded by Bohemund V	Prince of Antioch; 1252–1268	conquered by Baibars
Preceded by Bohemund V	Count of Tripoli; 1252–1275	Succeeded by Bohemond VII
