= Latin Diocese of Tripoli =

The Latin Diocese of Tripoli was established in 1104 in the aftermath of the First Crusade. It remained a residential bishopric until 1289, after which it became a titular bishopric, which it remains today in the Catholic Church.

Tripoli had been the seat of a Greek Orthodox diocese until at least the 10th century, but if there was an Orthodox bishop in 1104 he was pushed aside. The Orthodox dioceses of Arqa and Orthosias, also mentioned in the 10th century, seem to have been incorporated into the Latin diocese of Tripoli.

The first Latin bishop was appointed by Count Raymond IV of Toulouse during the siege of Tripoli. The bishops of Tripoli were traditionally suffragans of the archbishop of Tyre, but because Tyre lay in Muslim lands authority over Tripoli was asserted by the patriarch of Antioch, Bernard of Valence. It was the first and for some years the only diocese in the County of Tripoli. Despite its great geographic extent, it was not subdivided into archdeaconries on account of the small number of Latin Christians in its jurisdiction. The majority of Christians in the bishopric were Maronites not in communion with the Latins or Greeks. By the late 13th century, there was also a Nestorian community in the city itself.

In 1113, Pope Paschal II confirmed Bernard's jurisdiction over Tripoli. In 1127, after the conquest of Tyre in 1124, Pope Honorius II ordered Tripoli to give obedience to the archbishop of Tyre (who was subject to the patriarch of Jerusalem). In response, Bernard of Valence divided the jurisdiction of Tripoli by appointing bishops for Tortosa and Gibelet. All of these dioceses refused to submit to Tyre and remained de facto suffragans of Antioch through the patriarchate of Aimery of Limoges, although Innocent II ordered them again to submit to Tyre in 1138.

Following the conquests of Saladin (1182–1192), Tripoli was cut off from overland contact with Antioch and relations between bishop and patriarch had to be conducted by sea. By 1237, Tripoli was one of the wealthiest sees remaining to Antioch. This it remained until 1289. As such, it was the most popular target of papal provisions. Between 1198 and 1289, eight clerics were "provided" to the church and received prebends.

Unlike many bishops in Western Europe, the bishop of Tripoli held no temporal lordship, only spiritual jurisdiction. The cathedral chapter consisted of a community of Augustinian canons. It was one of only five cathedrals in the Crusader states whose canons were not secular, the other being Jerusalem, Bethlehem, Nazareth and Hebron. There was a community of Cistercian nuns at Tripoli.

== List of bishops ==
- Albert (Hubert) of Saint Erard, fl. 1104–1115
- Pons, fl. 1115
- Bernard, fl. 1117–1127
- William, fl. 1132
- Gerard, c. 1137–1145
- William, fl. 1149–1152
- Gombald, 1170, bishop-elect
- Roman, fl. 1174–1179
- John, 1183–1184
- Aimery, 1186–1190
- Peter of Angoulême, c. 1191–1196, translated to Antioch
- Lawrence, fl. 1198–1199
- Geoffrey, fl. 1204–1217
- Robert, fl. 1217–1228
- Guy of Valence, fl. c. 1228–1237
- Albert, 1243, bishop-elect
- Gregory of Montelongo, 1249–1251, bishop-elect
- Opizo, c. 1252–1259
- Paul of Segni, 1261–1285
- Cinthius (Cynthis) de Pinea, 1285–1286, bishop-elect
- Bernard of Montmajour, fl. 1286–1296

== Bibliography ==
- Cahen, Claude (1940). La Syrie du nord à l'époque des croisades et la principauté franque d'Antioche. Études arabes, médiévales et modernes. P. Geuthner. ISBN 9782351594186.
- Hamilton, Bernard (1980). The Latin Church in the Crusader States: The Secular Church. Ashgate.
- Williams, Steven J. (2003). The Secret of Secrets: The Scholarly Career of a Pseudo-Aristotelian Text in the Latin Middle Ages. University of Michigan Press.
