= Mongol Armenia =

Mongol occupation of Armenia

- 1236–1335
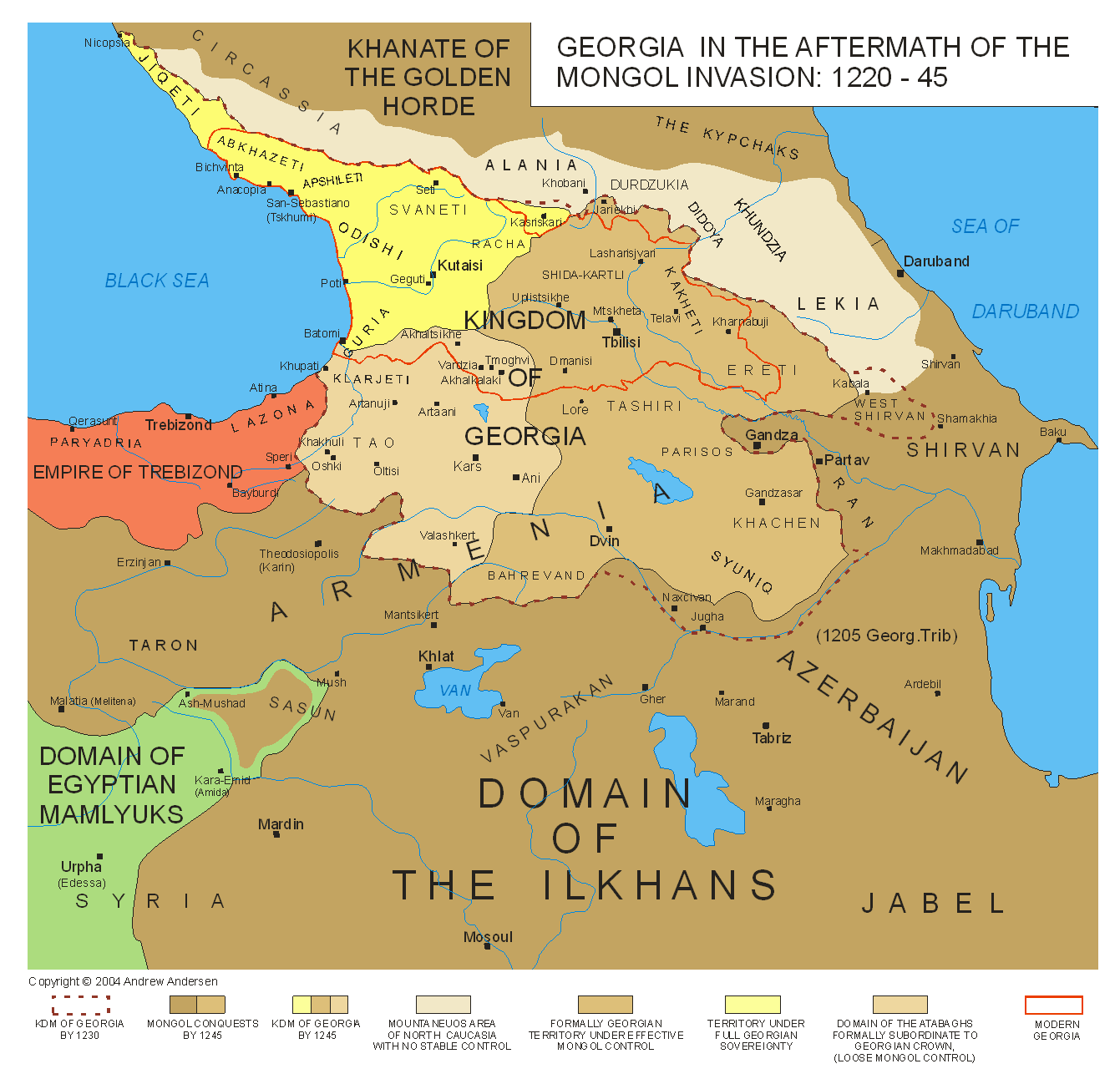
- Georgia (and Armenia) in the aftermath of the Mongol invasion (1220–1245)
- Status: Mongol (Ilkhanate) vassal state by the reign of Hulegu Khan
- Capital: Ani
- Common languages: Armenian (native language); Oghuz Turkic; Mongolian
- Religion: Armenian Apostolic; Sunni Islam; Buddhism
- Government: Monarchy
- Historical era: Medieval Armenia
  - Established: 1236
  - Disestablished: 1335
Preceded by
Zakarid Armenia
Kingdom of Georgia
Succeeded by
Kara Koyunlu
Kingdom of Georgia
Principality of Khachen

Mongol Armenia or Ilkhanid Armenia refers to the period beginning in the early-to-mid 13th century during which both Zakarid Armenia and the Armenian Kingdom of Cilicia became tributary and vassal to the Mongol Empire and the successor Ilkhanate. Armenia and Cilicia remained under Mongol influence until around 1335.

During the time period of the later Crusades (1250s to 1260s), there was a short-lived Armenian-Mongol alliance, engaged in some combined military operations against their common enemy, the Mamluks. They succeeded in the Siege of Baghdad, but suffered defeat eight years later.

The Armenian calls for a wider Christian-Mongol alliance against Mamluk Islam, advocated notably by Hayton of Corycus, were ignored by the Latin powers in the Levant, leading to the demise of the European Crusader States and the imminent failure of the Crusades as a whole.

== Background ==
=== Armenian background ===
The Armenian Kingdom of Cilicia, or "Lesser Armenia" was formed in the late 11th century, by refugees and migrants from "Greater Armenia". The area was staunchly Christian, as Armenia itself had been the first nation to ever adopt Christianity as its official religion, in the 4th century. Armenians were therefore very friendly to the European Crusaders who began to arrive in the early 12th century. As the Crusades progressed, the Armenian leaders were regular players in the politics of the region, aligning with the Crusader states against the Muslims.

=== Mongol background ===
Genghis Khan had died in 1227, and by 1241, the Empire was split up into four smaller independent khanates, which continued to further expand the Empire. The southwestern khanate, known as the Ilkhanate, under the leadership of Genghis Khan's grandson Hulagu, advanced towards Persia and the Holy Land. City after city fell to the Mongols, including some Christian realms in their path. Christian Georgia was repeatedly attacked starting in 1220, and in 1243 Queen Rusudan formally submitted to the Mongols, turning Georgia into a vassal state which then became a regular ally in the Mongol military conquests. This was a common practice in use by the growing Mongol empire – as they conquered new territories, they would absorb the populace and warriors into their own Mongol army, which they would then use to further expand the Empire.

== Armenian vassalage to the Mongols ==
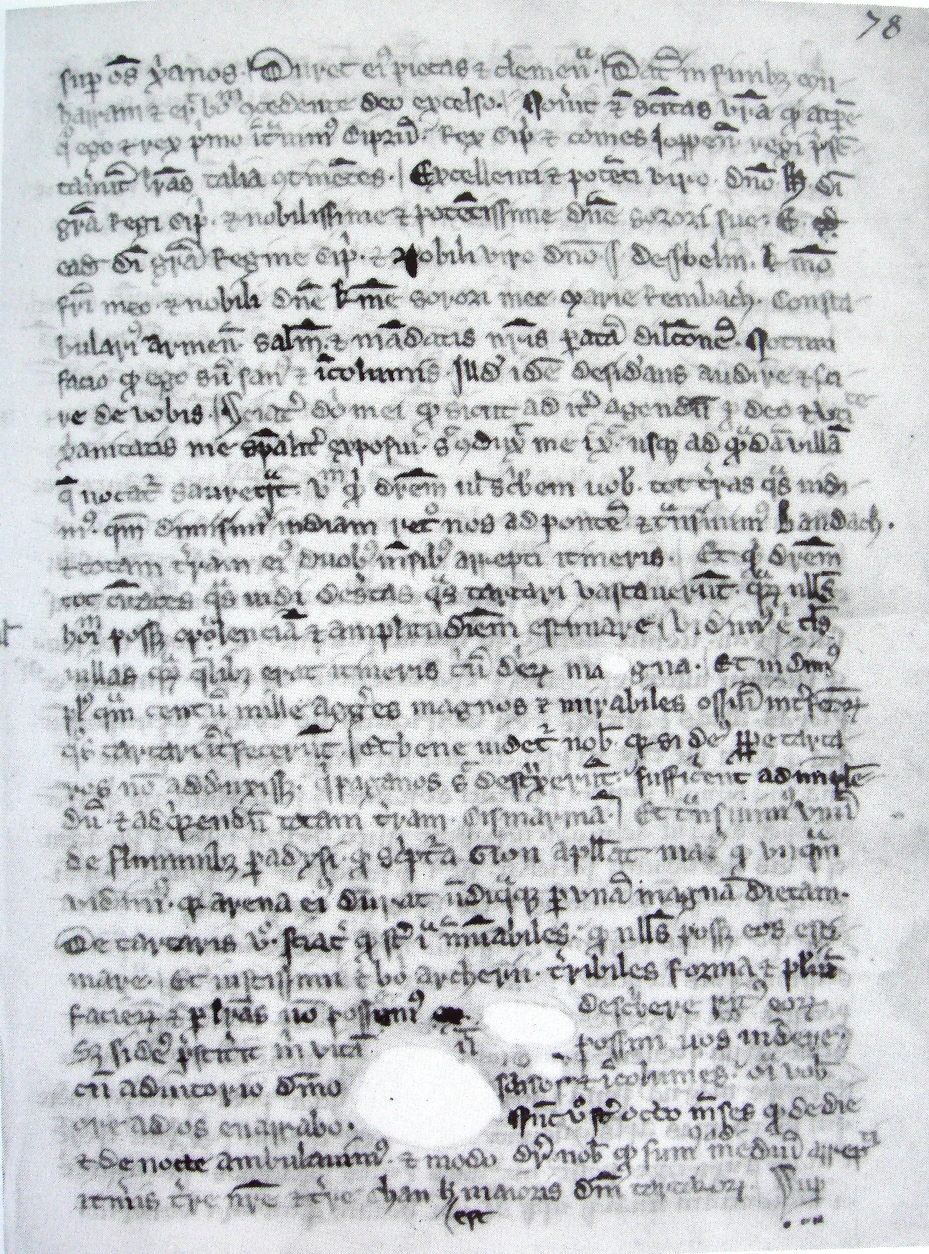
14th century copy of the February 7, 1248, letter of Sempad to Henry I of Cyprus and John of Ibelin, stating that "If God hadn't brought the Tartars who then massacred the pagans, they [the Sarasins] would have been able to invade the whole land as far as the sea." The letter was also shown to Louis IX.

When the Mongols reached the Caucasus, they conquered Greater Armenia/Bagratid Armenia and various Armenian barons opted to swear loyalty to the Mongol Empire. In 1236, the Grand Prince of Karabagh, Hasan Jalal submitted to the Mongols, and in return received back some of the territories which had previously been conquered. He also traveled twice to the Mongol capital of Karakorum, where he negotiated further details of the relationship with the khan.

In the 1240s, as the Mongols continued their advance towards Cilicia, King Hethum I chose to follow the example of the Greater Armenian barons such as Hasan Jalal, and also submitted to the Ilkhanate.

To formalize his own relationship with the Mongols, in 1247 Hethum I sent his elder half-brother Sempad the Constable to the Mongol court in Karakorum. Sempad met with Güyük Khan and his successor, Kublai Khan's brother Möngke Khan, and made an agreement of cooperation, against their common enemy the Muslims. The nature of this relationship is disputed by historians, some of whom call it an alliance, and others who say that the Armenians had submitted to Mongol overlordship, and become a vassal state similar to any other conquered region.

Sempad was enthusiastic about his travel to the Mongol realm, which lasted until 1250. He discovered many Christians in Mongol lands, even among the Mongols themselves. On February 7, 1248, he sent a letter from Samarkand to his brother-in-law Henry I, king of Cyprus (who was married to the Armenian princess Stephanie, Sempad and Hethum I's sister). In his letter, Sempad described a Central Asian realm of oasis with many Christians, generally of the Nestorian rite:

We have found many Christians throughout the land of the Orient, and many churches, large and beautiful... The Christians of the Orient went to the Khan of the Tartars who now rules (Güyük), and he received them with great honour and gave them freedom and let it know everywhere that no-one should dare antagonize them, be it in deeds or in words."

— Letter from Sempad to Henry I.

During his visit to the Mongol court, Sempad received a relative of the Great Khan as a bride. He had a child with her, named Vasil Tatar, who would later be captured by the Mamluks at the Battle of Mari in 1266.

In 1254, King Hethum himself traveled through Central Asia to the Mongol court, to renew the agreement. He brought many sumptuous presents, and met with Möngke Khan (Güyük's cousin) at Karakorum. Hethum, who came spontaneously as a vassal, was very well received by the Mongols. He had an audience with Möngke on September 13, 1254, advised the Khan on Christian matters in Western Asia, and obtained from the Khan documents guaranteeing the inviolability of his person and his kingdom. Möngke also informed him that he was preparing to mount an attack on Baghdad and that he would remit Jerusalem to the Christians if they collaborated with him. The Armenians also had very friendly relations with the Crusader states, especially from 1254 when Hethum's daughter Princess Sibylla of Armenia married Bohemond VI, ruler of the Principality of Antioch and County of Tripoli, upon the recommendation of King Louis IX of France. Hethum strongly encouraged other Frankish rulers to follow his example and submit to Mongol overlordship, but persuaded only his son-in-law Bohemond, who offered his own submission sometime in the 1250s.

1260 Mongol offensive in the Levant

Military collaboration between the Armenians and the Mongols began in 1258–1260, when Hethum I, Bohemond VI, and the Georgians combined forces with the Mongols under Hulagu in the Mongol invasion of Syria and Mesopotamia. In 1258, the combined forces conquered the center of the most powerful Islamic dynasty in existence at that time, that of the Abbasids in the siege of Baghdad. From there, the Mongol forces and their Christian allies conquered Muslim Syria, domain of the Ayyubid Dynasty. They took the city of Aleppo with the help of the Franks of Antioch, and on March 1, 1260, under the Christian general Kitbuqa, they also took Damascus. Historical accounts, quoting from the writings of the medieval historian Templar of Tyre, used to describe the three Christian rulers (Hetoum, Bohemond, and Kitbuqa) entering the city of Damascus together in triumph, though modern historians have questioned this story as apocryphal.

== Mamluk opposition ==
The Mongol expansion into the Middle East was stopped in 1260, when the Franks in Acre struck a passive alliance with the Egyptian Mamluks, allowing the Muslim Mamluks to achieve a decisive victory against the Mongols at the pivotal Battle of Ain Jalut, a battle in which 500 knights from Armenia may have participated, fighting on the side of the Mongols.

Following Ain Jalut, the remainder of the Mongol army retreated to Cilician Armenia under the commander Ilka, to be re-equipped by Hethum I. Hulagu then attempted a counter-attack which briefly occupied Aleppo, but it was repelled by the princes of Hama and Homs, subjects to the Sultan.

In 1262, the Mamluk leader Baibars began to threaten Antioch, which (as a vassal of the Armenian king) had earlier supported the Mongols. That summer, Hethum again went to the Mongols to obtain their intervention to deliver the city from the Muslim threat. However, Hulagu was only able to send troops to attack the frontier fort of Al-Bira (1264–1265).

Following the death of the Mongol leader Hulagu in 1265, Baibars again threatened Cilician Armenia from Egypt. In 1266, Baibars summoned Hethum I to abandon his allegiance to the Mongols, to accept Mamluk suzerainty, and remit to the Mamluks the territories and fortresses Hethum had acquired through his submission to the Mongols. Following these threats, Hethum I again went to the Mongol court of the Il-Khan to obtain military support. During his absence however, the Mamluks marched on Armenia, led by Ali ibn Aybak and Qalawun, and defeated the Armenians at the Battle of Mari, causing great devastation to the country.

In 1269, Hethum I abdicated in favour of his son Leo II, who was forced to pay large annual tributes to the Mamluks. Even with the tributes though, the Mamluks continued to attack Cilicia every few years.

== Joint invasion of Syria (1280–1281) ==
Following the death of Baibars in 1277, and the ensuing disorganisation of the Muslim realm, the Mongols seized the opportunity and organized a new invasion of Syrian land. In September 1280, the Mongols occupied Baghras and Darbsak, and took Aleppo on October 20. Abagha and Leo III of Armenia urged the Franks to start a new Crusade, but only the Hospitallers and Edward I of England (who could not come for lack of funds) responded favourably. The Hospitallers of Marqab made combined raids into the Buqaia, and won several engagements against the Sultan, raiding as far as the Krak des Chevaliers in October 1280, and defeating the Mamluk army of the Krak in February 1281. However, the Mongols finally retreated, pledging to come back for the winter of 1281.

=== Campaign of Autumn 1281 ===
On October 30, 1281, 50,000 Mongol troops, together with 30,000 Armenians, Georgians, Greeks, and about 200 Hospitaller Knights of Marqab "fought against the Muslim leader Qalawun at the Second Battle of Homs, but they were repelled, with heavy losses on both sides.

== Continued Armeno-Mongol relations ==
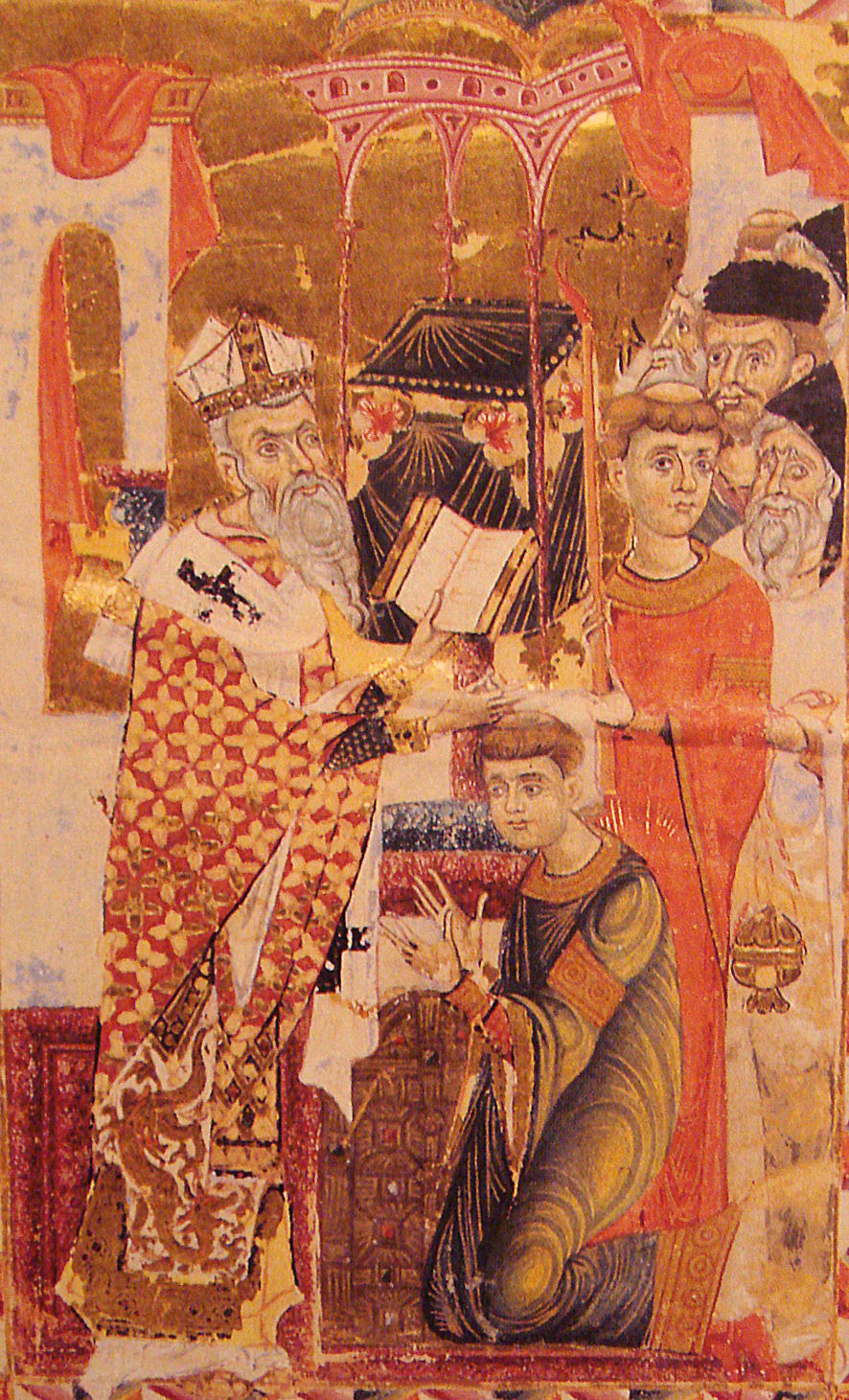
Archbishop John of Cilician Armenia, in a painting from 1287. His dress displays a Chinese dragon, an indication of the thriving exchanges with the Mongols during the period.

In 1284, the Dominican Burchard of Mount Sion visited Cilician Armenia and left an account of his travel there. He stayed at the royal court of Sis, and at the catholicossal seat of Hromgla. Burchard described the country as submitted to Mongol domination, and explained that Mongols were present at the royal Armenian court:

Actually, I spent three weeks with the king of Armenia and Cilicia, who had with him some Tartars. The rest of the attendants were Christians, to the number of about 200. I saw them gather to go to church, listen to the office, bend the knee, and pray with devotion.

— Burchard of Mount Sion, 1282.

In 1292, the Mamluks sacked Hromkla, which required the Holy See to move to Sis.

In 1293, during the reign of the Ilkhan Gaykhatu, Hethum II, Hethum I's grandson, was king. Cilician Armenia was attacked by the Mamluks and since the Mongols were unable to assist, a considerable amount of territory was lost in the eastern part of the country. Hethum II then abandoned his throne to enter a Franciscan convent under the name John (an apparent homage to John of Monte Corvino), leaving official rule to his brother Thoros for two years, before Hethum regained the throne.

With the rise of the Mongol Ilkhan Ghazan in 1295, Hethum II was able to again reinforce relations with the Mongols. Hethum visited Ghazan at his court, who renewed the relationship, and would remain faithful to it by continuously fighting the Mamluks. Ghazan had been baptized and raised as a Christian, though he had become a Muslim upon accession to the throne. He retained however a strong enmity towards the Egyptian Mamluks, and along with his Armeno-Mongol relations, he also attempted to coordinate actions with the Franks of Cyprus.

In 1296, Hethum II visited Constantinople to reinforce contacts there as well, giving his sister Rita in marriage to Emperor Michael VIII Palaiologos. During his absence, Smpad of Armenia captured the throne and also attempted to obtain Mongol support, and married a relative of Ghazan. In 1298, Hethum II would again regain the throne, and continued relations with the Mongols.

== Attempt to recapture the Levant (1297–1303) ==
In 1297, Ghazan resumed offensives against the Mamluks and tried to revive the attempts at a Franco-Mongol alliance. The plan was to combine the forces of the Christian military orders, the King of Cyprus, the aristocracy of Cyprus and Cilician Armenia, and the Mongols of the Ilkhanate. However, the Christians in the Levant had little support from Europe, and no new Crusade to help sustain their actions.

=== Campaign of winter 1299–1300 ===
Mongol offensive in the Levant, 1299–1300

In the summer of 1299, due to impending invasion from the Egyptian Mamluks, King Hethum II sent a message to Ghazan to obtain his support. In response, Ghazan marched with his forces towards Syria and sent letters to the Franks of Cyprus (the King of Cyprus, and the heads of the military orders), inviting them to come join him in his attack on the Mamluks in Syria.

The Mongols successfully took the city of Aleppo, and were there joined by King Hethum, whose forces included some Templars and Hospitallers from Armenia, who participated in the rest of the offensive. The Mongols and their allies defeated the Mamluks in the Battle of Wadi al-Khazandar, on December 23 or 24, 1299, and then proceeded on to Damascus, which surrendered somewhere between December 30, 1299, and January 6, 1300, though the Citadel of Damascus resisted. Ghazan then retreated most of his forces in February, probably because their horses needed fodder. He promised to return in the winter of 1300–1301 to attack Egypt. A relatively small force of Mongols, about 10,000 horsemen under the Mongol general Mulay, ruled over Syria, and engaged in raids as far south as Jerusalem and Gaza. But that small force had to retreat when the Mamluks returned in May 1300.

==== Defeat of Shaqhab ====
In 1303, the Mongols again appeared in great strength (about 80,000) together with the Armenians, but they were defeated at Homs on March 30, 1303, and at the decisive Battle of Shaqhab, south of Damascus, on April 21, 1303. It is considered to be the last major Mongol invasion of Syria. In 1304, the Egyptian Mamluks continued their assault on Cilician Armenia, and succeeded in taking back all the lands which the Armenians had acquired during the Mongol invasion. Until its final fall in 1375, Cilician Armenia received a succession of attacks from the Mamluks, with only few successes, such as the Battle of Ayas in 1305.

== Advocating a new Crusade with the Mongols (1307) ==
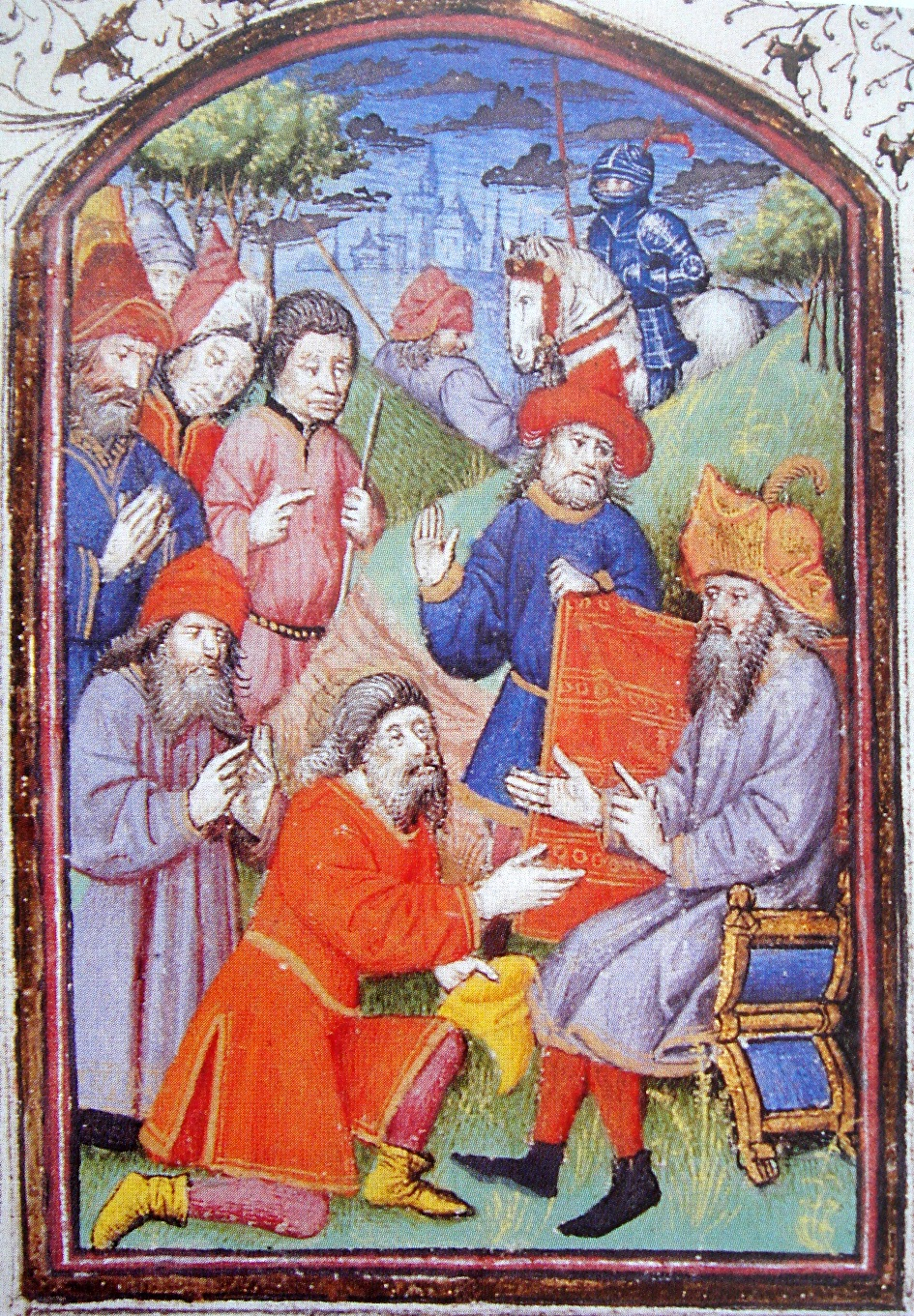
Hethum I (seated) in the Mongol court of Karakorum, "receiving the homage of the Mongols". "Histoire des Tartars", Hayton of Corycus, 1307.

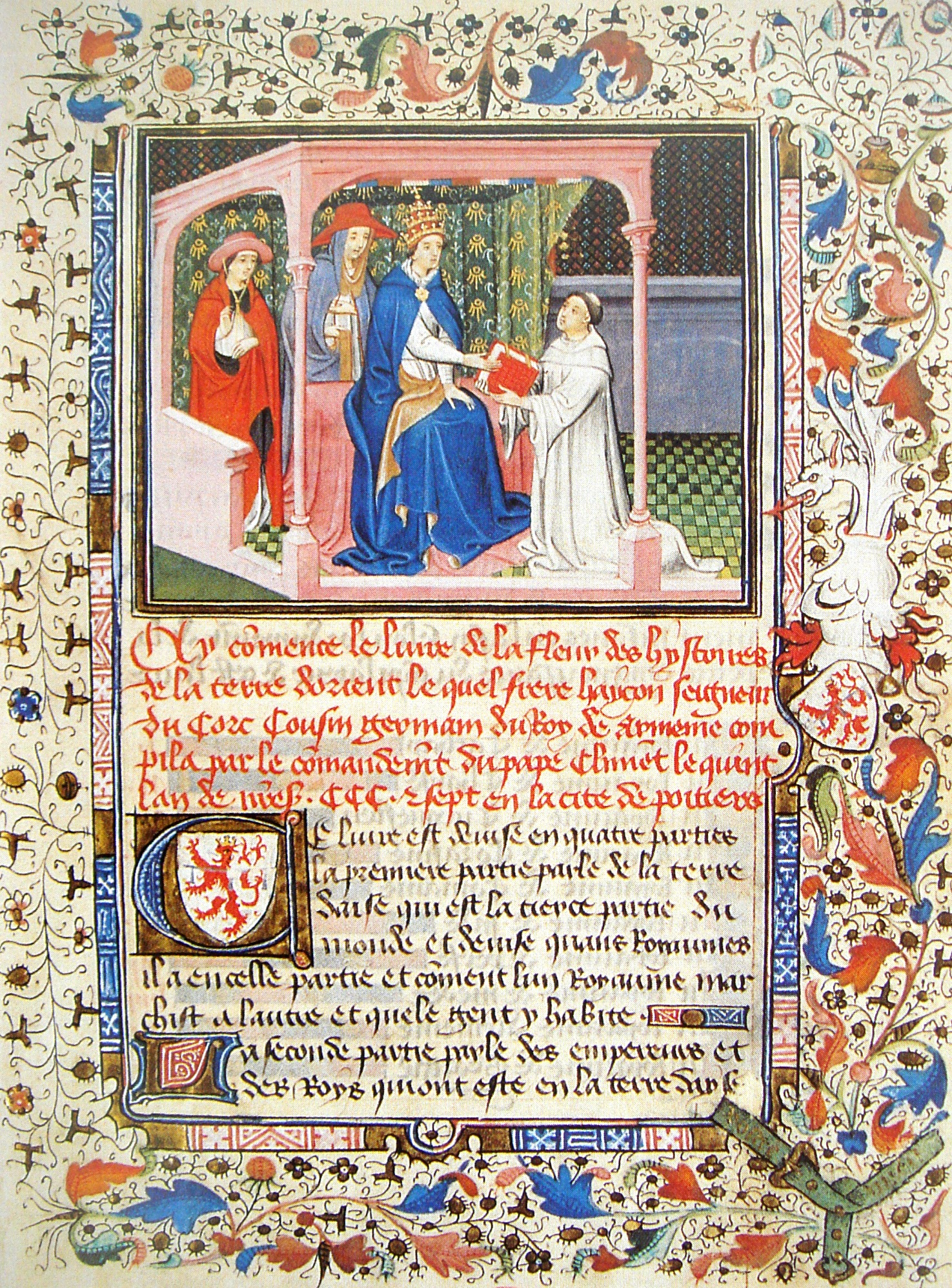
Hayton of Corycus remitting his report on the Mongols, to Pope Clement V, in 1307.

In 1307, Hethum II and Leon III were assassinated with their retinue by the Mongol general of Cilicia, Bilarghu, following an internal plot against Hethum's efforts to unite the Armenian Church with Rome. The Mongol ruler Oljeitu later executed Bilarghu for his crime.

Also in 1307, the Armenian monk Hayton of Corycus went to visit Pope Clement V in Poitiers, where he wrote his famous "Flor des Histoires d'Orient", a compilation of the events of the Holy Land describing the relations with the Mongols, and setting recommendations for a new Crusade:

God has also shown the Christians that the time is right because the Tartars themselves have offered to give help to the Christians against the Saracens. For this reason Gharbanda, King of the Tartars, sent his messengers offering to use all his power to undo the enemies of the Christian land. Thus, at present, the Holy Land might be recovered with the help of the Tartars and the realm of Egypt, easily conquered without peril or danger. And so Christian forces ought to leave for the Holy Land without any delay.

— Hayton, Flor des Estoires d'Orient, Book IV.

== Last Mongol intervention in Cilician Armenia (1322) ==
In 1320, the Egyptian sultan Naser Mohammed ibn Kelaoun invaded and ravaged Cilician Armenia. Pope John XXII sent a letter, dated July 1, 1322, from Avignon to the Mongol ruler Abu Sa'id (1305–1335), reminding him of the alliance of his ancestors with Christians and asking him to intervene. Mongol troops were sent to Cilicia, but only arrived after a truce had been negotiated for 15 years between Constantin, patriarch of the Armenians, and the sultan of Egypt.

Relations with the Mongols would essentially disappear after 1320, while relations with the Franks were reinforced, with the establishment of the French Lusignan dynasty as the ruling family in Cilician Armenia, due to the policy since 1254 of inter-marriage between the royal families of Cyprus and Cilician Armenia. Following the murder of Leo IV in 1341, his cousin Guy Lusignan was elected king. However, when the pro-Latin Lusignans took power, they tried to impose Catholicism and the European way of life. The Armenian leadership largely accepted this, but the peasantry opposed the changes. Eventually, this led the way to civil strife.

After Abu Sa'id, relations between Christian princes and the Mongols were totally abandoned. Abu Sa'id died without heir and successor, and after his death the state lost its status, becoming a plethora of little kingdoms run by Mongols, Turks, and Persians.

In the late 14th century, Cilicia was invaded by the Mamluks. The fall of Sis in April 1375 finally brought an end to the kingdom; its last King, Leo V, was granted safe passage and died in exile in Paris in 1393 after calling in vain for another Crusade. The title was claimed by his cousin, James I of Cyprus, uniting it with the titles of Cyprus and Jerusalem. Thus ended the last fully independent Armenian entity of the Middle Ages after three centuries of vassalage to Byzantines, Mongols and Franks. The relationship with the Mongols had allowed it to significantly outlive the Crusader states, and to survive for an additional century in the face of the Muslim expansion.

== See also ==
- Buddhism in Armenia
- Armenian historiography of the 5th–18th centuries
