= Keran, Queen of Armenia =

Keran of Lampron
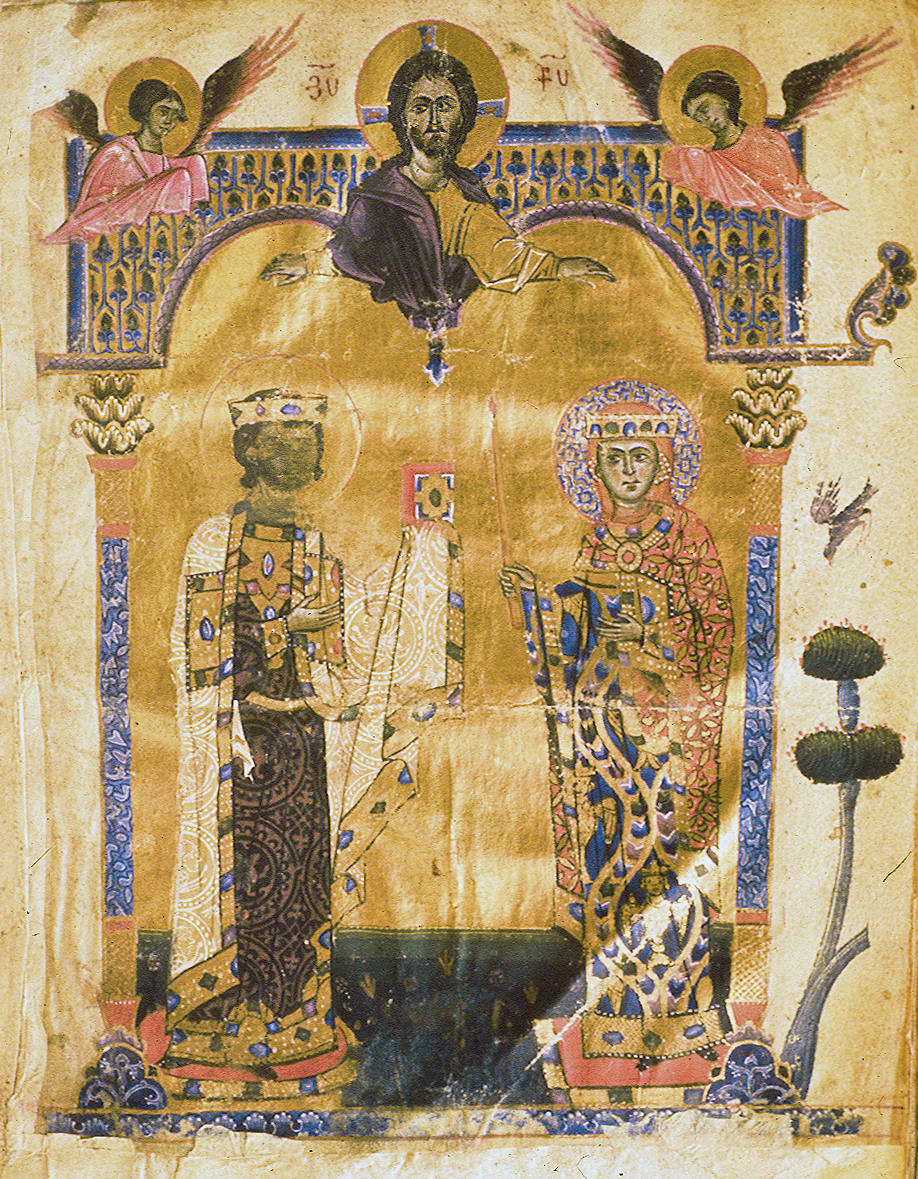
- Portrait of King Leo II and Queen Keran of Armenia by Toros Roslin, 1262

Queen consort of Armenia
- Tenure: 1269/1270 – 1285
- Died: 28 July 1285
- Spouse: Leo II, King of Armenia
- Issue …among others: Hethum II; Thoros III; Sempad; Isabella, Princess of Tyre; Constantine I Rita, Byzantine Empress; Oshin
- House: Lambron
- Father: Prince Hethum of Lampron
- Mother: Unknown

Keran of Lampron (Armenian: Կեռան; before 1262 – 28 July 1285) was by birth a member of the House of Lampron and by marriage queen consort of Armenia.

She was the daughter of Prince Hethum of Lampron by his unknown wife, who probably was from Frankish origin. She had three known siblings: Marianne, Alix (later wife of Balian d'Ibelin, Seneschal of Cyprus), and Raymond, Lord of Michael'gla.

== Life ==
Before 15 January 1262/14 January 1263, Keran married Prince Leo of Armenia, eldest son and heir of King Hethum I, who became King after his father's abdication in 1270. Born Anna, she was called Kir-Anna (Lady Anna) after her husband took the throne. This name was later shortened to Keran, or Guerane.

Their marriage served to joon

Many words of praise were made about Queen Keran by her contemporaries. Her son Hethum claimed that "she had a wonderful soul and a beautiful body." The chronicler and scribe Avetis, described her as "a good friend to her husband in trouble and joy."

Notably, Keran was recognized and admired as a patron of the arts. She both commissioned works of art, and was the receiver of works of art as gifts - one of the most famous being The Gospel Book of Lady Keran and Prince Levon, an illuminated book given to the couple upon their wedding.

After the birth of her last son, Keran became a nun and entered the Monastery of Trazarg, assuming the name of Theophania. She was probably joined there by her sister Marianne. She died on 28 July 1285 and was buried in the Monastery.

== Issue ==
Queen Keran bore her husband Levon (Leo) II, King of Armenia sixteen children:

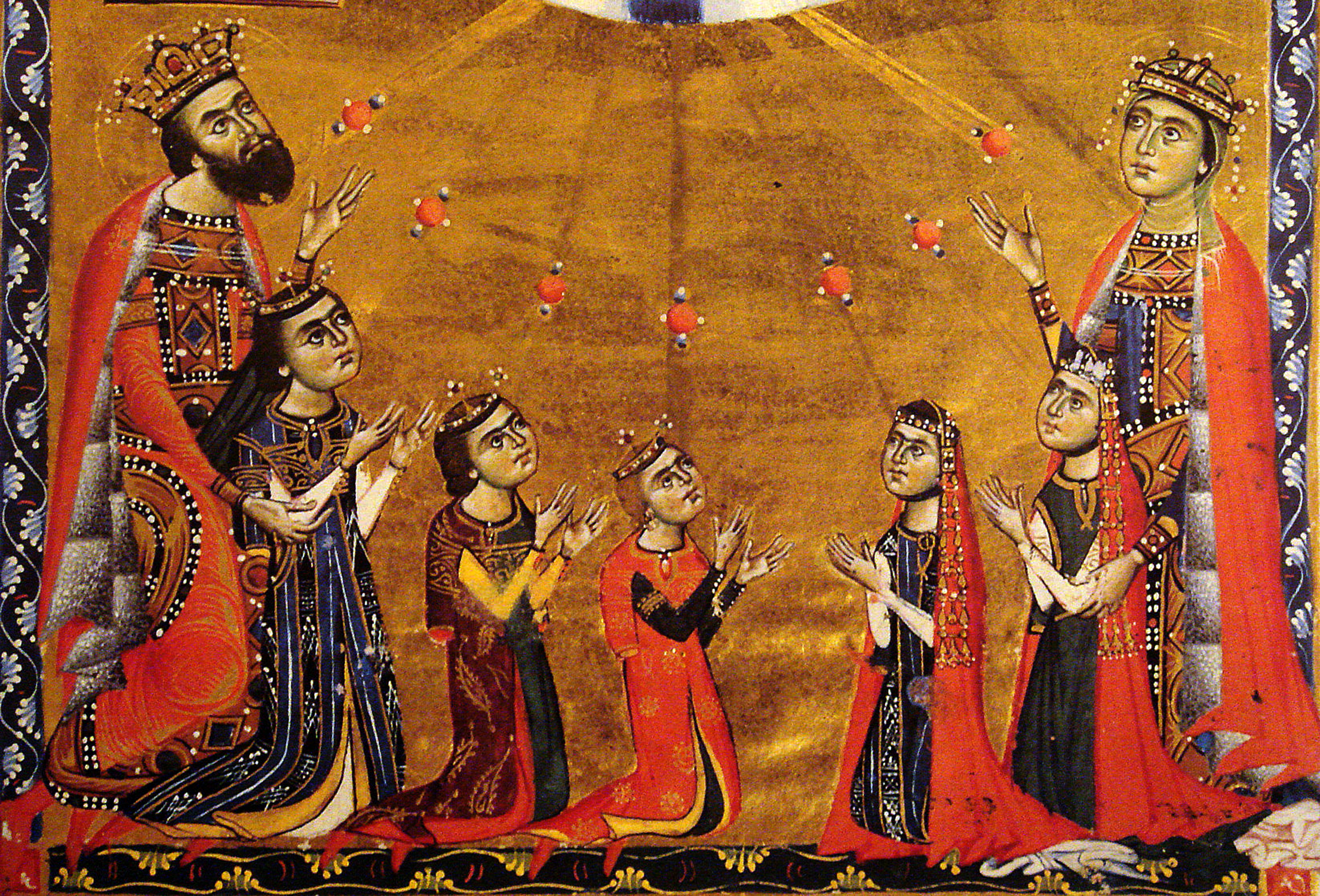
Leon II, queen Guerane, and their five children, 1272.

1. Son (b. 15 January 1262/14 January 1263 – d. young).
2. Constantine (b. June 1265 – d. young).
3. Fimi [Euphemia] (b. ca. 14 January 1266 – d. young).
4. Hethum II (b. ca. 13 January 1267 – murdered 7 November 1307), King of Armenia (ruled 1289 to 1293, 1294 to 1297, 1299 to 1307).
5. Isabella [Zabel] (b. 13 January 1269/12 January 1270 – d. bef. 1273).
6. Thoros III (b. October 1270 – murdered 23 July 1298), King of Armenia (ruled 1293 to 1298).
7. Ruben (b. 13 January 1272/12 January 1273 – d. young)
8. Isabella [Zabel] (b. 12 January 1273/11 January 1274 – d. bef. 1276).
9. Sempad (b. 12 January 1276/11 January 1277 – d. 1310 or 1311), King of Armenia (ruled 1297 to 1299).
10. Isabella [Zabel] (b. 12 January 1276/11 January 1277 – murdered May 1323), twin with Sempad; married in 1293 with Amalric of Lusignan, Lord of Tyre, son of King Hugh III of Cyprus.
11. Constantine I (b. 11 January 1277/10 January 1278 – d. aft. 1308), King of Armenia (ruled 1299).
12. Rita (b. 11 January 1278/10 January 1279 – July 1333), renamed Maria upon her wedding; married in 1294 with Michael IX Palaeologus, co-Emperor of the Byzantine Empire with his father Andronicus II Palaeologus.
13. Theophanu (b. 11 January 1278/10 January 1279 – d. 1296), twin with Rita; renamed Teodora upon her betrothal; she died en route to be married with Theodore, son of John I Doukas, Lord of Thessaly.
14. Nerses (b. 11 January 1279/10 Jan 1280 – d. 26 May 1301), a priest.
15. Oshin (b. 10 January 1283/9 January 1284 – murdered 20 July 1320), King of Armenia (ruled 1308 to 1320).
16. Alinakh (b. 10 January 1283/9 January 1284 – d. 28 August 1310), twin with Oshin; Lord of Lampron and Tarsus.

== Bibliography ==
- Khachatrian, Hayk (2001). Queens of the Armenians: 150 Biographies Based on History and Legend. Yerevan: Amaras. ISBN 0-9648787-2-0.
- Rapti, Ioanna (2022). "Beyond the Page: Royal Imagery in the Queen Keṙan Gospels and the Rhetoric of the Court in Armenian Cilicia". In Bacci, Michele; Studer-Karlen, Manuela (eds.). Meanings and Functions of the Ruler’s Image in the Mediterranean World (11th–15th Centuries). Brill. pp. 58–94.

Keran, Queen of Armenia Hethumids Born: circa. ? Died: 28 July 1285
Royal titles
New creation	Queen consort of Armenia; 1269–1285	Vacant Title next held by Margaret of Lusignan
