= Margaret of Lusignan =

- Spouse: Thoros III
- Issue: 2, including Leo III of Armenia
- Father: Hugh III of Cyprus
- Mother: Isabella of Ibelin

Margaret of Poitiers-Lusignan (1276–1296) was queen of Armenia as the first wife of King Thoros III. She was queen from 1293 until her death, three years later. She had two sons, Leo III, who ruled for four years as king, and Bohemond, whose fate is unknown.

== Family ==
Margaret was born in 1276, a daughter of King Hugh III of Cyprus and Isabella of Ibelin. She had 10 siblings including King John I of Cyprus. She was a member of the cadet branch of the influential French Lusignan dynasty, which had ruled the Crusader states of Cyprus and Jerusalem since the late 12th century.

== Queen of Armenia ==
On 9 January 1288, she married Thoros, a son of King Leo II of Armenia. Pope Honorius IV granted a dispensation for their marriage; this was done and the dispensation was dated 23 May 1286. He became heir presumptive in 1289, and in 1293 succeeded his deposed brother Hethum II as king of the Armenian Kingdom of Cilicia. On 8 January 1290 at the age of about 13 or 14, Margaret gave birth to a son, Leo, who later ruled as king from 1303 until 7 November 1307, when he was murdered by a Mongol. She also had a second son, Bohemond, but his history is not known. Margaret was queen for three years until her own death in 1296 at the age of 20. Her husband subsequently married a Mongol woman whose name was not recorded.

== Sources ==
- Coureas, Nicholas (1997). The Latin Church in Cyprus, 1195–1312. Routledge.
- Edbury, Peter W. (1991). The Kingdom of Cyprus and the Crusades, 1191-1374. Cambridge University Press.
- Hill, George (1948). A History of Cyprus. Vol. 2. Cambridge University Press.

Margaret of Lusignan House of Lusignan Born: circa. 1276 Died: circa. 1296
Royal titles
Vacant Title last held by Keran	Queen consort of Armenia; 1293–1293	Vacant Title next held by a Mongol princess
