= Sarvanlar =

Sarvanlar may refer to:

- Sis, Armenia
- Sarvanlar, Aghjabadi, Azerbaijan
