= Oshin, King of Armenia =

King of Armenia from 1307 to 1320

Oshin Օշին
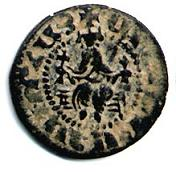

King of Armenia
- Reign: 1307–1320
- Predecessor: Levon III
- Successor: Levon IV
- Born: 1282
- Died: 20 July 1320 (aged 37–38)
- Spouse: Isabel of Korikos; Isabelle of Lusignan; Jeanne of Anjou
- Issue: Leo IV; George of Armenia
- House: Hethumids
- Father: Leo II
- Mother: Keran of Lampron

Oshin (Armenian: Օշին) (1282 – 20 July 1320) was king of the Armenian Kingdom of Cilicia, ruling from 1307 to 1320. He was a member of the House of Lampron, the son of Leo II, King of Armenia and Queen Keran.

Oshin became king after the murder of his nephew Leo III and brother Hethum II at a feast at the hands of the Mongol general Bilarghu. He was supported by the Mongol Ilkhan Oljeitu, who had ordered the execution of Bilarghu in response to their assassinations. Oshin then ascended to the throne of Cilician Armenia and initiated his reign by raising an army and driving out the Mongols. He did this as retribution for the murder of his nephew and brother at the hands of the Mongol governor general of Cilicia, Bilarghu. Mongol general Bilarghu, in charge of the Mongol garrison in Cilicia and a devout Muslim, indicated his intention to build a mosque in the capital Sis. Hethum II complained to Öljeitü Khan (1304-1316) in a letter. On 17 November 1307, Bilarghu summoned the regent and the king to his encampment near Anazarbus and had them assassinated with their retinue. Oshin immediately marched against Bilarghu and defeated him, forcing him to leave Cilicia. He was crowned king and supported by Öljeitü, who had Bilarghu executed for his crime. Öljeitü then supported Oshin to become king of Cilician Armenia and Oshin was crowned and ascended to the throne.

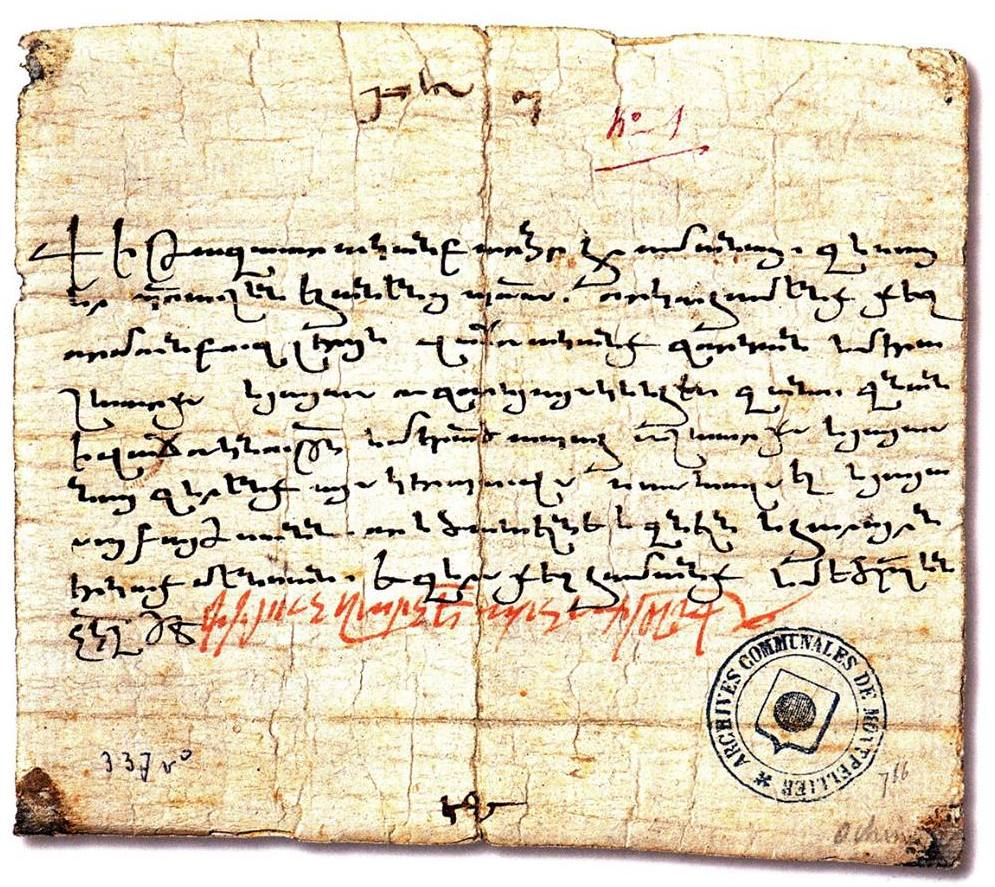
Privilege dated 7 January 1314 granted by the Cilician Armenian King Oshin to the merchants of Montpellier.

Like his brother Hethum II, Oshin favored a union of the Armenian and Roman churches, which aroused no little popular discontent. The unification of these churches was a precondition to obtain help from Europe, but also a matter of huge popular discontent as the Catholic Crusader states had previously been involved in a number of deadly border clashes with the Armenian Kingdom of Cilicia. Nevertheless, Oshin appealed to Christian Europe as by his reign, the kingdom of Armenian Cilicia to protect his regions against the Muslim Mamluk Empire and the Ilkhanate . The Mongols were no longer a reliable ally as they were themselves weakened by this point due to constant wars with the Mamluks and infighting within the state. In 1309, he had his wife's uncle Oshin, Marshal of Armenia, executed for the murder of his brother Thoros III.

His sister Isabella of Armenia had married Amalric of Tyre, and when Amalric usurped the government of Cyprus from his brother Henry II of Cyprus, Henry was held in Armenia by Oshin. He was, however, released and returned to Cyprus on the assassination of Amalric in 1310.

Oshin was married three times:

- First to his cousin, Isabel of Korikos, by whom he had one son, Leo IV (born 1309). She died in 1310.
- Second to Isabelle of Lusignan, daughter of the King Hugh III of Cyprus and widow of Constantine of Neghir, Lord of Partzerpert. Oshin divorced her before 1316. Isabelle died in 1319.
- Third to Joan of Taranto on February 1316 in Tarsus. She had one son with him, George (1317 – after 1323).

On his death on 20 July 1320, Oshin was succeeded by his minor son Leo IV (sometimes referred to as Leo V). It was popularly believed that Oshin was poisoned by his cousin (and brother-in-law) Oshin of Korikos.

Oshin, King of Armenia House of Lambron
Regnal titles
Preceded by Levon III	King of Armenia; 1307–1320	Succeeded by Levon IV
