= Leo II of Armenia =

Leo II of Armenia may refer to:

- Leo II, Prince of Armenia
- Leo II, King of Armenia
