= Constantine I, King of Armenia =

King of Armenia from 1298 to 1299

Constantine I Կոնստանտին Ա
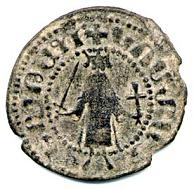

King of Armenia
- Reign: 1298–1299
- Predecessor: Sempad
- Successor: Hethum II
- Born: 1278
- Died: c. 1310
- House: Hethumids
- Father: Leo II
- Mother: Keran of Lampron

Constantine I (Armenian: Կոստանդին Ա, Western Armenian transliteration: Gosdantin or Kostantine;) (also called Constantine III; 1278 – c. 1310) was briefly king of the Armenian Kingdom of Cilicia from 1298 to 1299. He was the son of Leo II of Armenia and Kyranna de Lampron and was part of the Hetoumid-family or the House of Lampron.

He helped his brother Sempad to usurp the throne in 1296, but turned against him two years later in 1298 to restore his older brother Hethum II. He assumed the throne for a year while Hethum recovered from his imprisonment. Shortly after Hethum's resumption in 1299, Constantine plotted to restore Sempad again, and both were imprisoned for the rest of their lives.

Constantine I, King of Armenia House of Lambron
Regnal titles
Preceded by Smpad	King of Armenia; 1298–1299	Succeeded by Hethum II
