= Leo III of Armenia =

King of Armenian Cilicia until 1307

Leo III
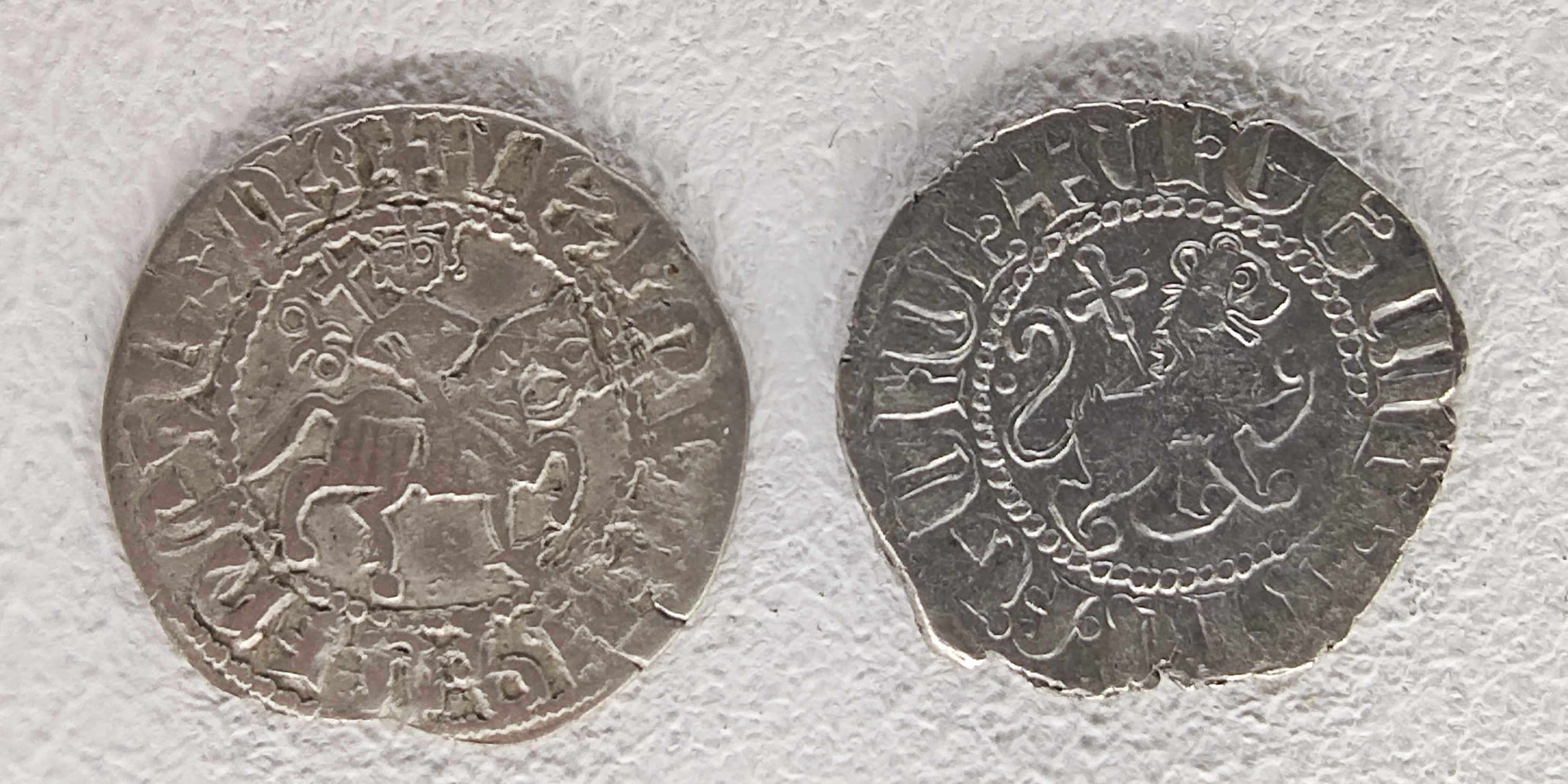
- A silver tagvorin of Levon III

King of Armenian Cilicia
- Reign: 1303 or 1305 to 1307
- Predecessor: Hethum II
- Successor: Oshin
- Regent: Hethum II
- Born: 1289
- Died: November 17, 1307 (aged 17–18); Anazarbus
- Spouse: Agnes (Marie) de Lusignan
- Father: Thoros III
- Mother: Margaret of Lusignan

Leo III (or Leon III; Armenian: Լեւոն Գ, romanized: Levon III; occasionally numbered Leo IV; 1289–1307) was a young king of the Armenian Kingdom of Cilicia, reigning from 1303 or 1305 to 1307, along with his uncle Hethum II. A member of the House of Lampron, he was the son of Thoros III of Armenia and Margaret of Lusignan, who was the daughter of King Hugh III of Cyprus.

In 1303, while still a minor, he was crowned King of Armenia upon the retirement of his uncle Hethum II, who became regent. Cilician Armenia at the time was in a volatile situation, maintaining a fragile relationship as a vassal state of the Mongol Empire, while defending from attacks by the Muslim Mamluks from the south. The throne of Armenia had changed hands multiple times during Leo's brief lifetime, being held variously by his uncle Hethum II in 1295, passed peacefully to his father Thoros III in 1296, then usurped by another uncle Sempad, who was usurped by his brother Constantine III, who himself was deposed by his brother Hethum II in 1299. Thoros III having been killed in 1298, Hethum then passed the crown to Thoros's son, Leo, in 1303.

In 1305, Hethum and Leo led the Armenian army to defeat a Mamluk raiding force at Bagras.

On November 17, 1307, Leo and Hethum were murdered with their retinue at a banquet while visiting the Mongol general Bilarghu at Anazarbus. Bilarghu, a Mongol who had converted to Islam, had sought to build a mosque in the capital city of Sis, but Hethum had blocked the move as he wanted Armenia to be a completely Christian kingdom and complained to the leader of the Mongol Ilkhanate, Oljeitu. Bilarghu invited Hethum, Leo, and many other important Armenian nobles to a banquet at the castle of Anazarbus, presumably for discussions, but then his forces suddenly attacked and massacred the Armenians while they were having their meals and all of the Armenian nobles were killed along with Leo and his uncle Hethum II. Bilarghu was later executed by the Mongol ilkhan Oljeitu for his actions.

Leo was succeeded as king by another of his uncles, Oshin.

== Family ==
He was married to his cousin Agnes (Marie) (died 1309), daughter of Isabella of Armenia and Amalric of Tyre, without issue.

Leo III of Armenia House of Lambron
Regnal titles
Preceded by Hethum II	King of Armenia; 1303–1307	Succeeded by Oshin
