= Hethum II =

King of Cilician Armenia (1266–1307)

Hethum II Հեթում Բ
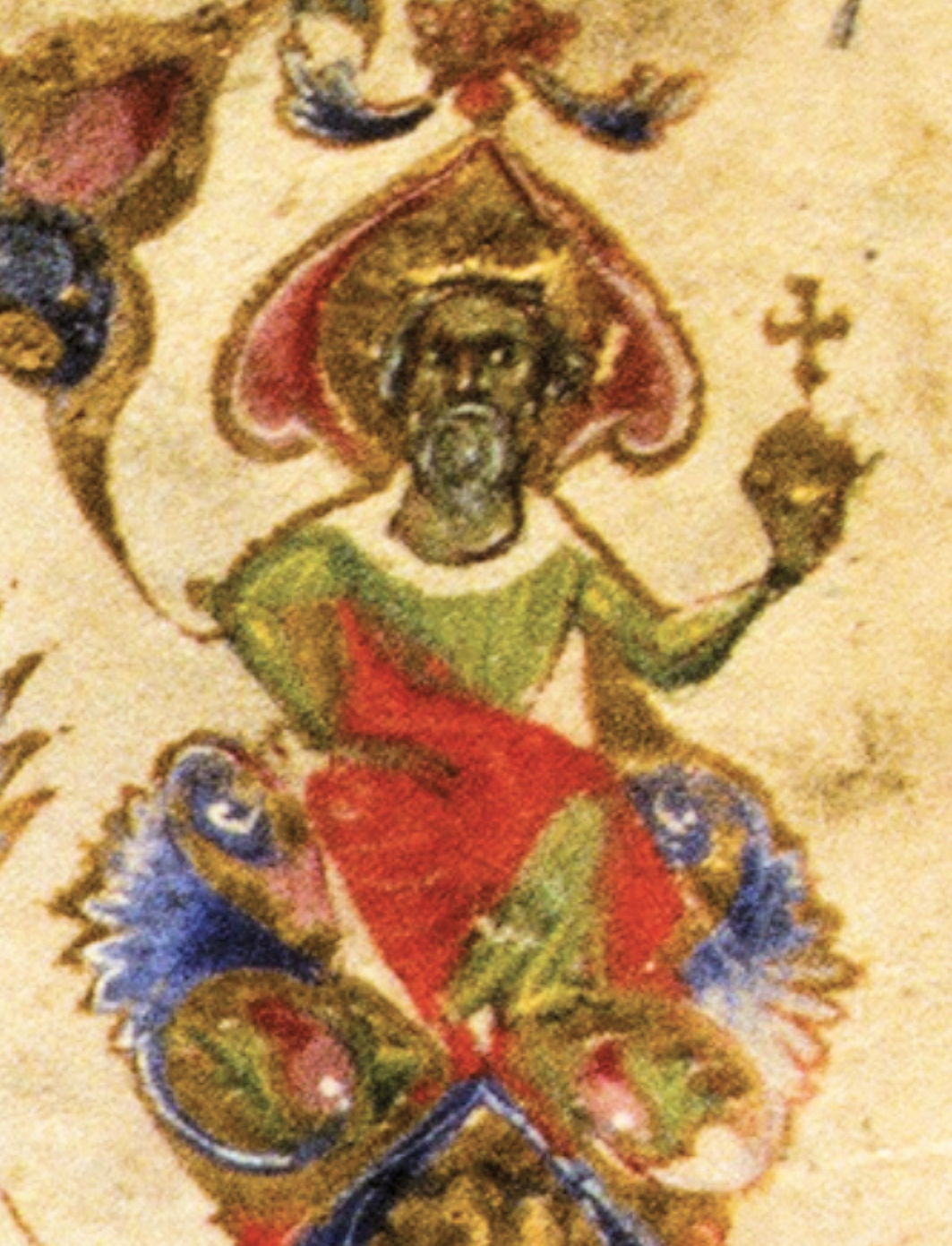
- Portrait of Hethum II, 1286

King of Cilician Armenia
- Reign: 1289–1293
- Predecessor: Leo II
- Successor: Thoros III

King of Cilician Armenia
- Reign: 1295–1296
- Predecessor: Thoros III
- Successor: Sempad
- Co-ruler: Thoros III

King of Cilician Armenia
- Reign: 1299–1303
- Predecessor: Constantine I
- Successor: Leo III

Regent of Cilician Armenia
- Regency: 1303–1307
- Monarch: Leo III
- Born: 1266
- Died: 17 November 1307 (aged 40–41); Anazarbus
- Dynasty: Hethumids
- Father: Leo II
- Mother: Keran of Lampron
- Religion: Armenian Church

Hethum II, OFM (Armenian: Հեթում Բ; 1266 – 17 November 1307) was king of the Armenian Kingdom of Cilicia from 1289 to 1293, 1295 to 1296 and 1299 to 1303, while Armenia was a subject state of the Mongol Empire. He abdicated twice to take vows with the Franciscans, while still remaining the power behind the throne as "Grand Baron of Armenia" and later as Regent for his nephew.

He was the son of King Leo II of Armenia and Queen Keran, and was part of the Hethumid dynasty, being the grandson of Hethum I, who had originally submitted Cilicia to the Mongols in 1247. Hethum II was assassinated with his nephew and successor Leo III by the Mongol general Bilarghu, who himself was later executed for this by the Mongol Ilkhanid ruler Öljaitü.

== First reign ==
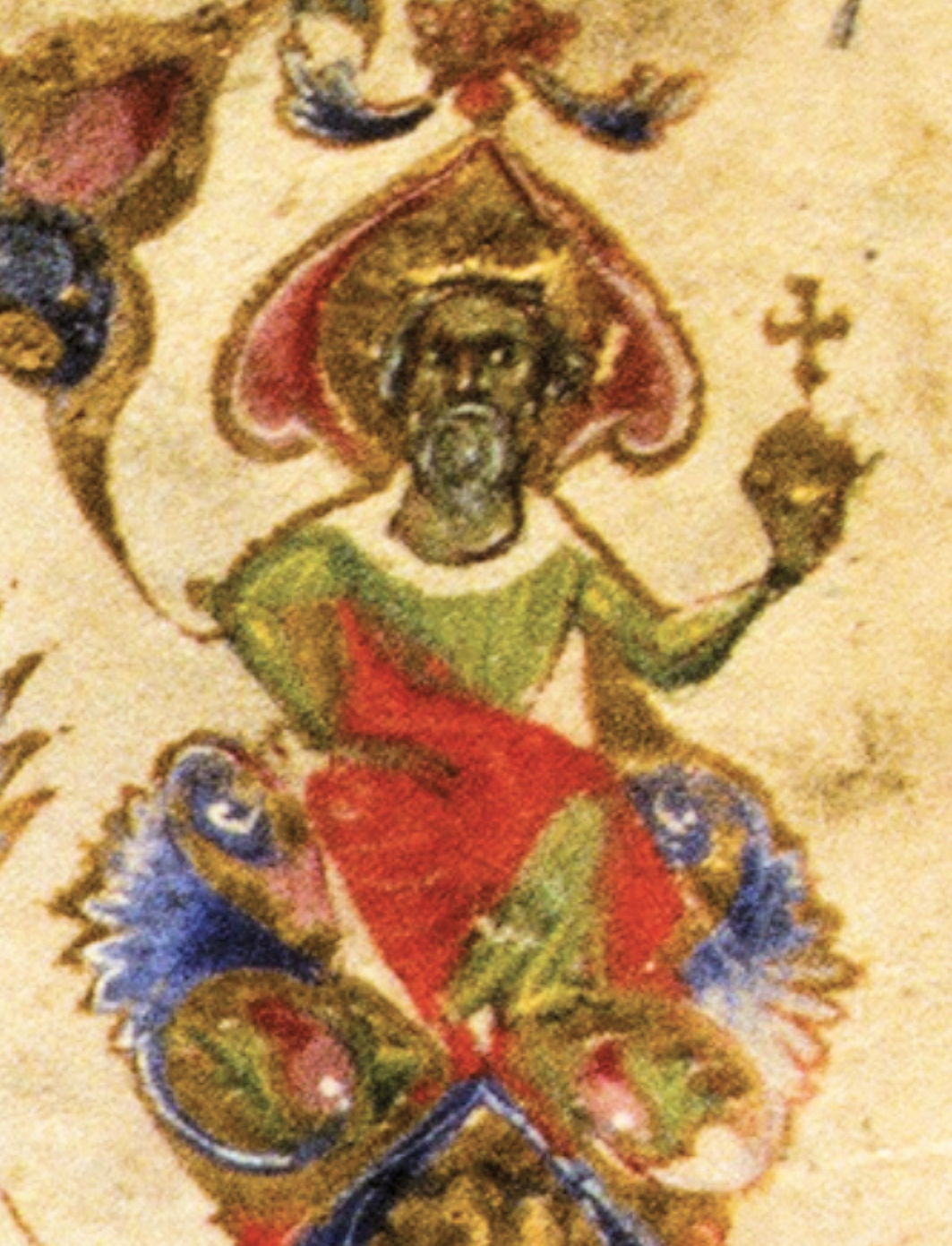
Portrait of Hethum II from Lectionary of Hethum II, 1286

Since 1247, Cilician Armenia itself had been a vassal state of the Mongol Empire, from an agreement made by Hethum II's grandfather, Hethum I. As part of this relationship, Cilician Armenia routinely supplied troops to the Mongols, cooperating in battles against the Mamluks and other elements of the Islamic empire.

Hethum II took the throne in his early 20s, when his father Leon II died in 1289. At the time, Cilician Armenia was in a precarious position between major powers, balancing between friendly relations with the Christian European Crusaders and Byzantine Empire, aggression from the Turkish Karamanids to the west and the Turkish Sultanate of Rum to the north, a vassal relationship with the aggressive Mongol Empire in the east, and defending itself from attacks from the south, from the Muslim Mamluk Sultanate out of Egypt. The Crusades had lost European support and were winding down, and Islamic forces were sweeping northwards from Mamluk Egypt, re-taking land which had earlier been lost to the Crusaders and Mongols, and pushing back against the Mongol advance.

In 1289, Angelo da Clareno and a few other Spiritual Franciscans arrived to missionize among the Armenian Christians. They had been repeatedly jailed in Italy for their strong condemnations of luxury in the church but they won favor at the Armenian court. St Thomas of Tolentino was sent by Hethum to Rome, Paris, and London to advocate another crusade to support the Armenians; he failed in this, but returned with additional clerics to support the mission and advocate the reunification of the Armenian Church with Rome.

In 1292, Cilician Armenia was invaded by Khalil, the Mamluk sultan of Egypt. His father the Mamluk sultan Qalawun had earlier broken the treaty of 1285, was marching North through Palestine with his troops, and also demanded the surrender of the Armenian cities of Marash and Behesni. Qalawun died before the campaign was completed, but Khalil continued his father's advance northwards, and had conquered the Kingdom of Jerusalem in 1291 at the Siege of Acre. Khalil's forces continued on from there, sacking the Armenian city of Hromgla, which was defended by Hethum's uncle, Raymond, but fell after a siege of 33 days. To stave off further invasion, Hethum II abandoned the cities of Marash, Behesni, and Tel Hamdoun to the Mamluks.

In 1293, Hethum abdicated in favor of his brother Thoros III and entered the Franciscan monastery at Mamistra. He did stay active in the politics of the kingdom though, and negotiated with the Egyptian leader Ketbougha for the return of the prisoners who had been taken at Hromgla, as well as for some church relics which had been pillaged.

== Second reign ==
In 1295, Thoros III asked Hethum to resume the throne to help renew the Mongol alliance. Hethum made the long journey to the Mongol capital, and was successfully able to request aid from the Mongols. When he returned to Armenia in 1296, further good news manifested from the Byzantine Empire, with an offer of a marital alliance. Hethum and Thoros placed Armenia under the regency of their brother Sempad, and traveled to Constantinople to bestow their sister Rita upon the Byzantine Emperor Michael IX Palaeologus. However, during their absence Sempad usurped the Armenian throne with the aid of another brother, Constantine. Hethum and Thoros were both captured in Caesarea upon their return, and imprisoned in the fortress of Partzerpert. There, Hethum was partially blinded by cauterization. Thoros was murdered in Partzerpert in 1298; but Constantine turned against Sempad, usurped the throne for himself, imprisoned Sempad and freed Hethum.

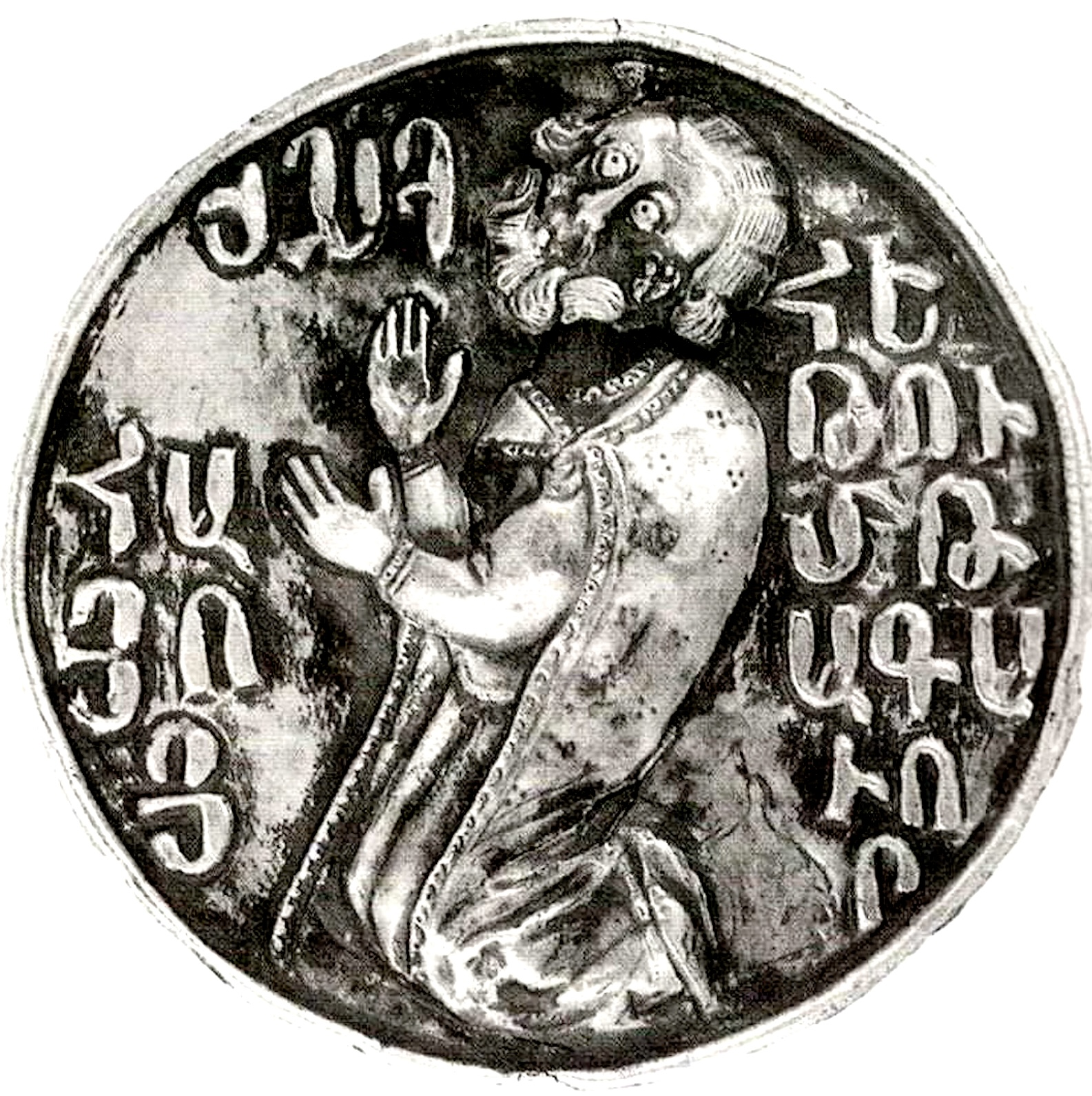
King Hethum II in prayer from a decorative plate

== Third reign ==
1299/1300 Mongol offensive in the Levant

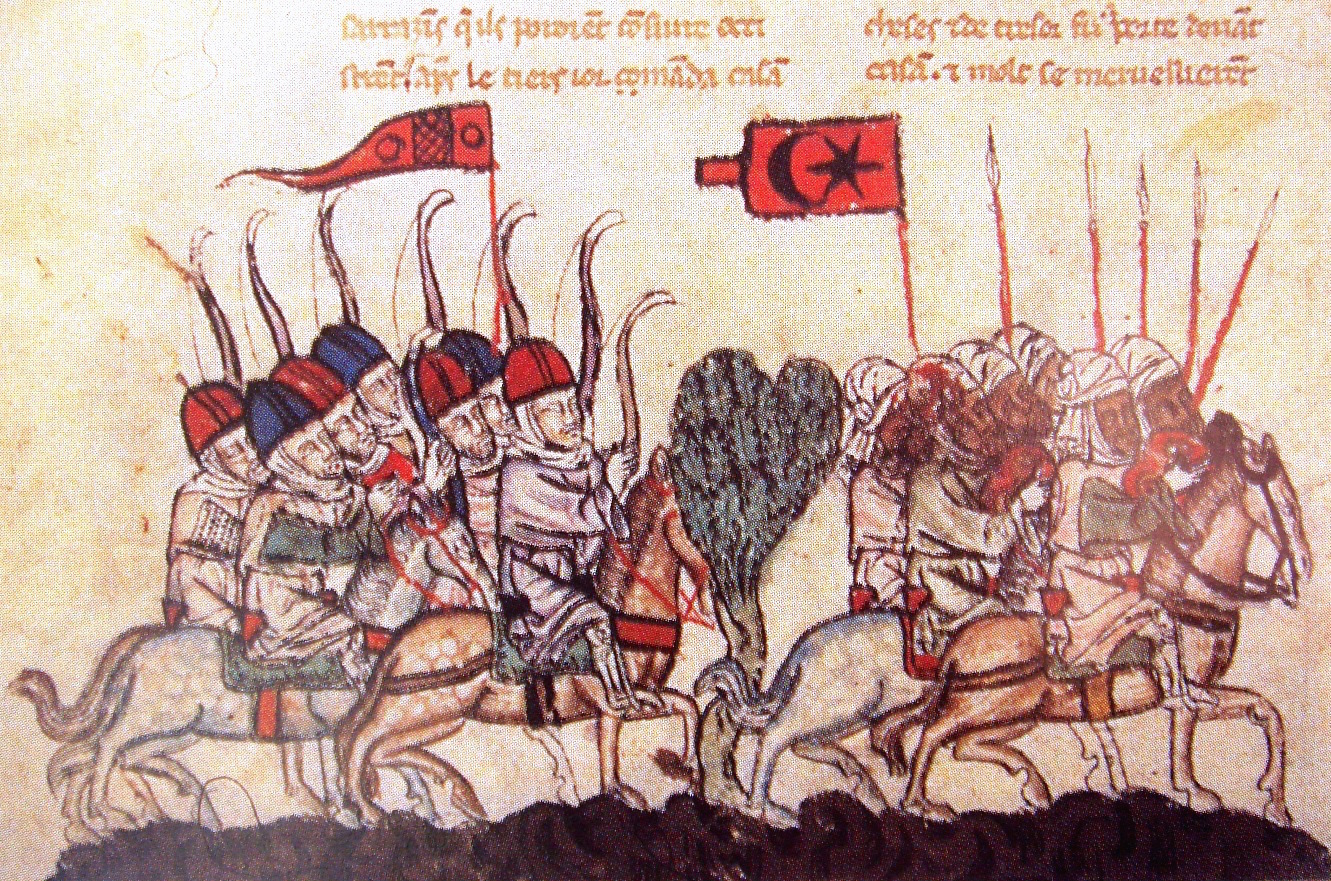
The Armenians fought with the Mongols (left) and vanquished the Mamluks (right) at the 1299 Battle of Homs. (History of the Tatars)

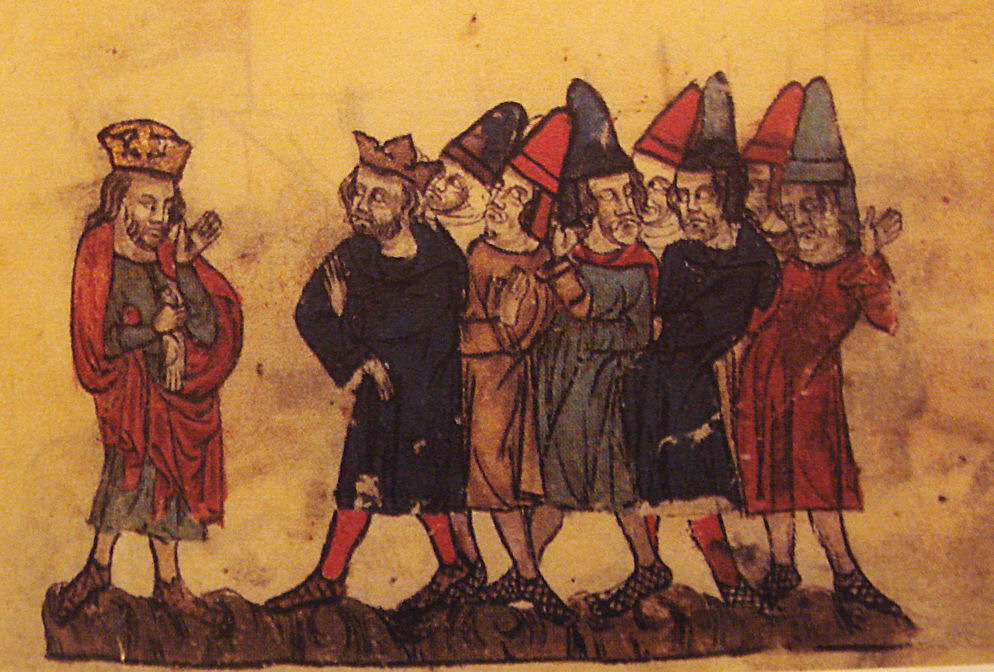
Hethum II (left) parting from Ghazan and his Mongols in 1303 (History of the Tatars)

In 1299, Hethum, recovered at least partially from his blindness, ousted Constantin and once again resumed the crown. Soon thereafter, he again sought assistance from Ghazan's Mongols, and fought against the Mamluks in Syria. The combined forces achieved a major victory at the December 1299 Battle of Wadi al-Khazandar (sometimes called the Battle of Homs), taking Damascus, and Hethum was able to regain all of the Armenian territory which had previously been lost to the Mamluks. One group of Mongols split off from Ghazan's army and was even able to launch some Mongol raids into Palestine, pursuing the retreating Egyptian Mamluk troops as far south as Gaza, pushing them back to Egypt.

According to modern traditions, Hethum may have visited Jerusalem in 1300 during this time. However, historians disagree as to whether or not the visit actually occurred. Angus Donal Stewart points out that the source of the tradition, a medieval account by the Armenian historian Nerses Balients, does not match with any other accounts by any other historians of the time period, and was simply written as Armenian propaganda of the time. However, Claude Mutafian, in Le Royaume Arménien de Cilicie, suggests that it may have been on this occasion that Hethum remitted his amber scepter to the Armenian convent of Saint James of Jerusalem.

The king of Armenia, back from his raid against the Sultan, went to Jerusalem. He found that all the enemies had been put to flight or exterminated by the Tatars, who had arrived before him. As he entered into Jerusalem, he gathered the Christians, who had been hiding in caverns out of fright. During the 15 days he spent in Jerusalem, he held Christian ceremonies and solemn festivities in the Holy Sepulchre. He was greatly comforted by his visits to the places of the pilgrims. He was still in Jerusalem when he received a certificate from the Khan, bestowing him Jerusalem and the surrounding country. He then returned to join Ghazan in Damas, and spend the winter with him

— Nerses Balients, in Recueil des Historiens des Croisades, Historiens Armeniens I, p.660

Speculation aside, the Mongols retreated northwards a few months later, and the Mamluks reclaimed Palestine with little resistance.

Hethum's gains against the Mamluks were short-lived, as in 1303, the Mamluks counter-attacked from Egypt. The Armenians again joined forces with a sizable number of Mongol troops, 80,000, on a Syrian offensive, but they were defeated at Homs on 30 March 1303, and at the decisive Battle of Shaqhab (Merj-us-Safer), south of Damas, on 21 April 1303. This campaign is considered to be the last major Mongol invasion of Syria. Hethum retreated to Ghazan's court in Moussoul, and then again resigned his crown. His brother Thoros III having been killed in 1298, Hethum passed the crown to Thoros's teenaged son, Leo III. Hethum retired to a monastery, although as Leo was not yet an adult, Hethum retained the office of Regent of Armenia.

== Later years ==
The Armenian Kingdom of Cilicia, 1199–1375

In 1304, the Mamluks continued their assault on Cilician Armenia, and succeeded in taking back all the lands which the Armenians had acquired during the Mongol invasion. The Mamluks wanted to punish the Armenians for allying with the Mongols.

The Armenian Kingdom of Cilicia's alignment with the Mongol Empire continued, motivated as much by the need for self-protection from the Seljuk Sultanate of Rûm on their western borders as self-interest in acquiring territory to the east, albeit short-lived. Following the conversion of the Mongol Ilkhan Ghazan to Islam in 1295, his successor Öljaitü exercised less control over outlying countries under Mongol protection and reduced the military campaigns against the Mamluks in Syria. According to contemporary Arabic and Persian accounts, one of his generals, Bilarghu, a devout Muslim, had indicated his intention to erect a mosque in the city of Sis, still part of the Christian Kingdom of Armenia, possibly as part of a wider plan to place the province under his own control. Hethum conveyed his worries about these plans by letter to Öljaitü. He was subsequently summoned by Bilarghu to a meeting on 17 November 1307, in an encampment beneath the walls of the royal stronghold of Anazarbus (Caesarea in the Roman province of Cilicia), either to hold counsel or for a banquet. Hethum attended with about 40 noblemen and his young nephew King Leon, for whom as Grand Baron he was acting as regent. Bilarghu, however, had learnt of Hethum's letter and ordered his men to massacre the Armenian king and his guests upon their arrival. When the Armenians arrived for the banquet, they were massacred while having their meals along with Hethum and his nephew King Leon. Following this assassination, Hethum's brother Oshin, heir to the throne, occupied Sis. He sent another brother Alinakh to report on Bilarghu's treachery to Öljaitü, who ordered the immediate execution of Bilarghu and his soldiers and confirmed his support of Oshin as king as Leo III had no heirs since he was too young to marry when he was murdered.

== Notes ==
Hethum II House of Lambron
Regnal titles
Preceded by Leo II	King of Armenia; 1289–1293	Succeeded by Thoros III
Preceded by Thoros III	King of Armenia; 1295–1296	Succeeded by Sempad
Preceded by Constantine I	King of Armenia; 1299–1303	Succeeded by Leo III
