= Nerses Balients =

Nerses Balients, also Nerses Balienc (Armenian: Ներսէս Պալիանենց, Պալիենց, Պալիանց) or Nerses Bagh'on, was a Christian Armenian monk of the early 14th century. He is mainly known for writing a history of the Kingdom of Cilician Armenia. Though his works are regarded by modern scholars as a valuable source from the time period, they are also regarded as frequently unreliable.

== Life ==
Nerses Balients had been converted to Catholicism by the Dominicans. He was a member of the "United Brothers" (or "Unitarians") founded by the Dominican Barthelemy of Bologna, bishop of Maragha, which advocated a strict union of the Armenian Church with the Catholic Church. According to his writings, Nerses also used to call himself "Bishop of Urmia".

He visited Pope Clement V in Avignon and authored and translated various works while there.

== Writings ==
Nerses Balients is the author of a history of the kings of Cilician Armenia, especially as regards their relations with the Mongols.

== Combination with Sempad ==
Segments of the work of Nerses Balients have been inserted into Sempad's Chronique du Royaume de Petite Arménie, a version of which was compiled by the modern historian Edouard Dulaurier, who added information from Nerses Balients to expand on the period after Sempad's death.

== Controversy ==
One challenged passage in this work is where Nerses wrote that the Armenian King Hetoum II, during his 1299 offensives in Syria with the Mongols, went with a small force as far as the outskirts of Cairo, and then spent some fifteen days in Jerusalem visiting the Holy Places:

The king of Armenia, back from his raid against the Sultan, went to Jerusalem. He found that all the enemies had been put to flight or exterminated by the Tatars, who had arrived before him. As he entered into Jerusalem, he gathered the Christians, who had been hiding in caverns out of fright. During the 15 days he spent in Jerusalem, he held Christian ceremonies and solemn festivities in the Holy Sepulchre. He was greatly comforted by his visits to the places of the pilgrims. He was still in Jerusalem when he received a certificate from the Khan, bestowing him Jerusalem and the surrounding country. He then returned to join Ghazan in Damas, and spend the winter with him

— Recueil des Historiens des Croisades, Historiens Armeniens I, p.660

Some historians considered Nerses Balient's statement as an indication that Mongols may have conquered, or at least been present in, Jerusalem in 1299. Claude Mutafian, in Le Royaume Arménien de Cilicie mentions the writings and the 14th century Armenian Dominican which claim that the Armenian king visited Jerusalem as it was temporarily removed from Muslim rule. Alain Demurger, in Jacques de Molay, mentions the possibility that the Mongols may have occupied Jerusalem, quoting an Armenian tradition describing that Hethoum celebrated mass in Jerusalem in January 1300. Some scholars, such as Dr. Sylvia Schein, have regarded this statement as an indication that Mongols may have been present in Jerusalem in 1299. In her 1991 book, Schein wrote that the Armenian information about Hetoum's visit was confirmed by Arab chroniclers.

However, other historians have strongly criticized Nerses Balienc's statement, and Schein's interpretation. Dr. Angus Donal Stewart in his 2001 book The Armenian Kingdom and the Mamluks, called the statement by Nerses Balienc an "absurd claim" from an unreliable source, and said that the Arab chroniclers did not confirm it in any way. Another historian, Reuven Amitai, also did a detailed comparison of all of the available primary sources about the events around the Battle of Wadi al-Khazindar, and concluded that the Armenian account was in error, as it did not match up with other similar sources about the same events, was provably full of exaggerations and inaccuracies, and had been written as to glorify the Armenian king Hetoum. Amitai also pointed out that despite Schein's acceptance of the source as genuine, that even the original editor of the work, Edouard Dulaurier, had denied the veracity of the Armenian account.

In his work, Edouard Dulaurier actually writes that Nerses may have added a few fantastic details to exaggerate Hetoum's accomplishments somewhat, specifically disputing one instance in which Nerses claims that Hetoum went as far as Cairo, when Ghazan himself is known to have sent 15,000 men only as far as Gaza.
