= Thoros III =

King of Armenia from 1293 to 1296

Banner or sigil of the House of Lampron, the ruling house of Armenian Cilicia

Thoros III or Toros III (Armenian: Թորոս Երրորդ, same as Theodore; c. 1271 – 23 July 1298) was king of the Armenian Kingdom of Cilicia, ruling from 1293 to 1296. He was the son of Leo II of Armenia and Kyranna de Lampron, and was part of the House of Lampron. In 1293 his brother Hethum II abdicated in his favour; however, Thoros recalled Hethum to the throne as co-ruler in 1295. The two brought their sister Rita of Armenia to Constantinople to marry the Byzantine emperor Michael IX Palaiologos in 1296, but were imprisoned upon their return in Bardzrberd by their brother Sempad, who had usurped the throne in their absence. Thoros was murdered, strangled to death on 23 July 1298, in Bardzrberd by Oshin, Marshal of Armenia, on Sempad's orders.

== Family ==
Thoros was married twice; his first marriage, to Margaret of Lusignan (ca 1276–1296, Armenia) (the daughter of King Hugh III of Cyprus), took place on 9 January 1288. His only son, by his first marriage, was Leo III of Armenia, who became heir to his uncle Hethum II. Leo ruled from 1303 to 1307, but was murdered along with his uncle by the Mongol general Bilarghu at a feast.

== Sources ==
- Boase, T. S. R. (1978). The Cilician Kingdom of Armenia. Edinburgh: Scottish Academic Press. ISBN 0-7073-0145-9.
- Edbury, Peter W. (1994). The Kingdom of Cyprus and the Crusades, 1191-1374. Cambridge University Press.
- Geanakoplos, Deno (1975). "Byzantium and the Crusades, 1261-1354". In Setton, Kenneth M.; Hazard, Harry W. (eds.). A History of the Crusades, Volume III: The Fourteenth and Fifteenth Centuries. Vol. 3. Madison and London: University of Wisconsin Press. ISBN 0-299-06670-3.
- Cambridge Medieval History, Volume IV, p. 634

Thoros III Hethumids
Regnal titles
Preceded by Hethum II	King of Armenia; 1293–1296	Succeeded by Sempad
