= Hethumids =

Medieval Armenian dynasty

Hethumids Հեթումյաններ
- Hethumid coat of arms
- Parent house: Pahlavuni (partly)
- Country: Armenian Kingdom of Cilicia
- Founded: 1226
- Founder: Oshin of Lampron, Hethum I
- Final ruler: Leo IV
- Titles: King of Cilicia; Prince of Cyprus; Prince of Antioch; Prince of Tyre; Lord of Lampron; Lord of Barbaron; Lord of Korikos; Lord of Tarsus; Archbishop of Sis
- Dissolution: 1341

The Hethumids (Armenian: Հեթումյաններ Hethumian) (also spelled Hetoumids or Het'umids), also known as the House of Lampron (after Lampron castle), were an Armenian dynasty and the rulers of the Armenian Kingdom of Cilicia from 1226 to 1341. Hethum I, the first of the Hethumids, came to power when he married Queen Isabella of Armenia who had inherited the throne from her father.

== History ==
The Hethumid dynasty was established when Constantine's grandson, Hethum I, was appointed as the ruler of Cilicia by the Mongol Empire. Hethum I expanded the kingdom's territory and forged close ties with the Mongol Empire, which allowed him to maintain autonomy and protection from external threats.

Under the Hethumids, the Armenian Kingdom of Cilicia reached its cultural and economic peak. The dynasty was known for its support of the arts, literature, and architecture, which led to the construction of magnificent buildings and the creation of beautiful artworks. The Hethumid rulers also maintained alliances with the Crusaders and other European powers, which brought significant economic and political benefits to the kingdom.

However, the kingdom's fortunes began to decline in the 14th century, and it eventually fell to the Mamluk Sultanate in 1375. Despite its ultimate demise, the Hethumid dynasty left a lasting legacy in Armenian history and culture.

== Hethumid Kings of Armenia ==
- Hethum (or Hetoum) I (1226–1270)
- Leo II (1270–1289) – son of Hethum I
- Hethum II (1289–1293) – son of Leo II
- Thoros III (1293–1298) – son of Leo II
- Hethum II (1294–1297: second reign)
- Smbat (1297–1299) – son of Leo II
- Constantine I (III) (1299) – son of Leo II
- Hethum II (1299–1301: third reign), regent 1301–1307
- Leo III (1301–1307) – son of Thoros III
- Oshin (1307–1320) – son of Leo II
- Leo IV (1320–1341) – son of Oshin

Armenia passed then to the Lusignans.

== Sources ==
- Toumanoff, C. (2010). "KAMSARAKAN". In Yarshater, Ehsan (ed.). Encyclopædia Iranica. Vol. XV/5: Ḵamsa of Jamāli–Karim Devona. London and New York: Routledge & Kegan Paul. pp. 453–455. ISBN 978-1-934283-28-8.
