= Leo II, King of Armenia =

King of Armenian Cilicia from 1269/70 to 1289

Leo II Լէոն Բ
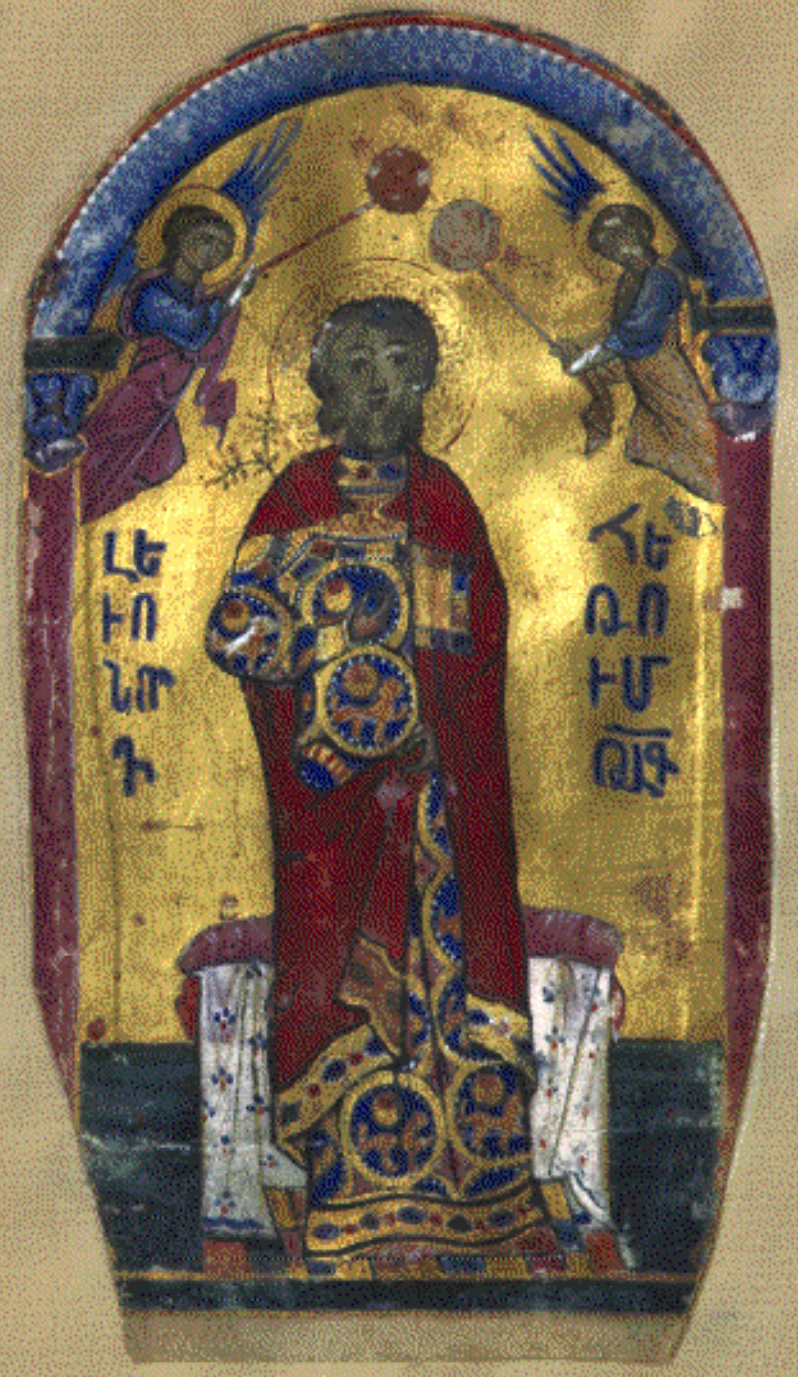
- Portrait of Prince Levon by Toros Roslin, 1250.

King of the Armenian Kingdom of Cilicia
- Reign: 1269/1270 – 1289
- Predecessor: Hethum I
- Successor: Hethum II
- Born: 1236
- Died: 1289 (aged 52–53)
- Spouse: Keran of Lampron
- Issue among others: Hethum II, King of Armenia; Thoros III, King of Armenia; Sempad, King of Armenia; Isabella, Princess of Tyre; Constantine I, King of Armenia; Rita, Byzantine Empress; Oshin, King of Armenia
- House: Lambron
- Father: Hetoum I, King of Armenia
- Mother: Isabella, Queen of Armenia
- Religion: Armenian Apostolic

Leo II or Leon II (occasionally numbered Leo III; Armenian: Լէոն Բ, Levon II; c. 1236 – 1289) was king of the Armenian Kingdom of Cilicia, ruling from 1269/1270 to 1289. He was the son of King Hetoum I and Queen Isabella and was a member of the House of Lampron.

== Early life ==
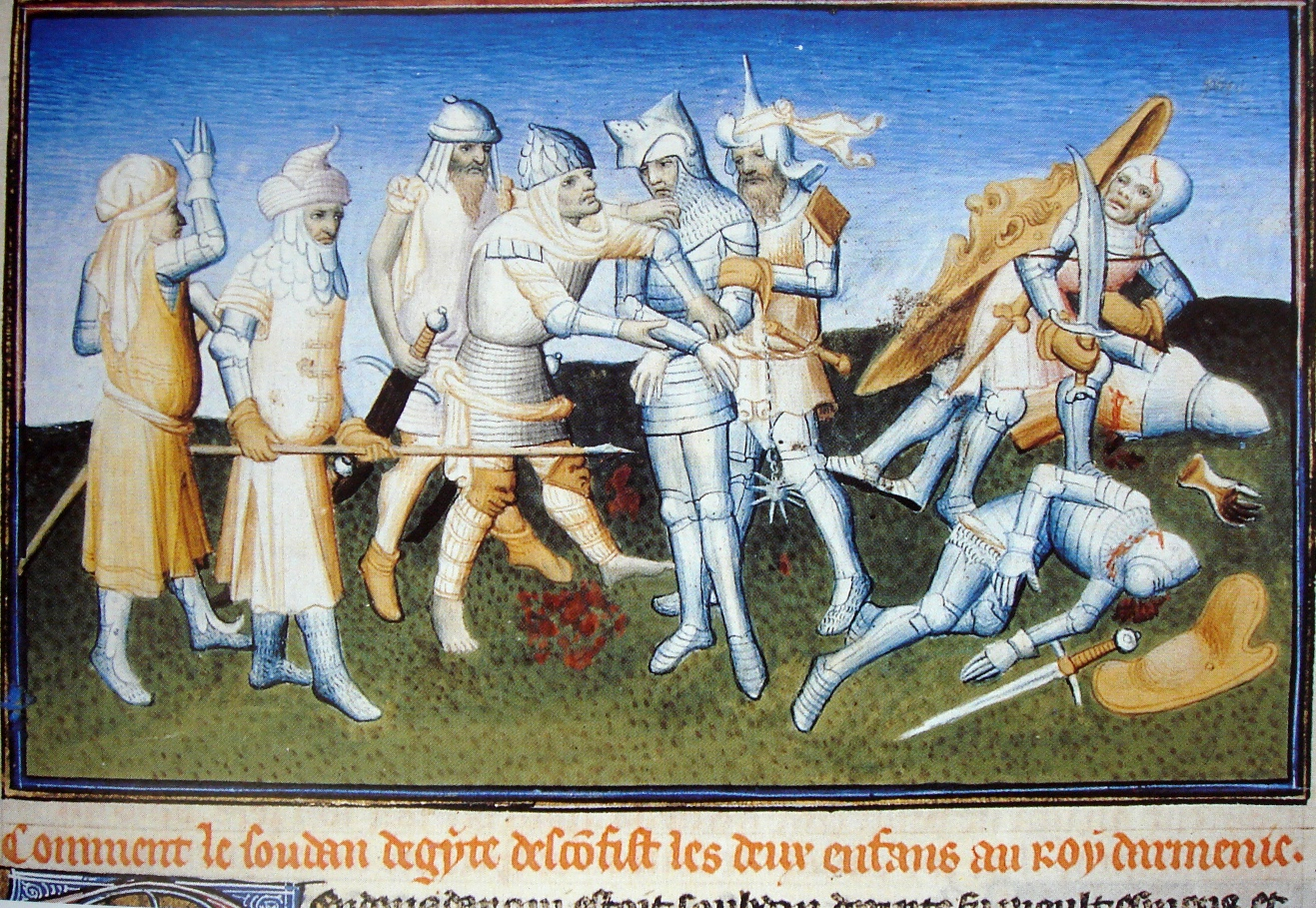
The Mamluks kill Thoros and capture Leo at the disaster of Mari, 1266: illumination from Le Livre des Merveilles, 15th century

Leo was born in 1236, the son of King Hetoum I and Queen Isabella. Hetoum and Isabella's marriage in 1226 had been forced on them by Hetoum's father Constantine of Baberon, who had cleared the way for Hetoum by arranging the murder of Queen Isabella's first husband. They had six children, of which Leo was the eldest. One of his sisters was Sibylla of Armenia, who was married to Bohemond VI of Antioch to bring peace between Armenia and Antioch.

In 1262, Leo married Keran (Kir Anna), the daughter of Prince Hetoum of Lampron. Thus, he solidified himself as a member of the House of Lampron.

In 1266, while their father king Hetoum I was away to visit the Mongol court, Leo and his younger brother Thoros fought to repel a massive army of Mamluk invaders, at the Battle of Mari. Thoros was killed in combat, and Leo was captured and imprisoned. Following the disaster, the cities of Adana, Tarsus, and Ayas were assaulted and the capital of Sis was sacked and burnt. Thousands of Armenians were massacred and 40,000 taken captive. When King Hetoum returned, he paid a large ransom to retrieve his son, including a large quantity of money, handing over several fortresses, and accepting to intercede with the Mongol ruler Abagha in order to have one of Baybars's relatives freed.

== Reign ==
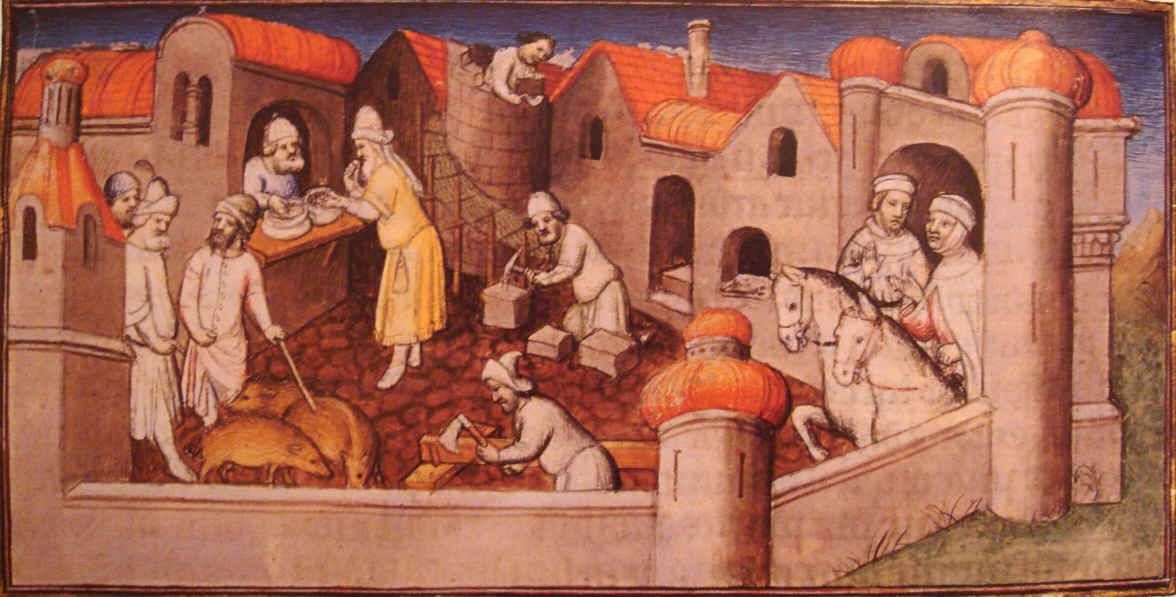
A view of the busy port of Ayas when Marco Polo visited it in 1271, in "Le Livre des Merveilles".

Hetoum I abdicated in 1269 in favour of his son, and entered the Franciscan order. He died a year later. The new king Leo II was known as a pious king, devoted to Christianity. He pursued active commercial relations with the West, by renewing trade agreements with the Italians and establishing new ones with the Catalans. He also endeavoured to reinforce the Mongol alliance, as his father Hetoum I had submitted Armenia to Mongol authority in 1247.

In 1271, Marco Polo visited the Armenian harbour of Ayas and commented favourably about Leo's reign and the abundance of the country, although he mentions his military forces were rather demoralized:

"The king [Leo II] properly maintains justice in his land, and is a vassal of the Tartars. There are many cities and villages, and everything in abundance.(...) In the past, men were courageous at war, but today they are vile and chetive, and don't have other talents than drink properly."

— Marco Polo "Le Livre des Merveilles"

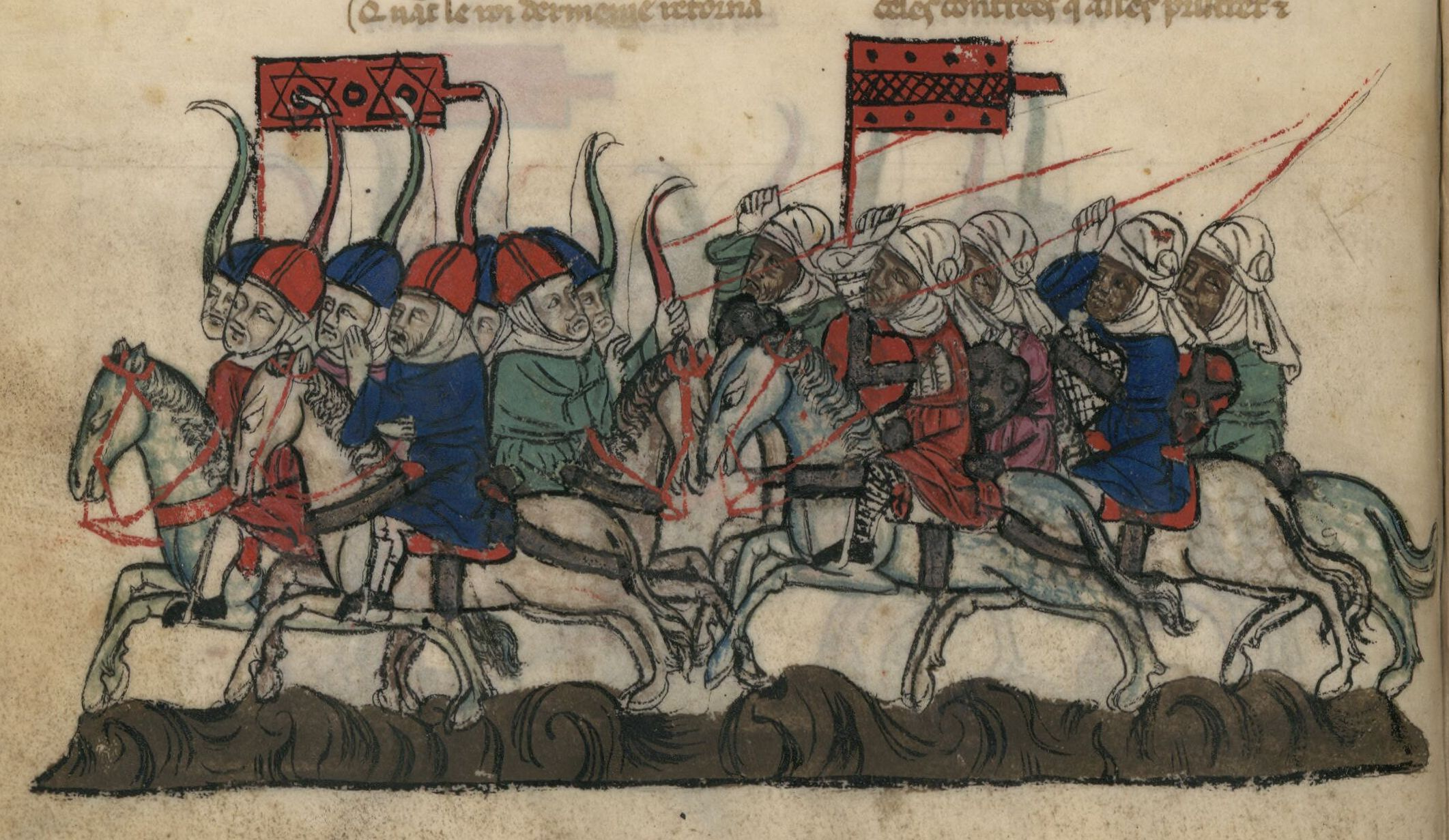
The Mongols and the Armenians were defeated by the Mamluks at the Second Battle of Homs in 1281.

In 1275, the Mamluk sultan Baybars invaded Cilicia for a second time. The following year, Armenia fought off an invasion by the Turkoman tribes, but the Constable Sempad, Leo's uncle, was killed in combat.

=== Mongol alliance ===
In 1281, Leo joined the Mongols in their invasion of Syria, but they were vanquished at the Second Battle of Homs. Leo had to sue for peace, and in 1285 obtained a 10-year truce in exchange for important territorial concessions in favour of the Mamluks.

Leo died in 1289 from arsenic, and was succeeded by his son Hetoum II.

== Descendants ==
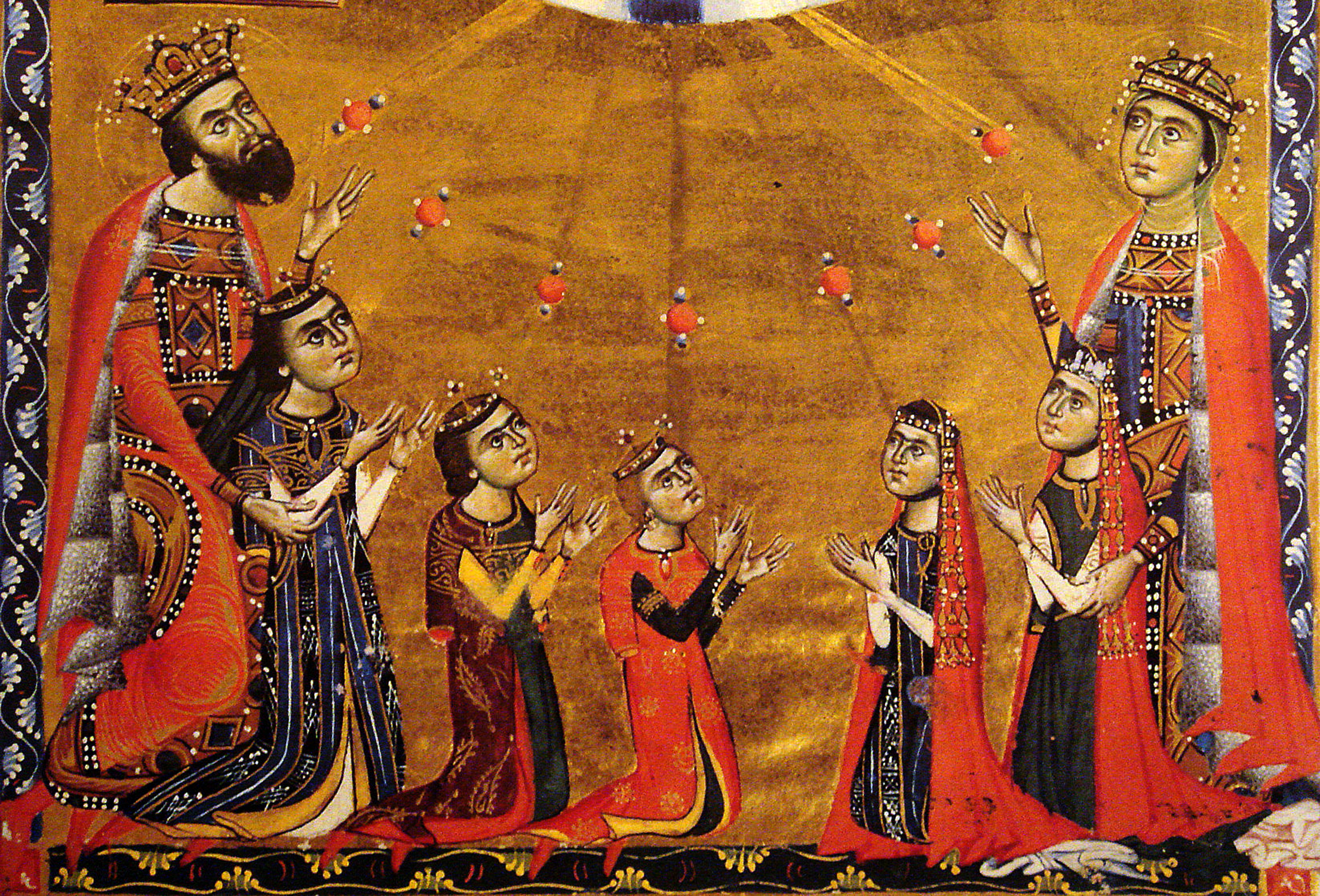
Leo II, queen Guerane, and their five children, 1272.

Leo II and Queen Guerane. Armenian manuscript of Queen Keran gospel, 1272.

During twenty-one years of marriage Leo had sixteen children by his wife Keran, ten sons and six daughters. Five of his children reached the throne. The eldest, Hethum II of Armenia, abdicated after four years in favor of his younger brother Thoros III of Armenia, but was placed back on the throne in 1294. In 1296, their brother Sempad of Armenia blinded Hetoum and in 1298 he strangled Thoros, in order to seize power. Sempad was then overthrown in 1298 by their younger brother Constantine I of Armenia, who was replaced by older brother Hethum II, who then abdicated in 1305 in favor of Thoros III's son Leo III of Armenia, who was murdered in 1307 with his uncle Hethum II at the hands of the Mongol general Bilarghu, being succeeded by one of the youngest surviving children of Leo and Keran, Oshin of Armenia. Eventually, the inheritance of the Armenian Kingdom was passed to the descendants of Leo and Keran's eldest surviving daughter Isabella of Armenia, wife of Amalric of Lusignan, Lord of Tyre.

1. Son (b. 15 January 1262/14 January 1263 – d. young).
2. Constantine (b. June 1265 – d. young).
3. Fimi [Euphemia] (b. ca. 14 January 1266 – d. young).
4. Hethum II (b. ca. 13 January 1267 – murdered 7 November 1307), King of Armenia (ruled 1289 to 1293, 1294 to 1297, 1299 to 1307).
5. Isabella [Zabel] (b. 13 January 1269/12 January 1270 – d. bef. 1273).
6. Thoros III (b. October 1270 – murdered 23 July 1298), King of Armenia (ruled 1293 to 1298).
7. Ruben (b. 13 January 1272/12 January 1273 – d. young)
8. Isabella [Zabel] (b. 12 January 1273/11 January 1274 – d. bef. 1276)
9. Sempad (b. 12 January 1276/11 January 1277 – d. 1310 or 1311), King of Armenia (ruled 1297 to 1299).
10. Isabella [Zabel] (b. 12 January 1276/11 January 1277 – murdered May 1323), twin with Sempad; married in 1293 with Amalric of Lusignan, Lord of Tyre, son of King Hugh III of Cyprus.
11. Constantine I (b. 11 January 1277/10 January 1278 – d. aft. 1308), King of Armenia (ruled 1299).
12. Rita (b. 11 January 1278/10 January 1279 – July 1333), renamed Maria upon her wedding; married in 1294 with Michael IX Palaeologus, co-Emperor of the Byzantine Empire with his father Andronicus II Palaeologus.
13. Theophanu (b. 11 January 1278/10 January 1279 – d. 1296), twin with Rita; renamed Theodora upon her betrothal; she died en route to marry Theodore, son of John I Doukas, Lord of Thessaly.
14. Nerses (b. 11 January 1279/10 Jan 1280 – d. 26 May 1301), a priest.
15. Oshin (b. 10 January 1283/9 January 1284 – murdered 20 July 1320), King of Armenia (ruled 1308 to 1320).
16. Alinakh (b. 10 January 1283/9 January 1284 – d. 28 August 1310), twin with Oshin; Lord of Lampron and Tarsus.

== Notes ==
Leo II, King of Armenia House of Lambron Born: c. 1236 Died: 1289
Regnal titles
Preceded by Hetoum I	King of Armenia; 1270–1289	Succeeded by Hetoum II
