= Battle of Mari =

1266 battle in Mari

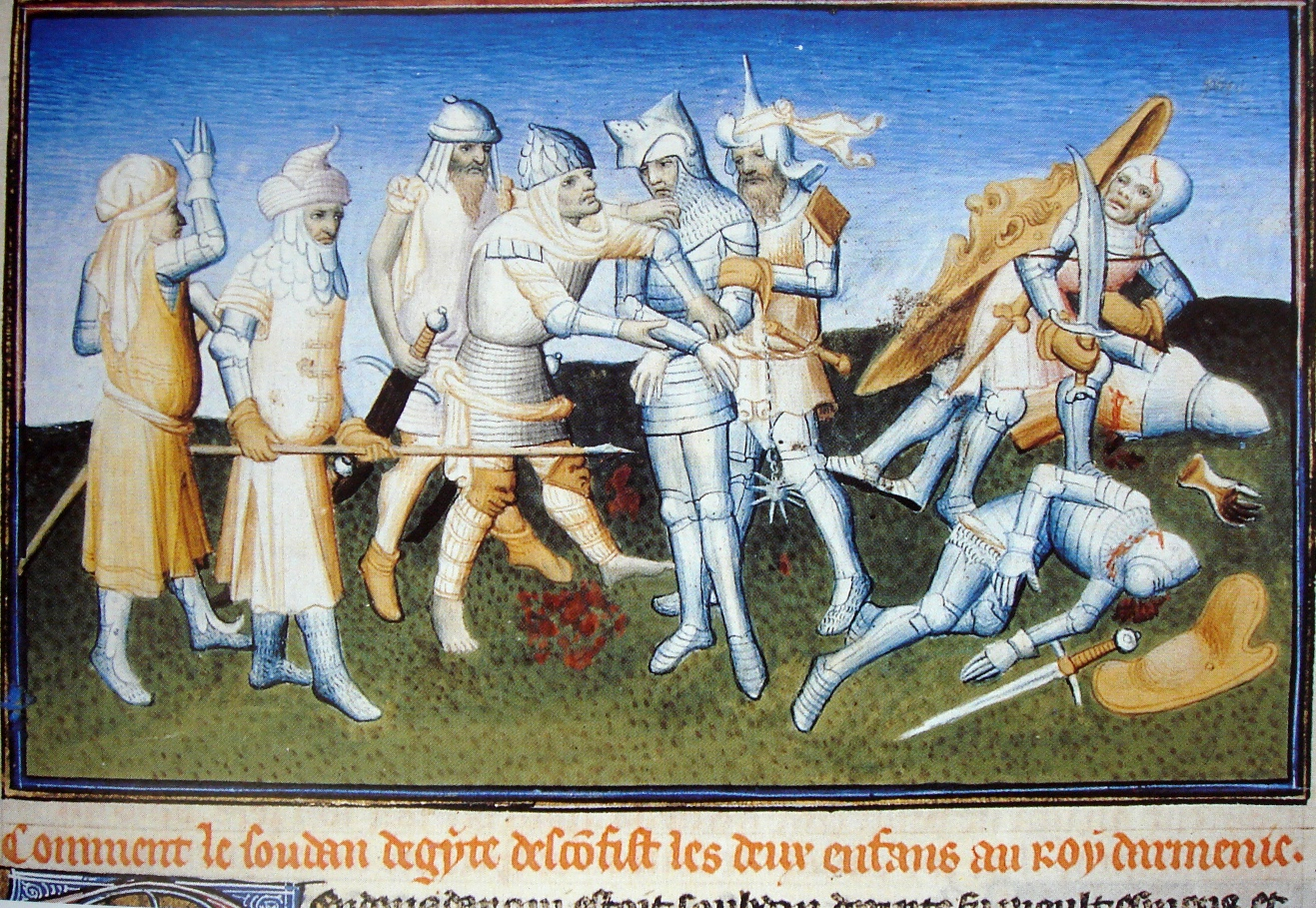
- The Mamluks killed one of Hetoum I's sons (fallen, right) and captured another (the future king Leo II, middle).
Date	24 August 1266
Location	Mari, near Darbsak
Result	Mamluk victory

Belligerents
Armenian Kingdom of Cilicia	Mamluk Sultanate of Egypt

Commanders and leaders
Leo II (POW); Thoros, son of Hetoum I †	Baybars; Al-Mansur Ali; Al-Mansur Qalawun

Casualties and losses
Heavy casualties, thousands of Armenians were massacred and 40,000 enslaved	Unknown

The Battle of Mari, also called the Disaster of Mari, was a battle between the Egyptians of the Mamluk Sultanate and the Armenians of Cilician Armenia on 24 August 1266.

== Battle ==
The conflict started when the Mamluk Sultan Baybars, seeking to take advantage of the weakened Mongol domination, sent an army to Cilicia and demanded that Hethum I of Armenia abandon his allegiance to the Mongols, accept himself as a suzerain, and give to the Mamluks the territories and fortresses Hetoum had acquired through his alliance with the Mongols. At the time however, Hetoum I was in Tabriz, having gone to the Mongol court of the Il-Khan in Persia to obtain military support. During his absence, the Mamluks marched on Cilician Armenia, led by Al-Mansur Ali and the Mamluk commander Qalawun.

Hetoum I's two sons, Leo (the future king Leo II) and Thoros, led the defense by strongly manning the fortresses at the entrance of the Cilician territory. The confrontation took place at Mari, near Darbsakon on 24 August 1266, where the heavily outnumbered Armenians were unable to resist the much better Mamluk forces. Thoros was killed in battle, and Leo was captured and imprisoned. The Armeno-Mongol son of the Constable Sempad, named Vasil Tatar, was also taken prisoner by the Mamluks and was taken into captivity with Leo, although they are reported to have been treated well.

== Aftermath ==
Following their victory, the Mamluks invaded Cilicia, ravaging the three great cities of the Cilician plain: Mamistra, Adana and Tarsus, as well as the harbour of Ayas. Another group of Mamluks under Mansur took the capital of Sis. The pillage lasted 20 days, during which thousands of Armenians were massacred and 40,000 were taken captive.

When Hetoum I arrived with Mongol troops, the country was already devastated. Hetoum I had to negotiate the return of his son Leo by giving control of Armenia's border fortresses to the Mamluks. In 1269, Hetoum I abdicated in favour of his son, and became a monk, but died a year later. Leo was left in the awkward situation of keeping Cilicia as a subject of the Mongol Empire, while paying tribute to the Mamluks at the same time.
