= Sarvanlar, Aghjabadi =

Sarvanlar
- Municipality
- Location within Azerbaijan Location within Karabakh Economic Region
- Coordinates: 39°59′47″N 47°09′28″E
- Country: Azerbaijan
- Rayon: Aghjabadi

Population
  - Total: 522
- Time zone: UTC+4 (AZT)
  - Summer (DST): UTC+5 (AZT)

Sarvanlar is a village and municipality in the Aghjabadi Rayon of Azerbaijan. It has a population of 522.
