= Smbat I Hetumian =

King of Armenian Cilicia from 1296 to 1298

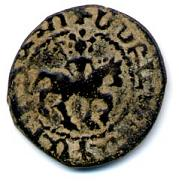
A coin of Smbat. Legend: ՍՄԲԱ[Տ ԹԱԳԱԻՈՐ ՀԱՅՈՑ] (Smbat, king of the Armenians).

Smbat (Armenian: Սմբատ; 1277 – c. 1310) was king of the Armenian Kingdom of Cilicia, ruling from 1296 to 1298. He was the son of Leo II of Armenia and Kyranna de Lampron and was part of the Hetoumid-family.

Sempad seized the throne with the aid of his brother Constantine while his brothers Hethum II and Thoros were in the Byzantine capital Constantinople. In 1297, on a volitional journey to the Ghazan's court, Sempad managed to receive recognition of his position as king from the Mongol ruler of Persia, which was necessary to legitimate his usurpation. He also received a bride from the Mongol khan in order to form a matrimonial alliance, perhaps a relative of the khan himself.

On Hethum's return, Sempad had Hethum blinded by cauterization and both brothers imprisoned at Partzerpert. Thoros was murdered there on Sempad's orders in 1298, but Constantine turned traitor again and helped Hethum overthrow Sempad, assuming the throne while Hethum's blindness healed. Sempad again plotted with Constantine to resume the throne soon after Hethum's restoration, and both were imprisoned for the rest of their lives.

== Notes ==
Smbat I Hetumian House of Lambron
Regnal titles
Preceded by Hetoum II	King of Armenia; 1296–1298	Succeeded by Gosdantin I
