= Bilarghu =

Bilarghu, also Pilargh'ou, was a Mongol general of the ruler Ghazan during the end of the 13th and the beginning of the 14th century.

During the Mongol campaigns of 1299 in Syria, Bilarghu was put in charge of the rear-guard on the Euphrates, in command of 10,000 men.

In 1303, following the Mongol defeat against the Mamluks at the Battle of Shaqhab, Ghazan supplied 1,000 Mongols under Bilarghu to protect Cilician Armenia against Mamluk incursions.

In 1307, Bilarghu, who already had poor relations with Hethum II, was involved in an internal plot leading to his assassination of the Armenian rulers. Hetoum II and Leon III had been advocating and organizing the fusion of the Church of Armenia and the Catholic Church, but had been under terrible internal opposition. The opposing faction went to see Bilarghu, and accused Hetoum of plotting an insurrection against the Mongols. On November 17, Bilarghu decided to have them executed with their retinue when they visited him at Anazarbus for a banquet.

Oshin, brother of Hetoum, immediately marched against Bilarghu and vanquished him, forcing him to leave Cilicia. Oshin was crowned new king of the kingdom of Cilician Armenia.

Bilargu was executed by Oljeitu for his crime at the request of the Armenians.

== See also ==
- Armeno-Mongol alliance
