= Hethum I =

King of Armenian Cilicia from 1226 to 1270

Hethum I Հեթում Ա
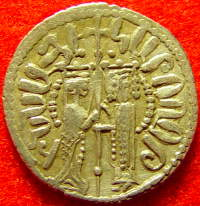
- Hethum I with Queen Isabella on a coin

King of the Armenian Kingdom of Cilicia
- Reign: 1226 – 1270
- Predecessor: Isabella
- Successor: Leo II
- Co-ruler: Isabella (1226–1252)
- Born: 1213
- Died: 21 October 1270 (aged 56–57)
- Spouse: Isabella
- Issue: Euphemia; Maria; Sybille; Rita; Leo II; Thoros
- Dynasty: House of Lampron
- Father: Constantine of Baberon
- Mother: Princess Alix Pahlavouni of Lampron

Hethum I (Armenian: Հեթում Ա; 1213 – 21 October 1270) ruled the Armenian Kingdom of Cilicia (also known as "Little Armenia") from 1226 to 1270. He was the son of Constantine of Baberon (d. 1263) and Princess Alix Pahlavouni of Lampron (a third-cousin of Leo I) and was the founder of the dynasty which bears his name: the Hethumids also known as the House of Lampron. Having accepted the suzerainty of the Mongol Empire, Hethum himself traveled to the Mongol court in Karakorum, Mongolia, a famous account of which is given by Hethum's companion, the historian Kirakos Gandzaketsi, in his History of Armenia. He allied with the Mongols to fight against the Muslim Mamluks and also encouraged other Crusader states to do the same.

== Family ==
Hethum's father Constantine had been regent for the young Isabella, Queen of Armenia. Isabella originally married Philip (1222–1225), son of Bohemond IV of Antioch. However, Constantine had Philip disposed of, and instead forced Isabella to marry his own son, Hethum, on June 14, 1226, to make Isabella and Hethum co-rulers. The couple had six children:

1. Leo II (died 1289)
2. Thoros (died at the Battle of Mari in 1266 fighting the Mamluks) - Thoros had one child: Melkum.
3. Sibylla (died 1290), who married Bohemond VI of Antioch
4. Euphemie (died 1309), who married to Julian Grenier, Lord of Sidon
5. Rita of Armenia, married Constantine of Servantikar
6. Maria, who married Guy of Ibelin, son of Baldwin of Ibelin, Seneschal of Cyprus
7. Rouben
8. Vasak.

== Armenian-Mongol relations ==
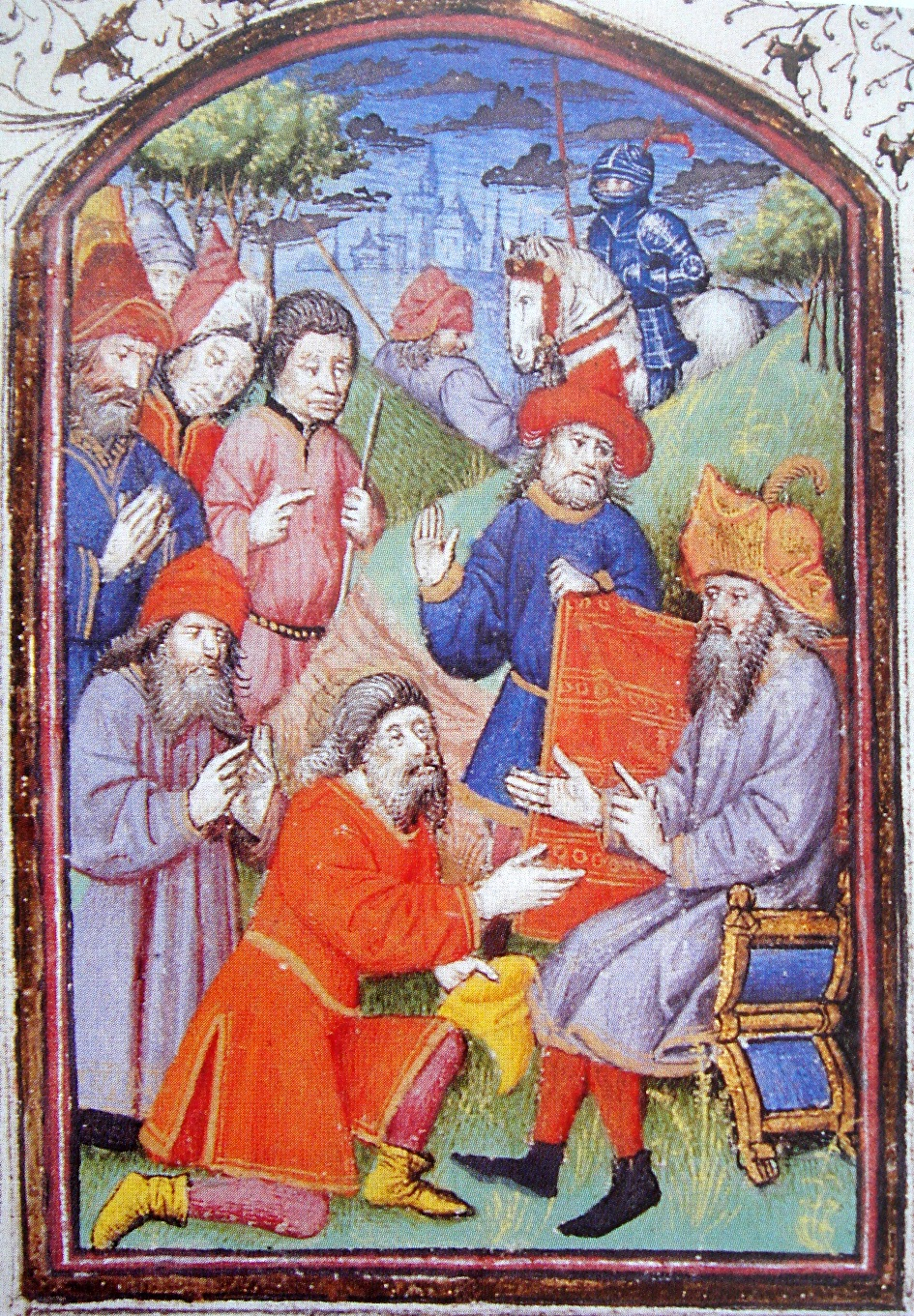
Hethum I (seated) in the Mongol court of Karakorum, "receiving the homage of the Mongols". Miniature from "Histoire des Tartars", Hayton of Corycus, 1307.

Hethum was a major player in the political struggles and shifting alliances around the Crusader states, as the Armenians had ties with all sides. They were primarily aligned with the Europeans, but during Hethum's reign, the rapidly expanding Mongol Empire became a concern. When the Mongol commander Baiju attacked the Sultanate of Rum, the Seljuq sultan Kaykhusraw II called on Hethum to come to his aid. Faced with internal disagreements about the war and likely sensing that the Mongols were the greater threat, Hethum delayed and Kaykhusraw's army left without the Armenians. After the Mongols inflicted a crushing defeat on the Seljuqs at Kösedağ and approached the borders of Cappadocia and Cilicia, King Hethum made a strategic decision to submit to Mongol suzerainty. He sent his brother Sempad to the Mongol court in Karakorum. There, Sempad met Great Khan Güyük, and made a formal agreement in 1247 in which Cilician Armenia would be considered a vassal state of the Mongol Empire.

In 1245, Cilicia was attacked by the Sultanate of Rum, prompted by Hethum's decision to hand over Sultan Kaykhusraw's wife and daughter (who had found refuge at his court after Kösedağ) to Baiju. The Seljuks were aided by Hethum's disloyal vassal, Constantine of Lampron. Kaykhusraw was only able to seize a few forts which the Mongols forced him to return a few years later, while Constantine was captured and executed in 1250.

In 1254, Hethum himself traveled through Central Asia to Mongolia to renew the agreement, passing through the Turkish states of eastern Asia Minor, the Mongol camp at Kars in Greater Armenia, the Iron Gates of Derbent at the western shore of the Caspian Sea, and from there across Asia to Karakorum. He brought many sumptuous presents, and met with Möngke Khan (Güyük's cousin). An account of his travels was recorded by a member of his suite, Kirakos Gandzaketsi as "Travels of Haithon, the Pious King of the Armenians, to Batu and Mangu Khans", the 58th chapter of Gandzaketsi's History of Armenia. The Journey of Hethoum was later translated into Russian, French, English, and Chinese. The narrative is important for its observations of Mongol, Buddhist, and Chinese culture, geography, and wildlife.

On his way back from Karakorum, Hethum passed through Samarkand and northern Persia, also visiting the Mongol leader Baiju, where he was present in his camp to witness Baiju's victory in Asia Minor against the Seljuq Turks.

Hethum strongly encouraged other Frankish rulers to follow his example and submit to Mongol suzerainty, but the only one who did so was Hethum's son-in-law, Bohemond VI of Antioch, who submitted around 1259. Armenian troops were with the Mongol army that captured Baghdad in 1258, and both Armenians and Antiochenes Crusaders fought in the Mongol Army under Hulagu at the Siege of Aleppo and Fall of Damascus in 1260. Historical accounts, quoting from the writings of the medieval historian Templar of Tyre, often give a dramatic account of the three Christian rulers (Hethum, Bohemond, and the Mongol general Kitbuqa) entering the city of Damascus together in triumph, though modern historians have questioned this story as apocryphal.

Despite the Mongols' territorial gains, in September 1260, the Egyptian Mamluks rallied, defeating the Mongols at the historic Battle of Ain Jalut and driving them back across the Euphrates River. The Mongols would not again capture Syria until 1299–1300, when again they would hold it only for a few months.

== Retirement ==
During the last years of Hethum's reign, largely as a result of Hethum's active support of the Mongols, the kingdom came under increasing attack by the Mamluks under Baybars, who invaded in 1266. The heavily outnumbered Armenians were unable to hold off the Mamluks at the Disaster of Mari, during which one of Hethum's sons, Thoros, was killed and another son, Leo, was captured and imprisoned. Following this defeat, the cities of Adana, Tarsus, and Ayas were assaulted and the capital of Sis was sacked and burnt. Thousands of Armenians were massacred and 40,000 taken captive. Hethum was able to ransom his son by conceding territory to the Egyptians. In May 1268, the allied Principality of Antioch was overrun by the Egyptians who, under Baybars, captured it and massacred its inhabitants and destroyed all its churches.

Hethum abdicated in 1270 in favor of his son Leo, and lived out the rest of his life in a monastery, as a monk.

== Notes ==
Hethum I House of Lambron
Regnal titles
Preceded by Isabella	King of Armenia; 1226–1270	Succeeded by Leo II
