= Sis, Armenia =

Village in Ararat, Armenia

Sis Սիս
- Location within Armenia Location within Ararat
- Coordinates: 40°03′31″N 44°23′11″E
- Country: Armenia
- Province: Ararat
- Municipality: Masis

Area
  - Total: 6.2 km^{2} (2.4 sq mi)

Population (2011)
  - Total: 1,201
- Time zone: UTC+4
  - Summer (DST): UTC+5

Sis Village Entrance

Sis (Armenian: Սիս) is a village in the Masis Municipality of the Ararat Province of Armenia.
