= Battle of Mamistra =

Date	1152
Location	Mamistra, Cilician Armenia
Result	Armenian victory

Belligerents
Armenian Kingdom of Cilicia	Byzantine Empire

Commanders and leaders
Thoros II; Mleh; Stephen	Manuel I Komnenos; Andronikos Komnenos

Strength
7,500	12,000

Casualties and losses
Light	Heavy

The Battle of Mamistra (Armenian: Մամեստիայի ճակատամարտ, romanized: Mamestiayi Tschakatamart) took place in 1152 between the forces the Byzantine Empire and Cilician Armenia, near the city of Mamistra. The Armenians under Thoros II were victorious.

== Background ==
Byzantine Emperor Manuel I Komnenos sent his troops in order to expand the empire. 12,000 troops under Andronikos Komnenos traveled to Cilicia. Many Armenian noblemen from Western Cilicia left Thoros' control and joined the Byzantine troops. Andronikos rejected Thoros' offer of a truce, vowing that he would destroy the Armenian kingdom and imprison Thoros the same way as the Byzantines had done to Levon I, Thoros' father. The Byzantines besieged the Armenians.

== Battle ==
Byzantine writer Niketas Choniates and the Armenian writer Grigor Erets claim that the Armenian troops, under the leadership of Thoros and his brothers, Stephen and Mleh, launched a surprise attack from the besieged city during a rainy night and defeated the Byzantines. Andronikos left his army and went to Antioch.

Niketas Choniates claims that the Armenian soldiers were braver and more skilled than those of the Byzantine army. The Byzantines had to ransom their captured soldiers and generals. Surprisingly, Thoros gave the reward to his soldiers. Most of the Armenian noblemen who joined the Byzantine troops were killed during the battle.

== Aftermath ==
The battle had a large impact on the independence of Armenian Cilicia, as the battle strengthened the position of the Armenians in Cilicia and created realistic opportunities for the creation of a new, formally and factually independent Armenian state in Cilicia.
