= List of monarchs of the Armenian Kingdom of Cilicia =

The Armenian Kingdom of Cilicia and the surrounding area

The Armenian Kingdom of Cilicia was a state formed in the Middle Ages by Armenian refugees, who were fleeing the Seljuk invasion of Armenia. It was initially founded by the Rubenian dynasty, an offshoot of the larger Bagratid family that at various times held the thrones of Armenia and Georgia. While the Rubenian rulers were initially regional princes, their close ties with the Western world after the First Crusade saw the principality recognised as a kingdom under Leo I by the Holy Roman Empire in 1198. The Rubenid dynasty fell in 1252 after the death of the last Rubenid monarch Isabella, and her husband Hethum I became sole ruler, beginning the Hethumid dynasty. After the death of Leo IV in 1341 his cousin was elected to succeed him as Constantine II, the first king of the Lusignan dynasty. The kingdom fell at the beginning of Leo V's reign to the Mamluks, and henceforth title holders were only claimants to the throne. Charlotte of Cyprus ceded the throne to the House of Savoy in 1485, and the title fell out of use until after 1861.

== Lords/princes ==
Name	Lifespan	Reign start	Reign end	Notes	Family	Image
Ruben I		1080	1095		Rubenids	
Constantine I		1095	1102		Rubenids	
Thoros I		1102	1129		Rubenids	
Constantine II		1129	1129		Rubenids	
Leo I		1129	1140		Rubenids	
Thoros II		1144	1169		Rubenids	
Ruben II		1169	1170		Rubenids	
Mleh		1170	1175		Rubenids	
Ruben III		1175	1187		Rubenids	
Leo II		1187	1198/1199	Became first king as Leo I	Rubenids	

== Kings and queens ==
Name	Lifespan	Reign start	Reign end	Notes	Family	Image
Leo I (II)		1198/1199	1219		Rubenids	
Isabella		1219	1252	Queen regnant, and co-ruler with Philip and Hethum I	Rubenids	Isabella with King Hethum on a coin
Philip		1222	1225	Co-ruler with Isabella	House of Poitiers	
Hethum I		1226	1270	Co-ruler with Isabella until 1252	Hethumids	Hethoum at the court of the Mongols
Leo II (III)		1270	1289		Hethumids	
Hethum II		1289	1293	Abdicated in favour of Thoros III	Hethumids	Hethoum II in Franciscan garb
Thoros III		1293	1298	Recalled Hethoum II, with whom he became co-ruler	Hethumids	
Hethum II		1295	1296	Co-ruler with Thoros III	Hethumids	Hethoum II in Franciscan garb
Sempad		1296	1298	Usurper	Hethumids	
Constantine I (III)		1298	1299		Hethumids	
Hethum II		1299	1303	Reclaimed throne. Abdicated and became regent for Leo III	Hethumids	Hethoum II in Franciscan garb
Leo III (IV)		1303	1307	Under regency of Hethum II	Hethumids	
Oshin		1307	1320		Hethumids	
Leo IV (V)		1320	1341	Under regency of Oshin of Korikos until 1329	Hethumids	Leo IV dispensing justice
Constantine II (IV)		1342	1344	Elected by nobles	House of Lusignan	
Constantine III (V)		1344	1362		House of Neghir	
Constantine IV (VI)		1362	1373		House of Neghir	
Leo V (VI)		1374	1375		House of Lusignan	

== Claimants ==
Name	Lifespan	Reign start	Reign end	Notes	Family	Image
Leo V		1375	1393		Lusignan	
James I		1393	1398		Lusignan	
Janus		1398	1432		Lusignan	
John		1432	1458		Lusignan	
Charlotte		1458	1467		Lusignan	

=== Potential claimants today ===
The claim to the title passed to the House of Savoy, who were granted it by Charlotte in 1485. The Savoyard dynasts maintained their claim to the title "King of Cyprus, Jerusalem and Armenia" as late as the 20th century.

In 1880, a former Maronite priest Kalfa Narbei declared that he was a descendant of Guy de Lusignan and styled himself as the Prince of Lusignan of Cyprus, of Jerusalem and of Armenia. He took the name Guy de Lusignan and title of Prince. He started offering self-styled chivalric orders. After the death of Guy/Kalfa Narbei in 1905, his wife Marie's lover became the alleged Grand Master and called himself Comte d'Alby de Gratigny. He became involved in a fake art scandal in 1910.
