= Constantine II, Prince of Armenia =

Lord of Armenian Cilicia in c. 1129

Constantine II Կոստանդին Բ
- Lord of Cilicia

Lord of Armenian Cilicia
- Reign: 1129/1130
- Predecessor: Thoros I
- Successor: Leo I
- Died: after February 17, 1129
- House: Roupenians
- Father: Thoros I

Constantine II (Armenian: Կոստանդին Բ), also Kostandin II, (unknown – after February 17, 1129) was the fourth lord of Armenian Cilicia (1129/1130).

The Chronique Rimée de la Petite Arménie (“The Rhymed Chronicle of Armenia Minor”) of Vahram of Edessa records that he was the son of Thoros I, lord of Armenian Cilicia. His mother's name is not known.

He and his father's deaths occurred during 1129.

After the death of Thoros, his only son and heir was cast into prison by some wicked people, who administered to him a poisonous drug, thus the principality came to Leon, the brother of Thoros (…).

— Vahram of Edessa: The Rhymed Chronicle of Armenia Minor

Other historians (e.g., Jacob G. Ghazarian, Vahan M. Kurkjian) suggest that there were no successors for Toros. and was succeeded by Leon I.

== Sources ==
- Ghazarian, Jacob G: The Armenian Kingdom in Cilicia during the Crusades: The Integration of Cilician Armenians with the Latins (1080–1393); RoutledgeCurzon (Taylor & Francis Group), 2000, Abingdon; ISBN 0-7007-1418-9
- Runciman, Steven (1952). A History of the Crusades, Volume II: The Kingdom of Jerusalem and the Frankish East. Vol. 2. Cambridge: Cambridge University Press.

Constantine II, Prince of Armenia House of Roupen
Regnal titles
Preceded by Thoros I	Lord of Armenian Cilicia; 1129/1130	Succeeded by Leo I
