= Zovk =

Zovk Զովք
- Location within Armenia
- Coordinates: 40°12′22″N 44°41′37″E
- Country: Armenia
- Marz (Province): Kotayk
- Elevation: 1,650 m (5,410 ft)

Population (2011)
  - Total: 901
- Time zone: UTC+4 ( )

Zovk (Armenian: Զովք), is a village in the Kotayk Province of Armenia.

== See also ==
- Kotayk Province
- Siege of Zovk
