= Leo I of Armenia =

Leo I of Armenia may refer to:

- Leo I, Prince of Armenia, who ruled 1129/1130–1137
- Leo I, King of Armenia, who ruled 1198/1199–1219
