= Ruben II =

Roupen II Ռուբեն Բ
- Lord of Cilicia
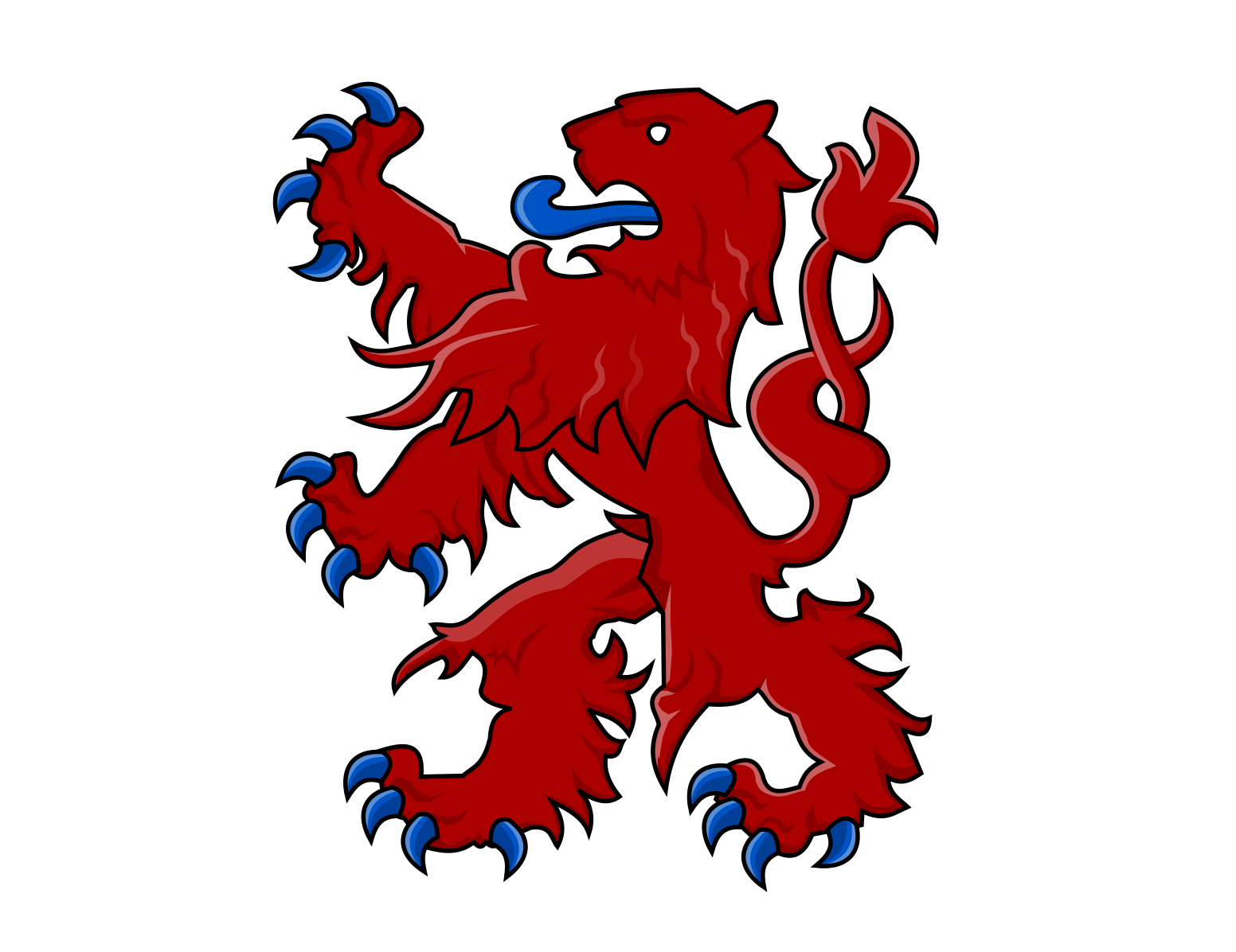
- Flag of the Armenian Rupenid Dynasty

Lord of Armenian Cilicia
- Reign: 1169–1170
- Predecessor: Thoros II
- Successor: Mleh I
- Born: c. 1165
- Died: 1170; Hromgla
- House: Roupenians
- Father: Thoros II
- Mother: An unnamed daughter of Regent Thomas

Ruben II (Armenian: Ռուբեն Բ), also Roupen II or Rupen II, (c. 1165–1170) was the seventh lord of Armenian Cilicia (1169–1170).

Roupen was the son of Thoros II, lord of Armenian Cilicia, by his second wife (and great niece) whose name is unknown. (Thomas was the child’s maternal grandfather). However, Thoros II’s brother, Mleh disputed the succession; Mleh had fled to Nur ad-Din (the emir of Aleppo) and become a Muslim after quarreling with Thoros II and attempting to assassinate him.

Thoros left a child under age, whom he committed, together with the country, to the care of a certain Baron and Baillie Thomas, his father-in-law, with an injunction to deliver to him the country as soon as the child should have attained his majority. Mleh (…) was with the Sultan of Aleppo, and hearing of the death of his brother he came with an army into the country, and dealt very cruelly with its inhabitants. Not being able to conquer the possessions of his brother he returned to Aleppo, and came back with still greater forces. Receiving a message from the Armenian Barons that they would freely acknowledge him as their sovereign, he sent back the Turks, and governed in peace for some time. But he soon drove into exile the Baillie Thomas, who went afterwards to Antioch. The child of Thoros was killed by the command of Mleh by some wicked people.

— Smbat Sparapet: Chronicle

== Sources ==
- Ghazarian, Jacob G: The Armenian Kingdom in Cilicia during the Crusades: The Integration of Cilician Armenians with the Latins (1080–1393); RoutledgeCurzon (Taylor & Francis Group), 2000, Abingdon; ISBN 0-7007-1418-9
- Runciman, Steven (1952). A History of the Crusades, Volume II: The Kingdom of Jerusalem and the Frankish East. Cambridge: Cambridge University Press.

Ruben II House of Roupen
Regnal titles
| Preceded by Thoros II | Lord of Armenian Cilicia; 1169–1170 | Succeeded by Mleh I |
