= Thoros I =

Lord of Armenian Cilicia from c. 1100 to c. 1129

Toros I Թորոս Ա

Lord of Armenian Cilicia
- Reign: c. 1100 – 1129/1130
- Predecessor: Constantine I
- Successor: Constantine II
- Born: 1070/71
- Died: 1129 / February 17, 1129 – February 16, 1130
- Burial: Monastery of Drazark
- Issue: Constantine II (?) Oshin
- House: Roupenians
- Father: Constantine I
- Mother: An unnamed great-granddaughter of Bardas Phokas

Toros I (Armenian: Թորոս Ա), also Thoros I, (unknown – 1129 / February 17, 1129 – February 16, 1130) was the third lord of Armenian Cilicia (c. 1100 / 1102 / 1103 – 1129 / 1130).

== His life ==
Toros was the elder son of Constantine I, lord of Armenian Cilicia.

In 1107, encouraged by Tancred, Prince of Antioch, Toros followed the course of the Pyramus River (today the river Ceyhan in Turkey), and seized the strongholds of Anazarbus (a place which had been considered impregnable) and Sis (ancient city). Toros extensively rebuilt the fortifications at both fortresses with tall circuit walls and massive round towers. A dedicatory inscription on the church (dated ca. A.D.1111) records his triumph and traces his Rubenid genealogy.

In 1111, Sultan Malik Shah of Konya entered Armenian territories. Levon saved the Armenian Kingdom of Cilicia into falling in the hands of the Turks.

His death occurred during 1129.

== Marriage and children ==
The name of Toros's wife is not known.

- Constantine II of Cilicia (? – after February 17, 1129)
- (?) Oshin (? – after February 17, 1129)

== See also ==
- Siege of Zovk

== Sources ==
- Edwards, Robert W.: The Fortifications of Armenian Cilicia: Dumbarton Oaks Studies XXIII; Dumbarton Oaks, Trustees for Harvard University, 1987, Washington, D.C.; ISBN 0-88402-163-7
- Edwards, Robert W.: “Ecclesiastical Architecture in the Fortifications of Armenian Cilicia: First Report,” Dumbarton Oaks Papers vol. 36; Dumbarton Oaks, Trustees for Harvard University, 1982, Washington, D.C.; ISBN 0-88402-114-9
- Edwards, Robert W.: “Ecclesiastical Architecture in the Fortifications of Armenian Cilicia: Second Report,” Dumbarton Oaks Papers vol. 37; Dumbarton Oaks, Trustees for Harvard University, 1983, Washington, D.C.; ISBN 0-88402-121-1
- Ghazarian, Jacob G. (2018). The Armenian Kingdom in Cilicia during the Crusades: The Integration of Cilician Armenians with the Latins (1080–1093). Taylor & Francis.
- Runciman, Steven (1952). A History of the Crusades, Volume II: The Kingdom of Jerusalem and the Frankish East. Vol. 2. Cambridge: Cambridge University Press.

Thoros I House of Roupen
Regnal titles
Preceded by Constantine I	Lord of Armenian Cilicia c. 1100/1102/1103–1129/1130	Succeeded by Constantine II
