= 1269 Cilicia earthquake =

Earthquake in Turkey

- Location within Turkey
- Local date: 14 May 1269
- Local time: First hour of the night
- Magnitude: M_{w} 7.22±0.46
- Epicenter: 36.936°N 36.265°E
- Areas affected: Armenian Kingdom of Cilicia, Ilkhanate, Principality of Antioch (Modern Turkey, Northwest Syria)
- Max. intensity: MMI VIII (Severe)
- Casualties: 8,000 or over 60,000 dead (est.)

An earthquake occurred northeast of the city of Adana in the Armenian Kingdom of Cilicia (modern day Turkey) on 14 May 1269 at "the first hour of the night". Most sources give a death toll of 8,000 in the Armenian Kingdom of Cilicia in southern Asia Minor, but a figure of 60,000 dead was reported by Robert Mallet in 1853 and repeated in many later catalogues.

== Tectonic setting ==
The area occupied by the Armenian Kingdom of Cilicia lies close to the boundaries between three tectonic plates, the Arabian plate, the African plate and the Anatolian plate. The movement between these plates is taken up by large fault zones, particularly the Dead Sea Transform and the East Anatolian Fault. At its southwestern end, the East Anatolian Fault (EAF) splits into two main branches, both of which link through to the Cyprus Arc. The northern branch of the EAF itself branches into several segments, some of which, such as the Toprakkale Fault and Düziçi–İskenderun Fault Zone, cross the Çukurova Plain, close to the foot of the Nur Mountains.

== Earthquake ==
The Kandilli Observatory estimated the moment magnitude (M_{w}) at 7.22 ± 0.46. They placed the epicenter about 10 km south of Osmaniye. In the CFTI5MED Catalogue of strong earthquakes in Italy and in the Mediterranean area, the Istituto Nazionale di Geofisica e Vulcanologia (INGV) give a similar location for the epicenter but give a lower estimate for the magnitude of 6.4 M_{e} (a magnitude derived from seismic intensity, intended to be equivalent to M_{w}).

== Damage ==
Several contemporary sources report that the fortress of Sarvandikar was destroyed, killing those inside. Several castles were also ruined, including those at Delnk'ar, Hamus, Harunye and Hagar Suglan. The monastery of Ark'akalin (thought to be located near Sis) was severely damaged, leading to the deaths of priests and monks. Many villages were destroyed across Cilicia, particularly those at the foot of the Nur Mountains. About 8,000 people were said to have died.
