= Ruben I =

Lord of Armenian Cilicia from c. 1080 to 1095

Ruben I Ռուբեն Ա
- Lord of Cilicia

Lord of Armenian Cilicia
- Reign: c. 1080 – 1095
- Predecessor: (none)
- Successor: Constantine I
- Born: 1025; Armenia
- Died: 1095 (aged 69–70); Cilicia
- Burial: Monastery of Castalon
- Issue: Constantine I
- House: Rubenids

Ruben I, (Armenian: Ռուբեն Ա; 1025–1095) was the first lord of Armenian Cilicia from 1080 until his death.

The first movement of Armenian nobles immigrating to the Byzantine Empire began during the reign of Emperor Maurice, when Armenians voluntarily joined the Byzantine army. Mass Armenian immigration began when the Seljuks raided the Aras River, leaving the areas around Lake Van unprotected. In the 10th century, a large number of Armenian settlers settled in Cilicia.

== Life ==
Ruben was a descendant of the Bagratids. He went alongside the Armenian king Gagik II to Constantinople to sign an allegedly permanent peace-treaty upon the Byzantine emperor Constantine IX's request. However, Gagik was forced by the emperor to hand over his Armenian territory and live in exile. Gagik was later assassinated by the Byzantine governors of Kyzistra. After Gagik II was killed, his relatives and followers fled to the Taurus Mountains and found refuge in the castle of Kapitar, north of Kozan. The plateaus around the Taurus Mountains were very difficult to access, which allowed Ruben to easily organize a band of Armenian troops to revolt against the Byzantine Empire.

In 1079 Ruben's troops advanced south to Kozan and captured the city from the Empire. In 1080, the foundation of the independent Armenian princedom of Cilicia, and the future kingdom, was laid by many other Armenian lords and nobles united under Ruben's leadership. Through continuous military campaigns against the Byzantines, he managed to expand his territory to the entire plain of Cilicia, in one of which he captured the powerful Castle of Antirim and made it a military base for his family. His descendants are called Rubenids.

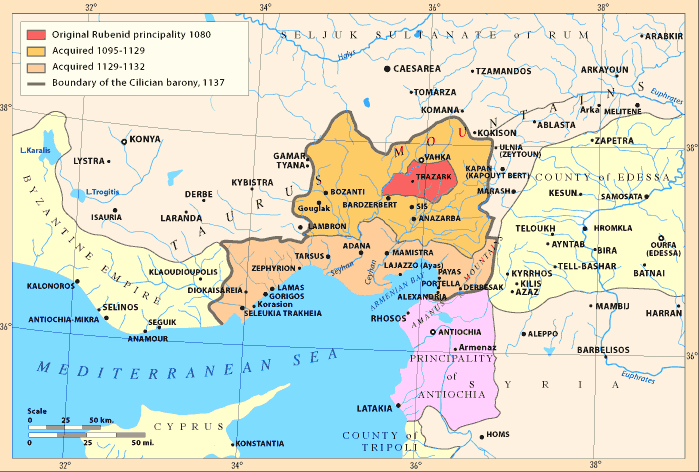
Rubenid initial territory marked in red

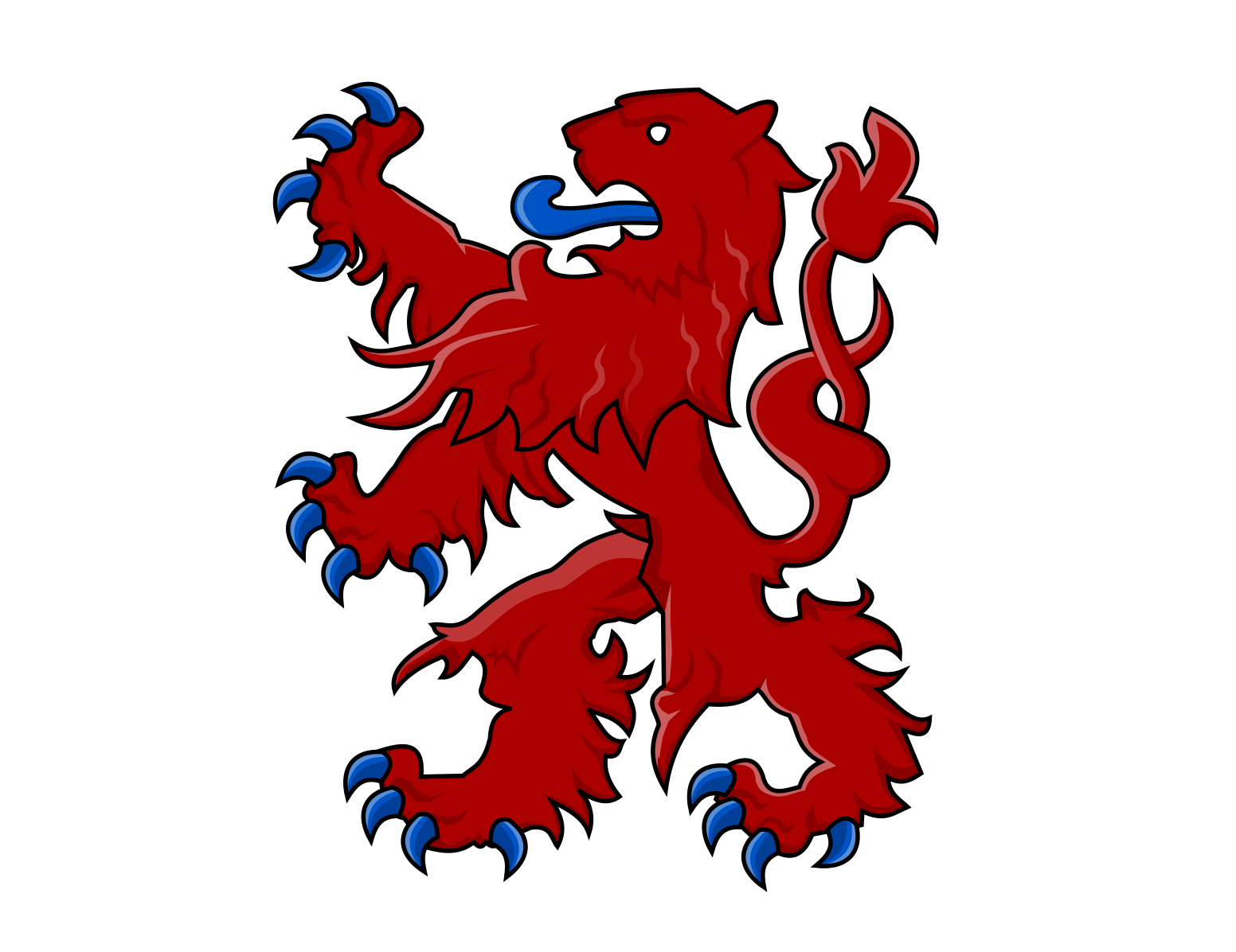
Coat of arms of the Rubenids

== Death ==
He was 70 when he died, buried at the monastery of Castalon.

== Marriage and children ==
The name of Roupen’s wife is unknown. His recorded children are:

- Constantine I of Cilicia (1035/1055 – 24 February 1102 / 23 February 1103)

== Bibliography ==
- Ghazarian, Jacob (2000). The Armenian Kingdom in Cilicia During the Crusades: The Integration of Cilician Armenians with the Latins, 1080-1393. Abingdon: RoutledgeCurzon. ISBN 9781136124181. OCLC 1079207547.

Ruben I House of Roupen
Regnal titles
New title	Lord of Armenian Cilicia; 1080/81/82–1095	Succeeded by Constantine I
