= Thoros II =

Lord of Armenian Cilicia from c. 1145 to 1169

Thoros II the Great Թորոս Բ Մեծ

Lord of Armenian Cilicia
- Reign: 1144/1145–1169
- Predecessor: Leo I (until 1137)
- Successor: Roupen II
- Died: February 6, 1169 (aged 58–59)
- Burial: Drazark monastery
- Issue Detail: Roupen II
- House: Roupenians
- Father: Leo I
- Religion: Armenian Apostolic

Thoros II (Armenian: Թորոս Բ; died 6 February 1169), also known as Thoros the Great, was the sixth lord of Armenian Cilicia from the Rubenid dynasty from 1144/1145 until 1169.

Thoros (together with his father, Leo I and his brother, Roupen) was kidnapped in 1137 by the Byzantine Emperor John II Comnenus during his campaign against Cilicia and the Principality of Antioch. All of Cilicia remained under Byzantine rule for eight years.

Whatever the conditions in which Thoros entered Cilicia, he found it occupied by many Greek garrisons.

Thoros was of a tall figure and of a strong mind: his compassion was universal; like the light of the sun he shone by his good works, and flourished by his faith; he was the shield of truth and the crown of righteousness; he was well versed in the Holy Scriptures and in the profane sciences. It is said that he was of such profound understanding, as to be able to explain the difficult expressions of the prophets – his explanations even still exist.

— Vahram of Edessa: The Rhymed Chronicle of Armenia Minor

== Early life ==
Thoros was the second son of Leo I, lord of Armenian Cilicia.

In 1136, Leo I (Thoros's father) was arrested by Baldwin of Marash. After two months of confinement, Leo I obtained his liberty by consenting to harsh terms.

Leo I took refuge in the Taurus Mountains, but at last found the situation hopeless, and surrendered himself to the conqueror; Thoros was kidnapped with his father and his youngest brother, Roupen. They were dragged away to Constantinople, where Leo I died in imprisonment in 1141. Roupen, after being blinded, was assassinated by the Greeks.

== Lord of Armenian Cilicia ==
=== The liberation of Armenian Cilicia ===
Leo died and was elevated to Christ; the emperor then felt compassion for Thoros, took him out of prison, and received him into the imperial guards. Being now in the imperial palace, and a soldier among the soldiers, he very soon distinguished himself, and even the emperor looked upon him with benevolence. Before the end of the year /1141/ the emperor left Constantinople with a large army, and went to assist the Prince of Antioch, who was hard pressed by the Turks. Being on a hunting party in the valley of Anazarbus, one of his own poisoned arrows wounded him, and he fell dead on the spot; he thus met with his deserved fate (…) The Greek army returned, but Thoros remained in the country; though the traditions concerning this fact are different. Some say, Thoros withdrew himself quite alone, went by sea from Antioch to Cilicia, and took possession of his dominions, finding means to gain at first the town of Amouda, and afterwards all the other places. But the emperor’s party say that Thoros, during the time the Greeks stayed in the country, lived with a lady who gave him a great sum of money; with these treasures he fled to the mountains, and discovered himself to a priest as the son of Leo, the true king of the country. The priest was exceedingly happy at these tidings, and Thoros hid himself under a shepherd’s disguise. There were many Armenians in this part of the country who, being barbarously treated by the Greeks, sighed for their former masters; to these men, as it is said, the priest imparted the joyful tidings; they instantly assembled and appointed Thoros their Baron; he gained possession of Vahka, and afterwards of many other places. Let this be as it may, it was certainly ordained by God that this man, who was carried away as a prisoner, should become the chief of the country of his forefathers, that he should take the government out of the hands of the Greeks, and destroy their armies.

— Vahram of Edessa: The Rhymed Chronicle of Armenia Minor

=== The first Byzantine attack against Cilicia ===
In the same year /1151/ Leo's son, Thoros, took Mamistra and Tel Hamdoun from the Romans and seized Duke Thomas. Duke Andronicus who was charged with protecting the land of the Cilicians by order of the Roman emperor, came to the city of Mamistra with 12,000 cavalry against Thoros. And he boasted, shouting out to Thoros: «Behold your father's iron chains. I will take you bound in them to Constantinople, like your father.» When valiant Thoros heard this, he was unable to bear the insult. Instead, placing his trust in God, he assembled his forces, breached Mamistra’s walls at night, and attacked /the Byzantine troops/ like a lion, putting them to the sword. Among those who died in the great battle before the city gates was Sempad, lord of Barbaron. Among those captured were the lord of Lampron, Oshin, the lord of Partzepert, Vasil, and the lord of Prakan, Tigran /all of whom were/ on the side of the emperor. /Thoros'/ troops seized and despoiled the weak Roman forces and then let them go.

— Smbat Sparapet: Chronicle

=== Wars with the Seljuks and Antioch ===
In the year 603 AE /1154/ once again the Byzantine emperor Manuel sought to stoke Masud and he sent him twice the amount of treasure as previously, saying: «Quench the burning of my heart toward the Armenian people, destroy their fortresses, and exterminate them.» So the sultan came to Anazarbus with many troops, but he was unable to accomplish anything. He sent one of his grandees, named Yaqub, to ravage the territory of Antioch. When they had crossed the gate, the Brothers /the Knights Templar/, as though sent by God, swooped upon them at that place and slaughtered all of them, including their chief. When those in the sultan’s army heard about this, they were horrified. This was not all, for the wrath of God was visited upon them. Their horses perished from tapax /diarrhea/ and they themselves turned to flight, brother not waiting to help brother, nor comrade, comrade. They hamstrung many of the horses and fled on foot through difficult, marshy places, as though they were persecuting themselves. For at that time Thoros was not in his country. Rather, he had gone to Tsets. When he returned and saw what had unfolded everyone thanked God, for they had been defeated without the use of weapons and without a physical battle.

— Smbat Sparapet: Chronicle

Other view is that after the battle Raynald was forced to return home, covered with humiliation; and later on, Thoros voluntarily surrendered to the brethren the fortresses in question, and the Knights in turn took oath "to assist the Armenians on all occasions where they needed help."

The Armenians attacked the few remaining Byzantine fortresses in Cilicia.

=== The sack of Cyprus ===
In the year 606 AE /1157/ Thoros' brother, Stephen, Leo's son, motivated by his wicked nature and without his brother Thoros' knowledge, arose with his brigade of troops and started to successfully retake /certain/ districts. He took Kokison and Berdus. Sultan Kilij Arslan and Thoros had friendly relations with each other and Stephen, as we said, took these /areas/ without Thoros' consent. Owing to this disturbance, Kilij Arslan came to the district of Kokison and pacified everyone, in no way blaming the inhabitants. Thence he went to Berdus, while Thoros, out of affection for the sultan, tricked his brother and surrendered Berdus to the sultan, against Stephen’s wishes. The sultan in turn, because of his affection for Thoros, freed the inhabitants of the fortress unharmed. Then Stephen attempted to steal Marash /today Kahramanmaraş in Turkey/, but could not. (…) Now it happened that Sultan Kilij Arslan had a genuine fondness for Thoros. He sent an emissary to Jerusalem and Antioch to Thoros, and again strengthened that friendship with an oath.

— Smbat Sparapet: Chronicle

== Last years ==
Now his brother, Mleh, was a malicious and treacherous man, and planned to kill his brother, Thoros. Getting together some others of the same tendency, one day while they had gone out to hunt deer, Mleh wanted to slay his brother there /at a place/ between Mamistra and Adana. But Thoros had been forewarned. He furiously seized Mleh and interrogated him before the troops and the princes as to what he was hoping to accomplish. They reproached Mleh in their presence and he was shamed. Then /Mleh/ gave /to T'oros/ much of the inventory of his authority, horses, mules, weapons, and treasures. And they removed him from his district. Thus he received nothing in exchange for his wickedness. So /Mleh/ arose and went to Nur ed-Din, lord of Aleppo, and entered into his service.

— Smbat Sparapet: Chronicle

After his abdication, he became a monk.

He died in 1169. He was buried in the monastery of Drazark.

== Marriages and children ==
1. c. 1149 An unnamed daughter of Simon of Raban (or, according to other views, Isabelle, daughter of Count Joscelin II of Edessa)
  - Rita (c. 1150 – after 1168/1169), the wife of Hethum III of Lampron
  - Irene, the wife of Isaac Komnenus of Cyprus
2. c. 1164 An unnamed daughter of the future regent Thomas
  - Roupen II of Cilicia (c. 1165 – Hromgla, 1170)

== In popular culture ==
Real-time strategy video game Age of Empires II: Definitive Edition contains a five-scenario campaign centered around Thoros II and his rule of Cilician Armenia.

== Sources ==
- Edwards, Robert W.: The Fortifications of Armenian Cilicia, Dumbarton Oaks Studies XXIII, Dumbarton Oaks: Trustees for Harvard University, 1987, Washington, D.C.; ISBN 0-88402-163-7
- Ghazarian, Jacob G.: The Armenian Kingdom in Cilicia during the Crusades: The Integration of Cilician Armenians with the Latins (1080–1393); RoutledgeCurzon (Taylor & Francis Group), 2000, Abingdon; ISBN 0-7007-1418-9
- Runciman, Steven (1952). A History of the Crusades, Volume II: The Kingdom of Jerusalem and the Frankish East. Vol. 2. Cambridge: Cambridge University Press.

Thoros II House of Roupen
Regnal titles
Preceded by Leo I (until 1137)	Lord of Armenian Cilicia; 1144/1145–1169	Succeeded by Roupen II
