= Fall of Sis =

Egyptian capture of the Armenian capital

Date	13 April 1375
Location	Sis near the modern town of Kozan, Adana Province, Turkey
Result	Mamluk victory

Belligerents
Cilician Armenia	Mamluk Sultanate

Commanders and leaders
(Armenian Kingdom of Cilicia) Leo V (POW)	Al-Ashraf Sha'ban

The fall of Sis or the siege of Sis was the capture of Sis and the destruction of the Armenian Kingdom of Cilicia by the Mamluk Sultanate. It occurred on 13 April 1375.

== Background ==
After Rumkale was conquered by Sultan al-Ashraf Khalil by in 1292, Sis became the Catholicos' residence. In 1266, the Egyptians looted and burnt the city following the Battle of Mari. In 1275, Sultan Baybars invaded Cilician Armenia, sacked its capital Sis (but not the citadel) and demolished the royal palace. A century later, in 1369 the Egyptians again conquered the city, but were forced to leave. Finally, in 1375 Sultan Al-Ashraf Sha'ban decided to conquer the Armenian Kingdom of Cilicia once and for all and annex it to the Egyptian Sultanate.

== Siege ==
The Egyptian forces moved from Cairo and met the Levantine forces in the city of Aleppo. Then they moved from Aleppo and conquered all the Armenian cities until the capital Sis fell to them and the King of Armenia, Leo V, was captured on 13 April 1375 alongside his wife and his family. He was sent as a prisoner to Cairo and was marched in a victory parade. The Armenian king and his family remained captive here for 5 years until the King of Castile paid a large ransom to free him and his family.

== Sources ==
- Dadoyan, Seta B. (2013). The Armenians in the Medieval Islamic World: Armenian Realpolitik in the Islamic World and Diverging Paradigmscase of Cilicia Eleventh to Fourteenth Centuries. Vol. 2. New Brunswick, New Jersey: Transaction Publishers. ISBN 978-1-4128-4782-7.
