= Isabella, Queen of Armenia =

Queen of Cilician Armenia from 1219 to 1252

Isabella Զապել
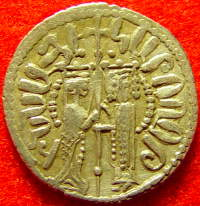
- Isabella and Hethum I on a coin

Queen of Armenian Cilicia
- Reign: 1219 – 1252
- Coronation: 14 May 1226
- Predecessor: Leo I
- Successor: Hethum I
- Regents: Adam of Baghras; Constantine of Baberon
- Co-rulers: Philip (1222–1225); Hethum I (1226–1252)
- Born: 1215
- Died: 23 January 1252; Ked
- Burial: Monastery of Trazarg
- Spouses: Philip of Antioch (m. 1222; died 1225) Hethum of Lampron (m. 1226)
- Issue among others...: Euphemia, Countess of Sidon; Sybilla, Princess of Antioch; Rita, Lady of Servantikar; Leo II, King of Armenia
- House: Roupenians
- Father: Leo I, King of Armenia
- Mother: Sibylla of Cyprus
- Religion: Armenian Apostolic

Isabella (Armenian: Զապել; 1215 – 23 January 1252), also Isabel or Zabel, was queen regnant of Armenian Cilicia from 1219 until her death in 1252. Under Constantine's regency, Isabella married Philip of Antioch. Philip's offensive behavior offended the Armenians who had him imprisoned and poisoned. Constantine then had Isabella marry his son Hethum. Isabella died 23 January 1252 and was buried in the monastery of Trazarg.

== Early years ==
Isabella was the only child of King Leo I by his second wife, Sibylla of Cyprus. She was betrothed to Andrew, but the betrothal did not occur.

King Leo I died on May, 1219. At this juncture, Raymond-Roupen, grandson of Roupen III, attempted to claim the throne of Cilicia for himself, but he was defeated, captured, and executed. Isabella was proclaimed queen, under the regency of Adam of Baghras. After Adam was assassinated, Constantine of Baberon was nominated as guardian. Regent Constantine arranged the marriage between Isabella and Philip in 1222. Philip, however, offended the Armenians' sensibilities, and even despoiled the royal palace, sending the royal crown to Antioch. The Armenians had him imprisoned at Sis and later poisoned.

== Wife of Hethum of Barbaron ==
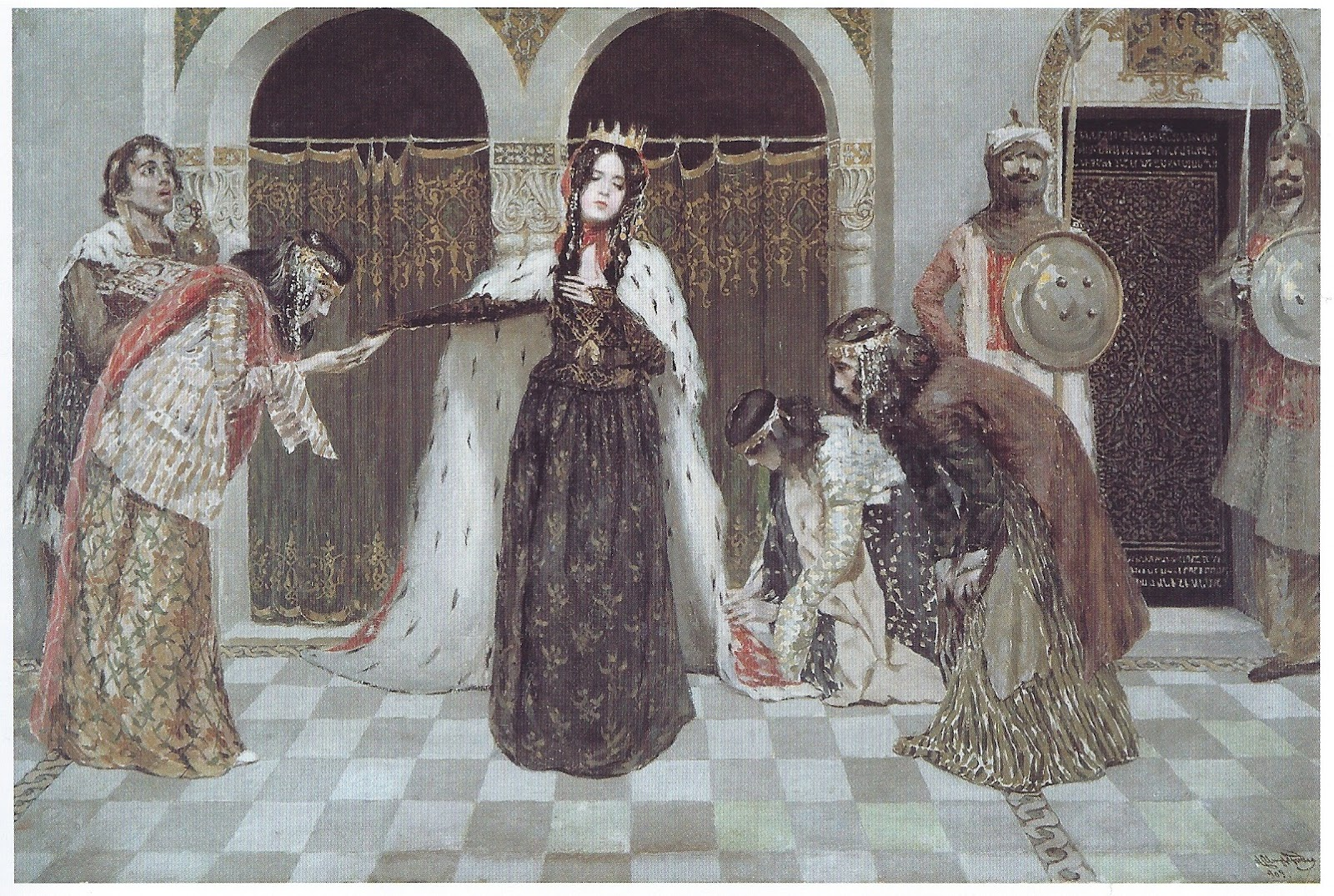
Queen Zabel's return to the throne, Vardges Sureniants, 1909

In 1226, Isabella married Hethum, son of Constantine, her regent. The marriage was legalized by Rome in 1237. There is evidence that Isabella shared a degree of royal power, for we learn from several sources that she co-signed with her husband an official deed transferring to the Knights of the Teutonic Order the strategic castle and town of Haronie. She was buried in the monastery of Trazarg.

== Marriages and children ==
Isabella married Philip of Antioch, who died in 1226.

Isabella later married Hethum I, king of Cilician Armenia. They had:

- Euphemia (? – 1309), the wife of Julian of Sidon (? – 12 January 1275/ 11 January 1276)
- Sybilla (? – 1290), the wife of Prince Bohemond VI of Antioch (c. 1237 – May/ 11 July 1275)
- Rita (? – ?), the wife of Constantine of Servantikar
- Leo II, king of Cilician Armenia ( 24 January 1236/ 23 January 1237 – 6 February 1289)
- Thoros (1244 – 24 August 1266)
- Isabella (? – c. 1268)
- Marie, who married Guy of Ibelin, son of Baldwin of Ibelin, Seneschal of Cyprus.

== Sources ==
- Der Nersessian, Sirarpie (1969) [1962]. "The Kingdom of Cilician Armenia". In Setton, Kenneth M.; Wolff, Robert Lee; Hazard, Harry W. (eds.). A History of the Crusades, Volume II: The Later Crusades, 1189–1311. Vol. 2 (Second ed.). Madison, Milwaukee, and London: University of Wisconsin Press. pp. 630–659. ISBN 0-299-04844-6.
- Edwards, Robert W. (1987). The Fortifications of Armenian Cilicia: Dumbarton Oaks Studies XXIII. Dumbarton Oaks, Trustees for Harvard University. ISBN 0-88402-163-7.
- Engel, Pál (2001). The Realm of St Stephen: A History of Medieval Hungary, 895–1526. I.B. Tauris.
- Ghazarian, Jacob G. (2000). The Armenian Kingdom in Cilicia during the Crusades: The Integration of Cilician Armenians with the Latins (1080–1393). Curzon.
- Hardwicke, Mary Nickerson (1969) [1962]. "The Crusader States, 1192–1243". In Setton, Kenneth M.; Wolff, Robert Lee; Hazard, Harry W. (eds.). A History of the Crusades, Volume II: The Later Crusades, 1189–1311. Vol. 2 (Second ed.). Madison, Milwaukee, and London: University of Wisconsin Press. pp. 519–555. ISBN 0-299-04844-6.
- Riley-Smith, J. (1967). Knights of St.John in Jerusalem and Cyprus. Palgrave MacMillan.
- Runciman, Steven (1954). A History of the Crusades, Volume III: The Kingdom of Acre and the Later Crusades. Vol. 3. Cambridge: Cambridge University Press.
- Stopka, Krzysztof (2016). Armenia Christiana: Armenian Religious Identity and the Churches of Constantinople and Rome (4th-15th century). Kraków: Jagiellonian University Press. ISBN 9788323395553.

Regnal titles
Preceded by Leo I	Queen of Cilician Armenia; 1219–1252 with Hethum I	Succeeded by Hethum I
