= Sis (ancient city) =

Ancient Armenian city

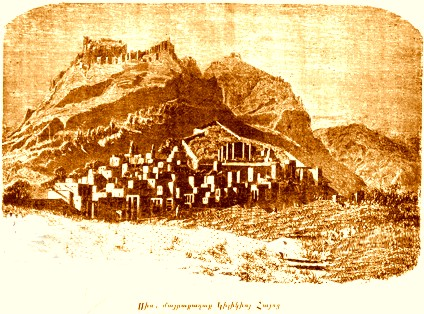
- The fortress in the ancient city of Sis

- Location within Turkey
- 37°26′40″N 35°48′37″E
- Location: Near the modern town of Kozan, Adana Province, Turkey

History
- Built: 3rd millennium BC
- Built by: Hittites And Armenians
- Abandoned: 1921

Sis (Armenian: Սիս) was the capital of the Armenian Kingdom of Cilicia. The massive fortified complex is just to the southwest of the modern Turkish town of Kozan in Adana Province.

== History ==
=== Late Bronze Age ===
==== Hittite period ====
In the 2nd millennium B.C. Sis was one of the Hittite settlements on the Cilician plain between the mountains and the Mediterranean coast.

=== Roman Period onwards ===
During the 1st century B.C. Sis appears to have been an unfortified village in the Roman province of Cilicia Secunda. The names Sisan or Sisia are first mentioned in the 5th and 6th centuries in Greek and Latin sources. In 703–04 A.D., the Byzantine settlers repulsed an Arab attack, but were soon forced to abandon the town, which became a frontier post for the Abbasid Caliphate. The Caliph Al-Mutawakkil reconstructed the Byzantine defenses in the mid-9th century. The Byzantine Emperor Nikephoros II Phokas recaptured Sis in 962 from the Abbasids, only to have it become an Armenian possession in 1113, when it was occupied by Rubenid Baron T‛oros I and repaired.

From the late 12th through the 13th centuries, the castle was significantly enlarged during the reigns of King Levon I and King Het‛um I with a "palace," residential buildings, churches, and gardens. Wilbrand von Oldenburg, a Teutonic monk who visited Sis in 1212, found a complete and well-established capital. Het‛um's wife, Zapēl, is credited with building a hospital there in 1241. A fragment of a dedicatory inscription still in situ within the castle mentions "Het‛um".

After Hromkla was conquered by the Egyptian Mamluks, Sis became the Catholicos' residence. In 1266 the Mamluks looted and burnt the city. In 1275 the Mamluks again surrounded the city, but were defeated by Armenian forces. A century later, in 1369 the Mamluks again conquered the city, but were forced to leave. Finally, in 1375 the Mamluks took the city, looted and burnt it, and captured the king and many lords. With Sis fallen, the Armenian Kingdom of Cilicia also fell and its territory was annexed into the Mamluk Sultanate.

According to Gregory of Akner,

They burned the town of Sis, which was the seat of the Armenian kings. They cast wood into the fire and great church which was the center of Sis and they burned it. They demolished the tombs of the kings.

Into the early 20th century Armenians continued to inhabit the town where several late medieval residential structures were preserved.

The castle at Sis is one of the largest fortified sites in the Levant. If laid from end to end, the circuit walls would measure almost 3 kilometers in length. The walls, towers, vaulted undercrofts, cisterns, and residential buildings are carefully adapted into the folds of the lofty outcrop of limestone. The vast majority of these constructions are built with well-cut rusticated ashlar, a masonry typical of Armenian fortifications. There are fragments of Byzantine walls as well as an entrance corridor at the southeast which was built during the Mamluk occupation and has an inscription in Arabic. Because of its strategic location, Sis has indivisibility with the castles at Andıl, Anazarbus, and Tumlu.

Directly below the castle outcrop at the southeast is a large terrace which has the remains of several important churches and chapels in the Compound of the Patriarchs, including the basilica of St. Sophia, built by King Het‛um I, and the 18th-century church of St. Gregory the Illuminator. One of the chapels, Kara Kilise, still preserves the apse and the pointed vault over the nave.

== See also ==
- Kozan, Adana
- Armenian Kingdom of Cilicia
