= Constantine I, Prince of Armenia =

Lord of Armenian Cilicia from 1095 to c. 1100

Constantine I Կոստանդին Ա
- Lord of Cilicia
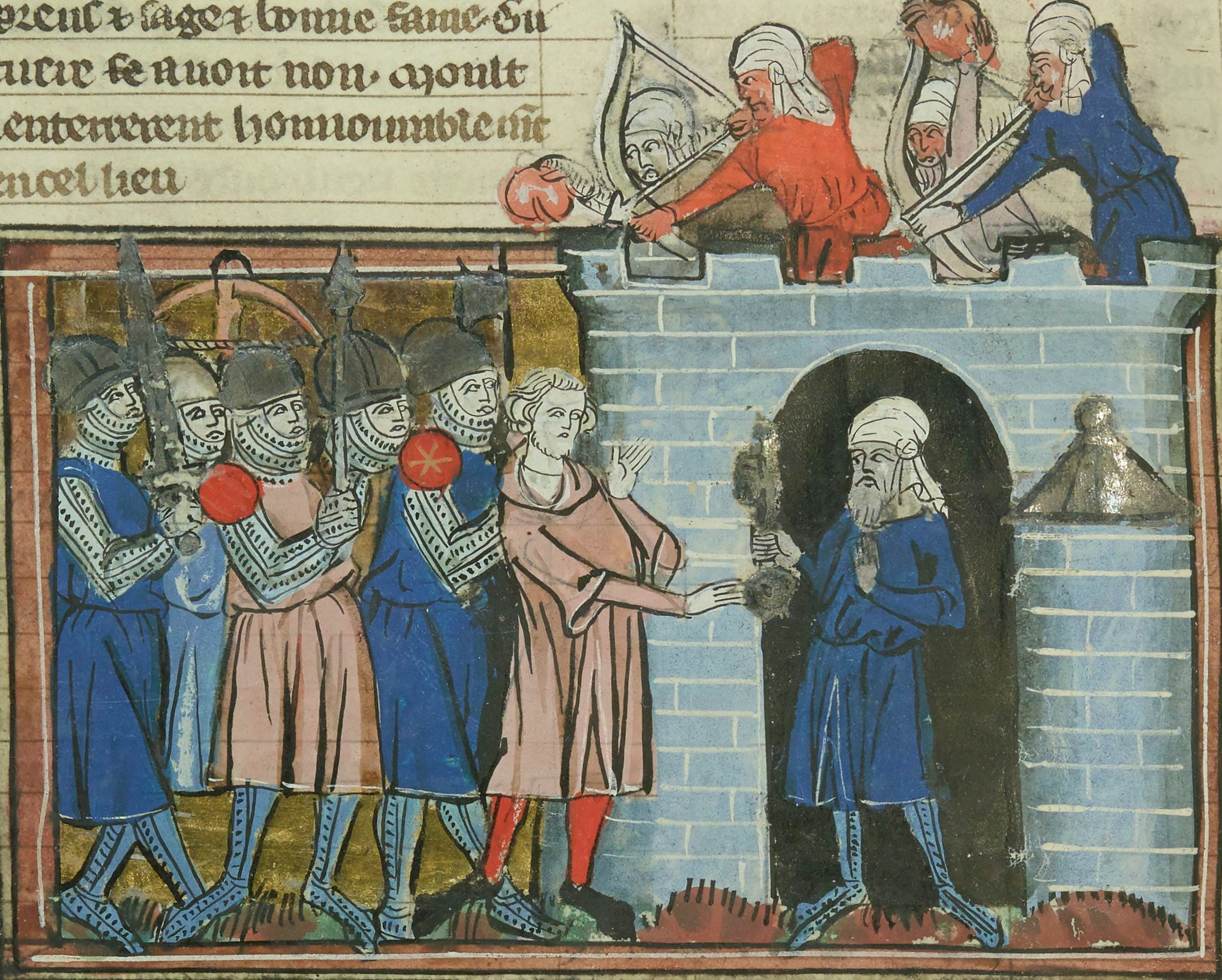
- Constantine and Tancred at Tarsus

Lord of Armenian Cilicia
- Reign: 1095 – c. 1100
- Predecessor: Roupen I
- Successor: Thoros I
- Born: 1045–50
- Died: 1102/1103
- Burial: Monastery of Castalon
- Spouse: An unnamed great-granddaughter of Bardas Phokas
- Issue: Thoros I Beatrice; Leo I
- House: Roupenians
- Father: Roupen I

Constantine I or Kostandin I (Armenian: Կոնստանտին; 1035–1040 – c. 1100) was the second lord of Armenian Cilicia from 1095 to until about 1099.

== Early years ==
He was the son of Roupen I. Constantine began leading the troops during 1090. The mastery of this mountain defile made possible the assessment of taxes on merchandise transported from the port of Ayas towards the central part of Asia Minor, a source of wealth to which the Roupenians owed their power.

== His rule ==
After his father's death in 1095, the crusaders, for their part, duly appreciated the aid of their Armenian allies.

The Chronographie of Samuel of Ani records that Constantine died soon after a lightning bolt struck his table in the fortress of Vahka. He was buried in Castalon.

== Marriage and children ==
According to the Chronicle of Aleppo, his wife was descended from Bardas Phokas.

- Beatrice (? – before 1118), the wife of Count Joscelin I of Edessa
- Thoros I, Lord of Armenian Cilicia (? – February 17, 1129 / February 16, 1130)
- Leo I, Lord of Armenian Cilicia (? – Constantinople, February 14, 1140)

== Sources ==
- Ghazarian, Jacob G. (2000). The Armenian Kingdom in Cilicia during the Crusades: The Integration of Cilician Armenians with the Latins (1080–1093). Taylor & Francis.
- Morton, Nicholas (2020). The Crusader States and Their Neighbours: A Military History, 1099-1187. Oxford University Press.

Constantine I, Prince of Armenia House of Roupen
Regnal titles
Preceded by Roupen I	Lord of Armenian Cilicia; 1095– c. 1100/1102/1103	Succeeded by Thoros I
