= Siege of Zovk =

Conflict between Armenian kingdom of Cilicia and Sultanate of Rum

- Part of Armenian-Seljuk wars
| Date | 1111 |
| Location | Cilicia |
| Result | Armenian victory |

Belligerents
| Armenian Kingdom of Cilicia | Sultanate of Rum |

Commanders and leaders
| Thoros I Apirat Pahlavuni † | Malik Shah |

The siege of Zovk took place in 1111, in the fortress of Zovk, between Armenian Kingdom of Cilicia and Sultanate of Rum.

== Background ==
For several years Thoros I enjoyed the bounty of his successes in the security of his strongholds. But his tranquillity was again disturbed in 1111 by yet another intrusion by Malik Shah of Iconium (Konya). On this occasion Toros's two commanders, Tigran and Abul-Asad were killed in battle. Baron Leo, the brother of Thoros, who at that time was near them, was so much affected by their death, that losing all command of himself, rushed furiously upon the enemy, spreading every where destruction and terror.

== Siege ==
In retaliation, the Turkish hordes in their flight laid siege to the fortress of Zovk but were badly beaten by the Armenian garrison there commanded by the great Armenian chief Apirat Pahlavuni, grandson of Grigor Magistros, and father to the brothers Grigor and Nerses the Gracious (Shnorhali). They, however, were unable to capture the fortress, and at length were obliged to raise the siege, and set forward to other expeditions. But Abirad exposing himself on the walls, was wounded by an arrow, and died. His son Basilius succeeded him in his possessions. A year after this, Basilius the Crafty died, and as he had not children, his government was exercised by the Kamsarakan chief, Degha Basilius.
