= Mleh, Prince of Armenia =

Mleh I Մլեհ Ա
- Lord of Cilicia

Lord of Armenian Cilicia
- Reign: 1170–1175
- Predecessor: Roupen II
- Successor: Roupen III
- Born: before 1120
- Died: May 15, 1175; Sis
- Burial: Medzkar
- Spouse: An unnamed daughter of Vasil of Gargar
- Issue: Grigor (illegitimate child)
- House: Roupenians
- Father: Leo I

Mleh I (Armenian: Մլեհ), also Meleh I, (before 1120 – Sis, May 15, 1175) was the eighth lord of Armenian Cilicia (1170–1175).

Soon after the death of Nur ed-Din (the emir of Aleppo), Mleh was overthrown by his nephew, Ruben III.

== Early life ==
Mleh was the fourth son of Leo I, lord of Armenian Cilicia. The name and the origin of his mother are not known with certainty. It is possible that she was a daughter of Count Hugh I of Rethel, or she might have been the daughter of Gabriel of Melitene.

All Cilicia remained under Byzantine rule for eight years.

== In the service of Nur ed-Din ==
Mleh converted to Islam from Armenian Apostolic Christianity. Afterwards, he ruled Cyrrhus.

== Rule ==
On March 10, 1171, Amalric I left Acre for Constantinople where he made a treaty with the Emperor Manuel I Comnenos.

During 1171, Mleh attacked Count Stephen I of Sancerre in Cilicia while he travelled from the Holy Land to Constantinople.

He was buried in Medzkar.

== Marriage and child ==
Mleh married an unnamed daughter of Vasil of Gargar (a sister of the Catholicos Gregory).

He had one illegitimate child by his unknown mistress:

- Grigor (? – January 28, 1209/January 27, 1210 or after)

== Sources ==
- Ghazarian, Jacob G: The Armenian Kingdom in Cilicia during the Crusades: The Integration of Cilician Armenians with the Latins (1080–1393); RoutledgeCurzon (Taylor & Francis Group), 2000, Abingdon; ISBN 0-7007-1418-9
- Gibb, Sir Hamilton A. R. (1969) [1955]. "The Career of Nūr-ad-Dīn". In Setton, Kenneth M.; Baldwin, Marshall W. (eds.). A History of the Crusades, Volume I: The First Hundred Years. Vol. 1 (Second ed.). Madison, Milwaukee, and London: University of Wisconsin Press. ISBN 0-299-04834-9.
- Runciman, Steven (1952). A History of the Crusades, Volume II: The Kingdom of Jerusalem and the Frankish East. Vol. 2. Cambridge: Cambridge University Press.

Mleh, Prince of Armenia House of Roupen
Regnal titles
Preceded by Roupen II	Lord of Armenian Cilicia; 1170–1175	Succeeded by Roupen III
