= Rubenids =

Armenian dynasty

Rubenids Ռուբինեաններ Rubenians, Roupenians, Rupenids, Roupenids
- Parent house: Bagratuni dynasty
- Country: Armenian Kingdom of Cilicia
- Founded: 1080
- Founder: Ruben I
- Final ruler: Isabella I
- Titles: Lord of Cilicia; Prince of Cilicia; King of Cilicia; Prince of Cyprus; Prince of Antioch
- Dissolution: 1252 (main line); 1342 (Hethumid-Rubenids); 1393 (Lusignan-Hethumid-Rubenids)
- Deposition: 1375 (Lusignan-Hethumid-Rubenids)
- Cadet branches: Hethumids

The Rubenids (Armenian: Ռուբինեաններ) or Roupenids were an Armenian dynasty who dominated parts of Cilicia, and who established the Armenian Kingdom of Cilicia. The dynasty takes its name from its founder, the Armenian prince Ruben I. The Rubenids were princes, later kings, of Cilicia from around 1080 until they were surpassed by the Hethumids in the mid-thirteenth century.

== History ==
The Rubenid dynasty was established when Ruben's great-grandson, Thoros, was appointed governor of a region in Cilicia by the Byzantine Emperor. Thoros expanded his territory and declared himself the ruler of the Armenian Kingdom of Cilicia in 1080. The Rubenids continued to rule Cilicia for over a century, with various members of the family taking the throne.

Under the Rubenids, the Armenian Kingdom of Cilicia flourished culturally and economically, with a vibrant artistic and literary scene. The Rubenid rulers also maintained close ties with the Crusaders, who recognized Cilicia as a Christian ally in the region. However, the kingdom ultimately fell to the Mamluk Sultanate in 1375.

The new Armenian state established very close relations with European countries and played a very important role during the Crusades, providing the Christian armies a haven and provisions on their way towards Jerusalem. Intermarriage with European crusading families was common, and European religious, political, and cultural influence was strong.

== Rubenid princes of Armenia ==
- Roupen I (1080/1081/1082 – 1095)
- Constantine I (1095 – 1100/1102/1103)
- Thoros I (1100/1102/1103 – 1129/1130)
- Constantine II (1129/1130)
- Leo I (1129/1130 – 1137)
- Thoros II (1144/1145 – 1169)
- Roupen II (1169–1170)
- Mleh (1170–1175)
- Roupen III (1175–1187)
- Leo II (1187 – 1198/1199)

== Rubenid kings of Armenia ==
- Leo I (1198/1199 – 1219)
- Isabella (1219–1252)
