= Cyzistra =

Town of ancient Cappadocia

Coordinates: 38°21′03″N 34°57′26″E

Cyzistra or Kyzistra (Ancient Greek: Κύζιστρα) was a town of ancient Cappadocia, inhabited during Roman and Byzantine times. It was mentioned by Ptolemy.

Its site is located near Zengibar Kalesi, Asiatic Turkey.
