= A History of the Crusades =

Book by Steven Runciman

First editions (publ. Cambridge University Press)

A History of the Crusades by Steven Runciman, published in three volumes during 1951–1954 (vol. I - The First Crusade and the Foundation of the Kingdom of Jerusalem; vol. II - The Kingdom of Jerusalem and the Frankish East, 1100-1187; vol. III - The Kingdom of Acre and the Later Crusades), is an influential work in the historiography of the Crusades, including the events that led up to those expeditions to the Holy Land and an extensive study of primary sources in Greek, Latin, Armenian and Arabic.

== Runciman's approach ==
At the time of its initial publication, it offered a novel interpretation of the crusades. Runciman presented them not as Christendom's defensive war against the threat of Islamic expansion, but as a continuation of the destructive "barbarian invasions" that had led to the fall of Rome. Furthermore, Runciman includes the history of the Byzantine Empire in his scope, moving his focus further east and at the same time tempering the "Romantic" view of the crusades as heroic or chivalrous enterprise.

When the first volume appeared in 1951, Egyptian historian Aziz Atiya noted that it was "essentially a narrative of crusading events rather than an analytical study and a discussion of problems." He also noted that Runciman did not have full access to Arabic texts but limited himself to the excerpts found in European editions.

== Distribution and influence ==
The History has seen numerous reprints and translations and in some respects has come to be seen as a standard work on the crusades. Its scope encompasses the ascendancy of Islam in the Levant during the early 7th century until the fall of Acre in 1291, with later chapters covering through 1464, the time of Pope Pius II.

Along with Jonathan Riley-Smith's The Crusades: A Short History, Runciman's work is one of the most widely-read works about the crusades.

== Criticism ==
Runciman's approach, while it may have had value in overcoming overly romantic views of the crusades held in the 19th century, has not aged well and is now seen as having gone beyond the mark by painting the crusaders as "simpletons or barbarians". (Note: According to Madden "It is no exaggeration to say that Runciman single-handedly crafted the current popular concept of the crusades. The reasons for this are twofold. First, he was a learned man with a solid grasp of the chronicle sources. Second, and perhaps more important, he wrote beautifully. The picture of the crusades that Runciman painted owed much to current scholarship yet much more to Sir Walter Scott. Throughout his history Runciman portrayed the crusaders as simpletons or barbarians seeking salvation through the destruction of the sophisticated cultures of the east. In his famous "summing-up" of the crusades he concluded that "the Holy War in itself was nothing more than a long act of intolerance in the name of God, which is a sin against Holy Ghost.”)

Thomas F. Madden, writing in 2002, called the work "terrible history yet wonderfully entertaining". Runciman was said to have embraced subjectivity and to be prone to polemics. He himself stated that "The historian must attempt to add to his subjective study the qualities of intuitive sympathy and imaginative perception, without which he cannot hope to comprehend the fears and aspirations and convictions that have moved past generations." It is nevertheless undisputed that the work contains genuine scholarship and exerted great influence on scholars educated in the West from the 1950s to the 1970s.
