= List of Armenian royal consorts =

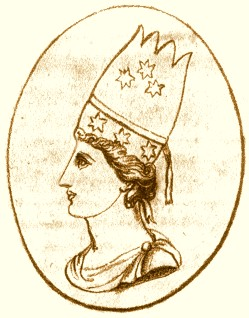
Queen Erato of the Artaxiad dynasty

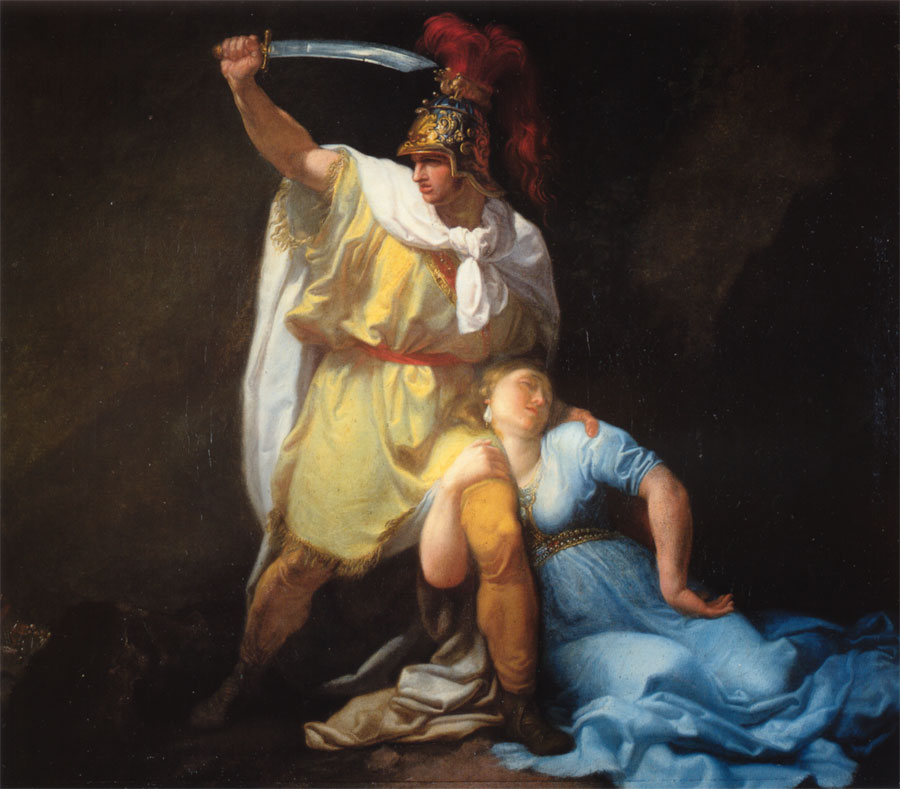
King Rhadamistus killing Queen Zenobia, by Luigi Sabatell.

This is a list of Armenian royal consorts.

== Kingdom of Armenia ==
=== Ancient Armenian queens ===
- Rodogune of Persia, daughter of King Artaxerxes of Persia, wife of Orontes II
- Antiochis, sister of Antiochus III the Great, wife of Xerxes
- Satenik of the Alans, daughter of the king of the Alans, wife of Artaxias I
- Cleopatra of Pontus, daughter of Mithridates VI of Pontus, wife of Tigranes II the Great
- Erato of Armenia, half-sister and wife of Tigranes IV; also co-ruler
- Zenobia, daughter of Mithridates of Armenia, and wife of Rhadamistus
- Ashkhen, wife of Tiridates III of Armenia
- Pharantzem, wife of Arsaces II (Arshak II)
- Zarmandukht, wife of Papas (Pap); queen regent

=== Bagratuni dynasty, 862–1045 ===
Picture	Name	Father	Birth	Marriage	Became Queen	Ceased to be Queen	Death	Spouse
	Katranide I	-	825	-	862 husband's appointment as Prince of Princes; 26 August 884 husband's coronation as King	890 husband's death	-	Ashot I
The name of Smbat I's wife is not known. She was captured in the fortress of Kars in 895 by the ostikan Afshin, but was released when her son Ashot II was given as hostage and her husband agreed to marry his niece to Afshin.								Smbat I
	Sahakanuysh Sevada	-	-	-	914 husband's accession	928 husband's death	-	Ashot II
The name of Abas I's wife is not known. They had five known children.								Abas I
	Khosrovanuysh	-		-	953	877 husband's death	-	Ashot III
The name of Smbat II's wife is not known. Said to be his niece.								Smbat II
	Katranide II	Syuni	-	-	989 husband's accession	1020 husband's death	-	Gagik I
The name of Abas I's first wife is not known. She was mother of his only son, Erkat.								Hovhannes-Smbat III
	Argyra	a brother of Romanos III Argyros (Argyroi)	-	1032		1040 husband's death	-	Hovhannes-Smbat III
The name of Ashot IV's wife is not known. They had two known children.								Ashot IV
	? of Vaspurakan	Dawid of Vaspurakan, Lord of Siwas	-	-	1042 husband's accession	1045 husband's desposition	-	Gagik II

== Armenian Kingdom of Cilicia ==
=== Princess consort of Armenia, Lady of the Mountains ===
==== Rubenid dynasty, 1080–1198 ====
Picture	Name	Father	Birth	Marriage	Became Princess	Ceased to be Princess	Death	Spouse
The name of Ruben I's wife is not known. Mother to Constantine I.								Ruben I
	Phokaina	a grandchild of Bardas Phokas (Phokas)	-	-	1095 husband's accession	1100/24 February 1102/23 February 1103 husband's death	-	Constantine I
The name of Thoros I's wife is not known. They had two children.								Thoros I
	unnamed	possibly of Hugh I of Rethel or Gabriel of Melitene	-	1100/03	1129 husband's accession			Leo I
The name of Leo I's second wife is not known. They had no children.								Leo I
	Isabelle de Courtenay	Joscelin II, Count of Edessa (Courtenay)	after 1133	1149		1150/59		Thoros II
	unnamed	Simon of Raban	after 1133	1149		1150/59		Thoros II
	unnamed	Thomas the Regent (Rubenids)	-	1164		1169 husband's abdication	-	Thoros II
	unnamed	Vasil of Gargar	-	-	1170 husband's accession	15 May 1175 husband's death	-	Mleh I
	Isabelle of Toron	Humphrey III of Toron (Toron)	-	4 February 1181/3 February 1182		1187 husband's abdication	-	Ruben III
	Isabelle of Antioch	a brother of Sibylle, the wife of Bohemond III of Antioch	-	3 February 1188/4 February 1189		6 January 1198/1199 became Queen	1207	Leo II

=== Queen consort or male consort of Armenia ===
==== Rubenid dynasty, 1198–1252 ====
Picture	Name	Father	Birth	Marriage	Became Queen	Ceased to be Queen	Death	Spouse
	Isabelle	a niece of Sibylle, the wife of Bohemond III of Antioch	-	3 February 1188 – 4 February 1189	6 January 1198/1199 became Queen	1206 divorce	1207	Leo I
	Sibylla of Lusignan	Amalric II of Jerusalem (Lusignan)	October–November 1198/1199/1200	28 January 1210/27 January 1211		May, 1219 husband's abdication	after 1225 or 1230 or 1252	Leo I
	Philip of Antioch (also co-ruler)	Bohemond IV of Antioch (Ramnulfids)	-	25 January 1221/24 January 1222		1225/26		Isabella
	Hethum I (also co-ruler)	Constantine of Baberon (Hethumids)	1215	14 June 1226		23 January 1252 wife's death and his own accession	28 October 1270	Isabella

==== Hethumid dynasty, 1252–1341 ====
Picture	Name	Father	Birth	Marriage	Became Queen	Ceased to be Queen	Death	Spouse
	Anna of Lampron	Prince Hethum IV of Lampron (Hethumids)	-	early 15 January 1262/14 January 1263	early 1269 husband's accession	28 July 1285		Leo II
	Margaret of Lusignan	Hugh III of Cyprus (Lusignan)	1276	9 January 1288	1293 husband's accession	1296		Thoros III
	a Mongol princess	Ghazan or another relative (Borjigids)	-	1297		23 July 1298 husband's death	-	Thoros III
	a Mongol princess	Ghazan or another relative (Borjigids)	-	1297		1298 husband's death	-	Sempad
	Agnes-Marie of Lusignan	Amalric, Lord of Tyre (Lusignan)	-	1305/06		17 November 1307 husband's death	after 10 October 1309	Leo III
	Isabelle of Korikos	Hetoum of Korikos (Hethumids)	-	-	17 November 1307 husband's accession	3 April 1310		Oshin
	Isabelle of Lusignan	Hugh III of Cyprus (Lusignan)	1280	1310		before 1316 divorce	1319	Oshin
	Joan of Anjou	Philip I, Prince of Taranto (Anjou-Taranto)	1297	February 1316		20 July 1320 husband's death	1317 or March 1323	Oshin
	Alice of Korikos	Oshin of Korikos (Hethumids)	-	10 August 1321		1329		Leo IV
	Constance of Sicily	Frederick III of Sicily (Barcelona)	1307	29 December 1331		28 August 1341 husband's death	after 19 June 1344	Leo IV

==== Lusignan dynasty, 1341–1375 ====
Picture	Name	Father	Birth	Marriage	Became Queen	Ceased to be Queen	Death	Spouse
	Theodora Syrgiannaina	sister of Syrgiannes Palaiologos Philanthropenos (Philanthropenos)	-	1330–1332	1342 husband's accession	17 April 1344 husband's death	30 June 1347/1349	Constantine II
	Marie of Korikos	Oshin of Korikos (Hethumids)	1321	1340	17 April 1344 husband's accession	21 December 1362 husband's death	1377/1405	Constantine III
	Marie of Korikos	Oshin of Korikos (Hethumids)	1321	1369		April 1373 husband's death	1377/1405	Constantine IV
	Margaret of Soissons	John of Soissons, Bailiff of Famagusta (Soissons)	-	May 1369	April 1373 husband's accession	1375 husband's surrender to the Mameluks	1379-4 July 1381	Leo V

== See also ==
- Princess of Antioch
- List of Latin empresses
