= Constantine of Armenia =

Constantine of Armenia may refer to:

- Constantine I, Prince of Armenia (died 1102)
- Constantine II, Prince of Armenia (died 1129)
- Constantine I, King of Armenia (1278–1310), also sometimes called Constantine III of Armenia
- Constantine II, King of Armenia (1342–1344)
- Constantine of Baberon, 13th century father of King Hethoum I
- Constantine III, King of Armenia (died 1362), sometimes called Constantine V of Armenia
- Constantine IV, King of Armenia (died 1373), sometimes called Constantine VI of Armenia
