= Joan of Taranto =

Queen of Armenia 1316 to 1320

Queen consort of Armenia
- Tenure: 1316–1320
- Died: March 1323
- Spouse: Oshin, King of Armenia; Oshin of Korikos
- Issue: George of Armenia; Maria, Queen of Armenia
- House: Capetian House of Anjou
- Father: Philip I, Prince of Taranto
- Mother: Thamar Angelina Komnene

Joan of Taranto (also Jeanne of Anjou, Joan of Anjou, Joan of Anjou-Taranto) (died March 1323) was Queen of Armenia by marriage to Oshin, King of Armenia. As daughter of Philip I, Prince of Taranto, she was a member of the Capetian House of Anjou.

== Life ==
Joan was daughter of Philip I, Prince of Taranto, and his first wife Thamar Angelina Komnene.

Joan's parents did not have a good relationship: Philip suspected Thamar of acting in her family's interests over his during the two-year conflict that raged between the Capetian House of Anjou and Epirus, despite the fact that she had pawned the remainder of her jewellery to help him pay for the military effort. Distrustful of Thamar, Philip decided to divorce her and in 1309 accused her of having committed adultery. She was forced into confessing that she had had sexual relationships with at least forty of the lords of his court, and that she had formed a particular relationship with Bartolomeo Siginulfo, the Grand Chamberlain of Taranto. Thamar became an outcast, probably never seeing her children again, she either became a nun or was imprisoned by Philip. In either case she died not long afterwards in 1311.

Shortly following her mother's death, Joan acquired a stepmother in Catherine of Valois, who Philip married in July 1313. From this marriage Joan acquired five half-siblings, including Philip II, Prince of Taranto.

=== Queen ===
In February 1316, Joan married her first husband, Oshin, King of Armenia. Joan was Oshin's third wife, from his first marriage he had had a son Leo. From this marriage she adopted the name Eirene. The couple were only married for four years.

Upon his death, on 20 July 1320, Oshin was succeeded by his minor son Leo (sometimes referred to as Leo V). It was believed that Oshin was poisoned.

Soon after Oshin's death, his cousin Oshin of Korikos became regent. He wished to make himself and his family more secure in Armenia. Steps were taken to make this happen; Oshin married Joan, who was forced into the marriage. Oshin married his daughter Alice off to Joan's stepson Leo. Oshin was also probably responsible for the deaths of King Oshin's sister Isabella and two of her sons, in order to remove rival claimants.

Joan died in March 1323, she was outlived by her ill-fated second husband.

Six years after Joan's death, Leo reached majority, he took revenge on his regent. Joan's husband and brother-in-law Constantine, Constable of Armenia and Lord of Lampron, and Leo's wife Alice were all murdered on the king's orders, the head of Oshin being sent to the Ilkhan and of Constantine to Al-Nasr Muhammad.

== Issue ==
In her first marriage she had one child:

- George (1317 – after 1323), died young

Oshin and Joan had one daughter:

- Maria who consecutively married two Armenian Kings of Cilicia, Constantine V and Constantine VI. She had issue.

== Sources ==
- Nicol, Donald M. (1984). The Despotate of Epiros 1267-1479: A Contribution to the History of Greece in the Middle Ages. Cambridge University Press. ISBN 9780521261906.

Joan of Taranto Capetian House of Anjou Cadet branch of the Capetian dynasty Born: circa. 1297 Died: March 1323
Royal titles
Vacant Title last held by Isabelle of Lusignan	Queen consort of Armenia; 1316–1320	Vacant Title next held by Alice of Korikos
