= King Constantine =

King Constantine may refer to:

- Constantine (Briton) (520–523), a king of Dumnonia in sub-Roman Britain
- Constantine I of Georgia (d. 1412), King of Georgia from 1405 or 1407 until his death
- Constantine II of Georgia (ca. 1447–1505), of the Bagrationi dynasty, king of Georgia from 1478
- Constantine I of Greece (1868–1923), King of Greece from 1913 to 1917 and from 1920 to 1922
- Constantine II of Greece (1940–2023), King of Greece from 1964 until abolition of the monarchy of Greece in 1973
- Constantine mac Fergusa (d. 820), a king of the Picts
- Constantine I of Scotland (d. 877), a king of the Picts
- Constantine II of Scotland (d. 952), an early King of Scotland
- Constantine III of Scotland (born ca. 970–997), king of Scots from 995 to 997
- Constantine I, King of Armenia (r. 1298–1299, d. 1310)
- Constantine II, King of Armenia (r. 1342–1344), also called Guy
- Constantine III, King of Armenia (r. 1344–1362)
- Constantine IV, King of Armenia (r. 1362–1373)
