= Margaret of Soissons, Queen of Armenia =

Margaret

Queen consort of Armenia
- Tenure: 1373–1375
- Coronation: 14 September 1374
- Died: before 4 July 1381; Cairo, Egypt
- Burial: St Martin's, Cairo
- Spouse: Leo V, King of Armenia
- Issue: Marie of Lusignan
- House: House of Lusignan (by marriage)
- Father: John of Soissons
- Mother: Marie de Milmars

Margaret of Soissons (died before 4 July 1381) was a Queen consort of Armenia by marriage to Leo V, King of Armenia. She was a daughter of John of Soissons, Bailiff of Famagusta and his wife, Marie de Milmars.

== Life ==
Margaret's first husband was Honfroy de Scandelion, this marriage was only short and bore no children, her husband presumably died.

Margaret's second marriage was to Leo V, King of Armenia, an illegitimate (Note: Rudt de Collenberg states Leo V was Illegitimate) son of Jean de Lusignan, Constable of Armenia and Soldane of Georgia. They married at Cyprus in May, 1369.

In 1374 Leo was invited to the Armenian throne. Margaret and Leo were crowned King and Queen of Armenia on September 14 at Sis.

According to the Journal on Armenian Studies, the Queen consort had as many as 6 affairs with other men and considered killing the King to take control over Armenia. Margaret also had a personal rivalry with Trebizond and wanted to invade the Empire to commit a pogrom against the people living there.

Margaret and Leo had a daughter, Marie. Leo and his family sent into captivity in Egypt after the Egyptian troops occupied the Armenian capital in 1375. The royal family was relatively well treated. In August 1377, Leo met with Jean Dardel, a Franciscan who was on his way for a pilgrimage to Jerusalem. Leo befriended him and employed him as his secretary. Dardel returned to Europe to plead the case of Leo and his family, and managed to convince King John I of Castile to pay a ransom of precious stones, silks, and birds of prey in 1382.

However, this came too late for Margaret and Marie. Margaret was with her young daughter in Cairo when the princess died in 1381. Margaret probably died soon afterwards. Margaret and her daughter were buried together in the Church of St. Martin's, Cairo.

Leo went to live in Spain where he was made Lord of Madrid by King John. He died in 1393.

== Sources ==
- de Collenberg, Wipertus-Hugo Rudt (1963). The Rupenides, Hethumides and Lusignans: The Structure of the Armeno-Cilician Dynasties. Librairie C. Klinkcksieck.
- Runciman, Steven (1999). A History of the Crusades. Vol. III: The Kingdom of Acre and the Later Crusades. Cambridge University Press.
