= Constantin, King of Armenia =

Constantin, King of Armenia may refer to:

- Constantine I, King of Armenia
- Constantine II, King of Armenia
- Constantine III, King of Armenia
