= List of Armenian monarchs =

King of Armenia
- Flag of Bagratuni dynasty

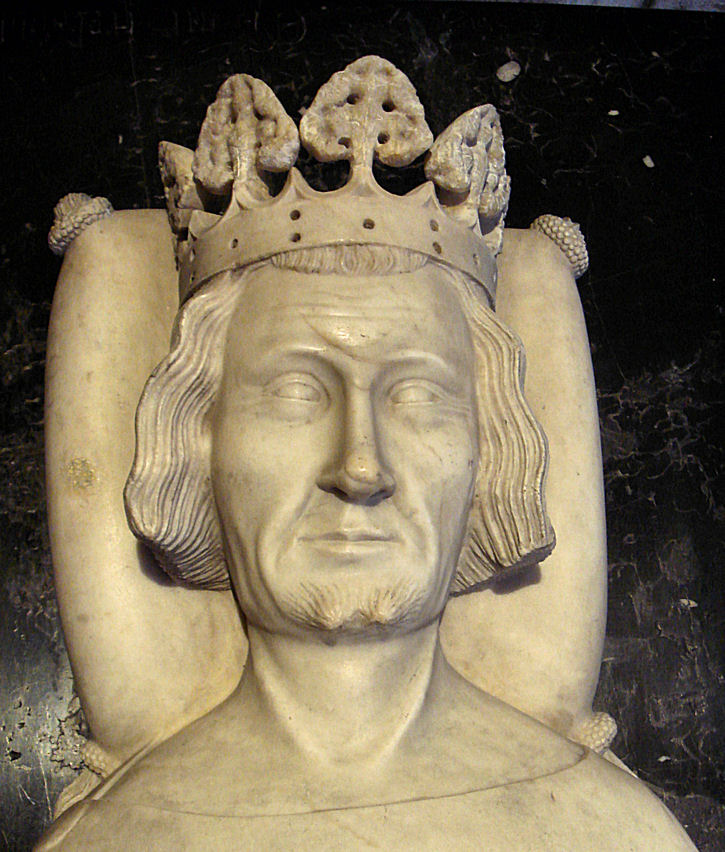
- Statue of King Leo V, last Armenian monarch

Details
- First monarch: Hydarnes I (satrap); Orontes II (king)
- Last monarch: Leo V
- Formed: 521 BC (satrapy); 331 BC (kingdom)
- Abolished: 1375
- Residences: Armavir; Yervandashat; Artaxata; Tigranocerta; Vagharshapat; Dvin; Bagaran; Shirakavan; Kars; Ani; Tarsus; Sis

This is a list of the monarchs of Armenia, rulers of the ancient Kingdom of Armenia (331 BC – AD 428), the medieval Kingdom of Armenia (884–1045), various lesser Armenian kingdoms (908–1170), and finally the Armenian Kingdom of Cilicia (1198–1375). The list also includes prominent vassal princes and lords who ruled during times without an Armenian kingdom, as well as later claimants to the position.

== Ancient Armenia (521 BC – AD 428) ==
=== Early satraps (521–401 BC) ===
- Hydarnes I, satrap in the late 6th century BC?, granted Armenia by the Achaemenid king Darius I as a semi-hereditary satrapy
- Hydarnes II, satrap in the early 5th century BC?
- Hydarnes III, satrap in the middle of the 5th century BC
- Terituchmes, satrap in the second half of the 5th century BC

=== Orontid dynasty (401–200 BC) ===
Portrait	Name	Reign	Succession	Life details
	Orontes I	c. 401–344 BC (satrap) (c. 57 years)	Made satrap of Armenia under the Achaemenid king Artaxerxes II. Governed virtually autonomously.	
	Orontes II	c. 344–331 BC (satrap) (c. 13 years) c. 331 BC (king) (Note: It is not fully certain when Armenian rulers began to style themselves as kings in their own right. This list follows Toumanoff (1963) and Lang (2021) in considering Orontes II to be the first "king".) (c. less than a year)		Died fighting on the side of the Achaemenid Empire against Alexander the Great at the Battle of Gaugamela
	Mithrenes	c. 331–317 BC (c. 14 years)	Son of Orontes II, defected to join Alexander the Great and named the new ruler of Armenia by Alexander after his father's death	
	Neoptolemus	323–321 BC (satrap) (2 years)		
	Orontes III	c. 317–260 BC (c. 57 years)		
	Sames	c. 260 BC (less than a year)		
	Arsames	c. 260–228 BC (c. 32 years)		
	Xerxes	c. 228–212 BC (c. 16 years)		
	Orontes IV	c. 212–200 BC (c. 12 years)		

=== Artaxiad dynasty (200 BC–AD 2/12) ===
Portrait	Name	Reign	Succession	Life details
	Artaxias I	c. 190–130 BC (c. 30 years)	Unclear succession. According to Strabo, Artaxias I was a general under the Seleucid king Antiochus III who seized power in Armenia, but according to Artaxias's own inscriptions he appears to have been part of a junior line of the Orontid dynasty.	
	Artavasdes	c. 160–115 BC (c. 45 years)		
	Tigranes I	c. 120–95 BC (c. 35 years; disputed)		
	Tigranes II "the Great"	c. 95–55 BC (c. 40 years)		
	Artavasdes II	c. 55–34 BC (c. 21 years)		
	Artaxias II	c. 34–20 BC (c. 14 years)		
	Tigranes III	c. 20–8 BC (c. 12 years)		
	Tigranes IV	c. 8–5 BC (first), 2 BC–AD 1 (second) (c. 5 years)		
	Erato	c. 8–5 BC (first), 2 BC–AD 2 (second), 6–12 AD (third) (c. 13 years)		
	Artavasdes III	5–2 BC		

=== Non-dynastic rulers (2–61) ===
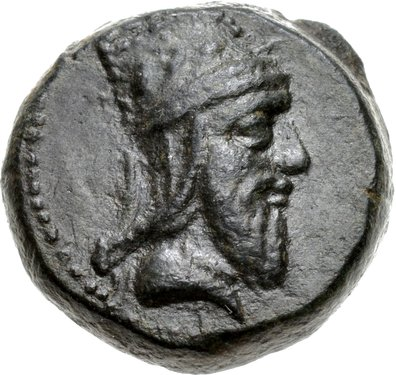
Coin of Tigranes V (r. 6–12)

The first century AD was a time of intense conflict between the Roman and Parthian empires. In Armenia, this resulted in rapid appointments and depositions of Armenian client kings by both sides.

- Ariobarzanes, 2–4, a Median prince and matrilineal descendant of Tigranes II
- Artavasdes IV, 4–6, son of Ariobarzanes
- Tigranes V, (Note: Tigranes V was an Artaxiad only by his mother's lineage.) 6–12, a Herodian prince
- Vonones, 12–18, former king of the Parthian Empire
- Artaxias III, 18–34, a Pontic prince
- Arsaces (Arshak I), 34–35, son of the Parthian king Artabanus II
- Mithridates (first reign), 35–37, brother of the Iberian king Pharasmanes I
- Orodes, 37–41, son of the Parthian king Artabanus II
- Mithridates (second reign), 41–52
- Rhadamistus, 52–54, son of the Iberian king Pharasmanes I
- Tiridates I (first reign), 54–58, son of the Parthian king Vonones II
- Tigranes VI, 58–61/62, nephew of Tigranes V

=== Arsacid dynasty (61–428) ===
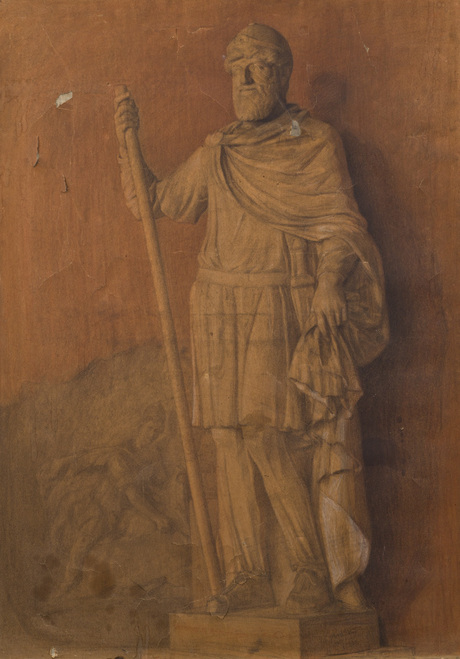
Statue of Tiridates I (r. 54–58, 61/66–75/88)

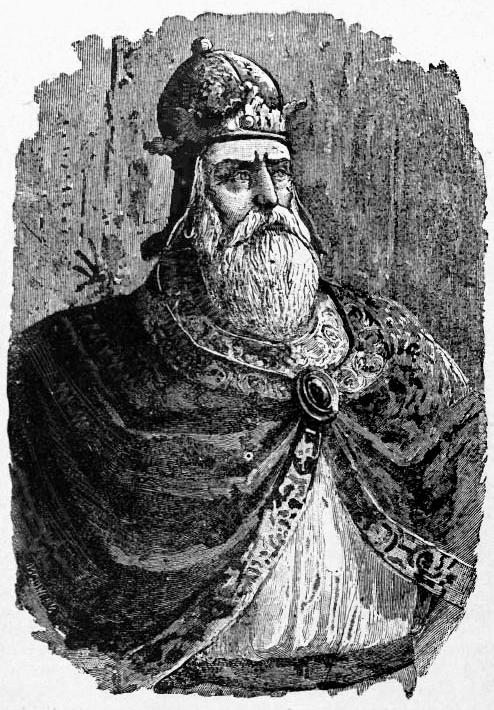
Modern depiction of Tiridates III (r. 298–330)

- Tiridates I (second reign), c. 61/66–c. 75/88
- Sanatruk, c. 75/88–c. 110, son of Tiridates I?
- Axidares, c. 110–c. 112, son of the Parthian king Pacorus II
- Parthamasiris, c. 112–c. 114, son of the Parthian king Pacorus II
  - Interregnum 114–117: Armenia is temporarily incorporated as a province of the Roman Empire
- Vologases I, 117–144, son of Sanatruk
- Sohaemus (first reign), 144–160, a Roman consul with Arsacid and Achaemenid heritage
- Aurelius Pacorus, 160–163, son of the Parthian king Vologases IV
- Sohaemus (second reign), 164–c. 180
- Vologases II, c. 180–190, son of the Parthian king Vologases IV, later ruled Parthia (as Vologases V) 190–208
- Khosrov I, c. 190–214/216, son of Vologases II
- Tiridates II, 217–252, son of Khosrov I
- Hormizd-Ardashir, 252/253– c. 270, son of the Sasanian king Shapur I; made king of Armenia by his father after the Sasanians conquered the kingdom, later king of the Sasanian Empire (as Hormizd I)
- Narseh, c. 270–293, brother of Hormizd-Ardashir, later king of the Sasanian Empire
- Khosrov II, 279/280–287 (in western Armenia), son of Tiridates II?, enthroned by the Romans after Narseh ceded parts of western Armenia to Emperor Probus
- Tiridates (III), 287–298, brother of Khosrov II, initially king of only western Armenia but later granted the rest of the kingdom after Narseh became king of the Sasanian Empire
- Tiridates III (or IV) "the Great", 298–330, son of Khosrov II
- Khosrov III "the Small", 330–338, son of Tiridates III
  - Sanesan, a Sasanian-backed usurper belonging to the Arsacid dynasty, held much of Armenia for about a year in circa 336.
  - Hannibalianus, son of Roman emperor Constantine I, was nominated by the Romans as king of Armenia in 335/336 but died in 337 without Khosrov III having been displaced.
- Tiran (Tigranes VII), 338–350, son of Khosrov III
- Arshak II, 350–368, son of Tiran
- Pap, 368–374, son of Arshak II
- Varazdat, 374–378, nephew of Pap (perhaps son of Pap's younger brother, Tiridates)
- Arshak III, c. 378–387 and Vologases III, c. 378–386, sons of Pap

In 384, the Sasanian Empire appointed Khosrov IV as Armenian king, in opposition to the Roman-supported Arshak III. This resulted in Armenia becoming informally divided under the two kings. In 387, the division was made formal through an agreement between the Roman emperor Theodosius I and Sasanian king Shapur III. The agreement saw Armenia be partitioned into a western (under Roman influence) and an eastern (under Sasanian influence) kingdom.

==== Western Armenia (387–389) ====
- Arshak III, 387–c. 389, former king of all of Armenia

Upon the death of Arshak III in 389, Emperor Theodosius I chose to not appoint another king, ending the western kingdom. Arshak's lands were instead incorporated into the Roman Empire.

==== Eastern Armenia (384–428) ====
- Khosrov IV, 384–389, son of Varazdat?
- Vramshapuh, 389/401–417, son of Varazdat?
- Khosrov V, 417–418, possibly the same person as Khosrov IV
- Shapur, 418–422, son of the Sasanian king Yazdegerd I, later king of the Sasanian Empire (as Shapur IV)
- Artaxias IV, 422–428, son of Vramshapuh

In 428, the Sasanian king Bahram V deposed Artaxias IV, with the permission of the Armenian nobility, and annexed his lands into the Sasanian Empire.

== Vassal lords and princes (428–884) ==
=== Marzbāns in Sasanian Armenia (428–646) ===
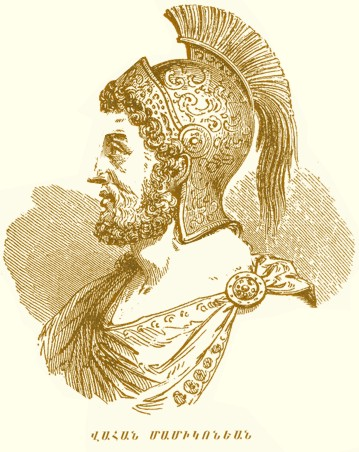
20th-century artwork of Vahan I Mamikonian, autonomous marzbān 485–505/510

The Sasanian-ruled Armenian territories were after 428 placed under the rule of an official with the title marzbān (governor-general or viceroy). The first marzbān, appointed by Bahram V, was the military officer Veh Mihr Shapur.

The list of marzbāns is not entirely contiguous. This is due to gaps in the historical record as well as there having been periods without any appointed marzbāns. It was relatively common for the office to be vacant since the Sasanian Empire periodically tried to assert more direct control.

- Veh Mihr Shapur, marzbān 428–442, Sasanian military officer
- Vasak Siwni, marzbān c. 442–451, Armenian noble
- Adhur Hormizd, marzbān c. 452–465
- Adhur Gushnasp, marzbān 465–482
- Sahak II Bagratuni, insurgent marzbān 482–483, Armenian noble
- Vahan I Mamikonian, autonomous marzbān 485–505/510, Armenian noble
- Vard Mamikonian, autonomous marzbān 505/510–509/514, Armenian noble
- Mjej I Gnuni, marzbān 518–548, Armenian noble
- Philip Siwni, marzbān 574–576, Armenian noble
- Mushegh II Mamikonian, marzbān 591?, Armenian noble
- Varaztirots II Bagratuni, marzbān 628 – after 631, Armenian noble

=== Presiding princes of Armenia (628–884) ===
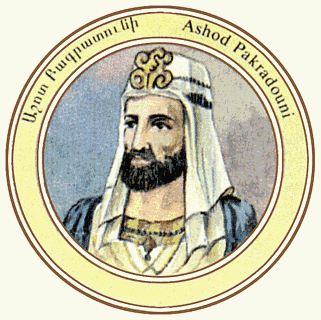
Modern imaginary portrait of Ashot V Bagratuni, who served as the last presiding prince of Armenia 856–884 and later reigned as King of Armenia (as Ashot I) 884–890

In the sixth century, the Byzantine Empire established the position of presiding prince of Armenia (formally "prince of the Armenians"). This office was created in an attempt to legitimize a local vassal leader with Byzantine backing and counteract Sasanian efforts in the region. During later centuries, the princes often wavered in allegiance between Byzantium and the Islamic Caliphates, who competed over influence in the region. The princes were most often autonomous tributary vassals. The earliest known presiding prince of Armenia is Mjej II Gnuni, appointed by the Byzantines in the early seventh century.

- Mjej II Gnuni, 628–635 (for the Byzantine Empire)
- David Saharuni, 635–638 (for the Byzantine Empire)
- Theodore Rshtuni (first time), 638–c. 645 (for the Byzantine Empire)
- Varaztirots II Bagratuni, c. 645 (for the Byzantine Empire)
- Theodore Rshtuni (second time), 645–653 (for the Byzantine Empire), 653–655 (for the Rashidun Caliphate)
- Mushegh IV Mamikonian, 654 (for the Byzantine Empire)
- Hamazasp Mamikonian, 655–657 (for the Rashidun Caliphate), 657–658 (for the Byzantine Empire)
- Grigor I Mamikonian, 662–684/685 (for the Umayyad Caliphate)
- Ashot II Bagratuni, 686–689/690 (for the Umayyad Caliphate)
- Nerseh Kamsarakan, 689/690–691 (for the Byzantine Empire)
- Smbat VI Bagratuni, 691–697; 700–711 (for the Byzantine Empire), 697–700 (for the Umayyad Caliphate)
- Ashot III Bagratuni "the Blind", 732–748 (for the Umayyad Caliphate)
- Grigor II Mamikonian, 748–750 (for the Umayyad Caliphate)
- Mushegh VI Mamikonian, c. 750; head of insurgent members of the nobility
- Sahak III Bagratuni, c. 755–761 (for the Abbasid Caliphate)
- Smbat VII Bagratuni, 761–772 (for the Abbasid Caliphate)
- Tatzates Andzevatsi, 780–782/785 (for the Abbasid Caliphate)
- Ashot IV Bagratuni "the Carnivorous", 806–826 (for the Abbasid Caliphate)
- Smbat VIII Bagratuni "the Confessor", 826–855 (for the Abbasid Caliphate)
- Bagrat II Bagratuni, "Prince of Princes" 830–852 (for the Abbasid Caliphate)
- Ashot V Bagratuni "the Great", 856–884 (for the Abbasid Caliphate); "Prince of Princes" in 856 and king in 884

== Restored kingdom (884–1045) ==
=== Bagratuni dynasty (884–1045) ===
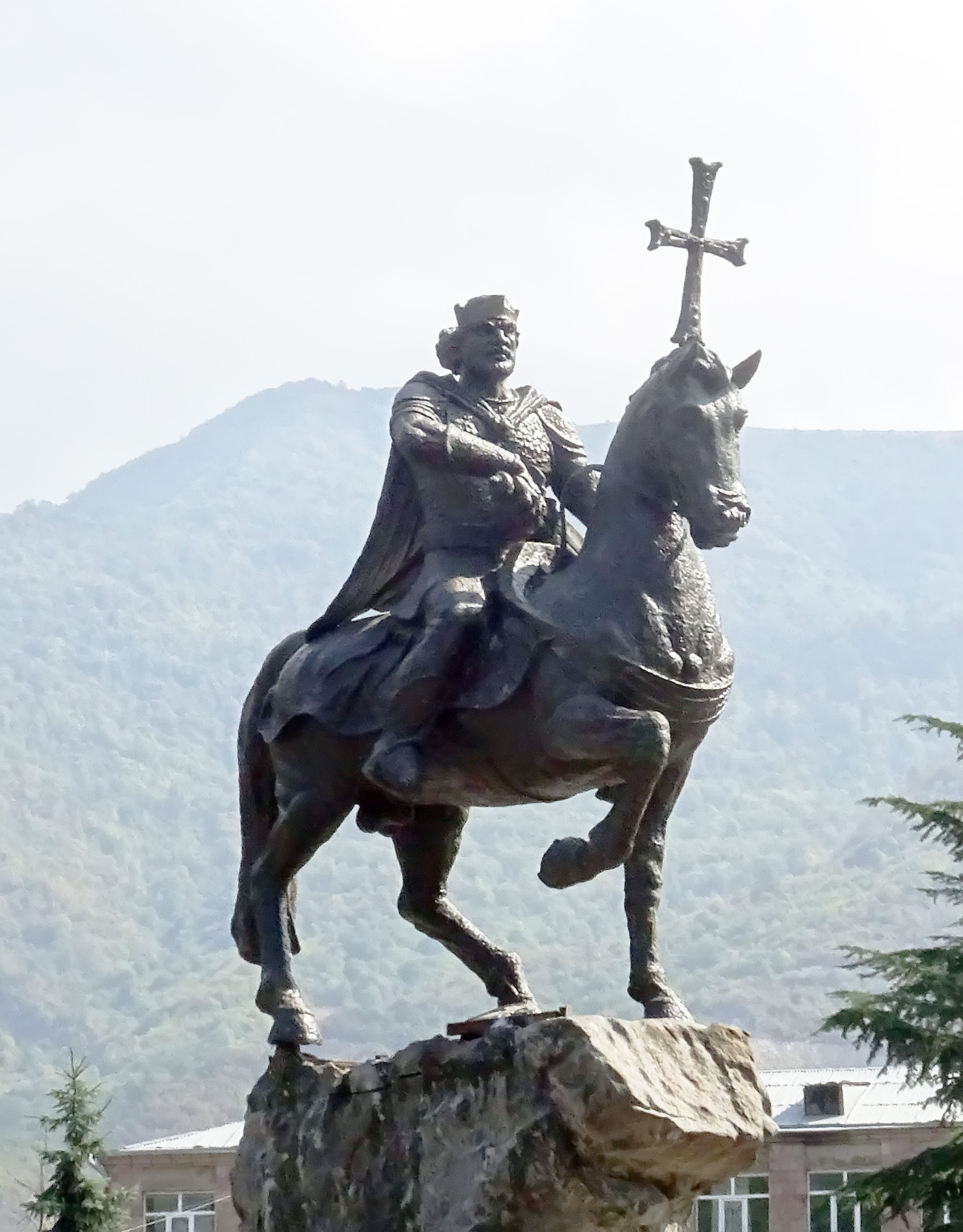
Statue of Ashot II (r. 914–928)

After more than four centuries of dormancy, the Armenian kingdom was restored under the Bagratuni dynasty, from which several presiding princes had hailed. The Abbasid caliphs were prominent supporters of the Bagratuni princes gaining power over other Armenian nobles due to fears of Byzantine influence in the region. In 884, Prince Ashot V Bagratuni was crowned king (as Ashot I) by his peers. Ashot's new position was recognised by both the Byzantine Empire and the Abbasid Caliphate; Emperor Basil I and Caliph Al-Mu'tamid each sent him a royal crown.

- Ashot I "the Great", 884–890, previously prince
- Smbat I "the Martyr", 890–913, son of Ashot I
- Ashot II "the Iron", 914–928, son of Smbat I
  - Ashot of Bagaran, c. 915–920; usurper installed by Yusuf Ibn Abi'l-Saj
- Abas I, 928–953, son of Smbat I
- Ashot III "the Merciful", 953–977, son of Abas I
- Smbat II "the Conqueror", 977–989, son of Ashot III
- Gagik I, 989–1017/1020, son of Ashot III
- Hovhannes-Smbat III, 1017/1020–1040/1041 (in Ani), son of Gagik I
- Ashot IV "the Valiant", 1017/1020–1040/1041 (in Talin), son of Gagik I
- Gargis of Ani (usurper) 1040/1041–1042
- Gagik II, 1042–1045, son of Ashot IV

The Bagratid kingdom and its capital of Ani was conquered by the Byzantine Empire under Emperor Constantine IX Monomachos in 1045.

=== Lesser medieval Armenian kingdoms ===
==== Vaspurakan, Artsruni dynasty (908–1021) ====
The Artsruni family ruled in Vaspurakan as princes under the Bagratuni kings. The Artsruni family revolted after King Smbat ceded some of the Artsruni lands to the nearby princes of Syunik. Shortly thereafter, in 908, Vaspurakan became a separate kingdom with Gagik Artsruni's recognition as a king by Abbasid caliph.

- Gagik Artsruni, 908–937/943
- Derenik-Ashot Artsruni, 937/943–953, son of Gagik
- Abusahl-Hamazasp Artsruni, 953–969/972, son of Gagik
- Ashot-Sahak Artsruni, 969/972–991, son of Abusahl-Hamazasp
- Gurgen-Khachik Artsruni, 991–1003, son of Abusahl-Hamazasp
- Senekerim-Hovhannes Artsruni, 1003–1021, son of Abusahl-Hamazasp

Senekerim-Hovhannes, the last king of Vaspurakan, surrendered his crown to the Byzantine Empire in 1021 under pressure from incursions by the Seljuk Turks and resettled with his family in Cappadocia.

==== Vanand, Bagratuni dynasty (961–1065) ====
The Kingdom of Vanand was created as a vassal state by the Bagratuni kings in 961, ruled by members of their own dynasty.

- Mushegh, 961/962–984, son of Abas I of Armenia
- Abas I, 984–1029, son of Mushegh
- Gagik-Abas II, 1029–1065, son of Abas I; claimed the position of king of all Armenia after the collapse of the main Bagratid kingdom in 1045.

Vanand was ceded to the Byzantine Empire by Gagik-Abas II in 1065.

==== Tashir-Dzoraget, Kiurikian dynasty (982–c. 1145) ====
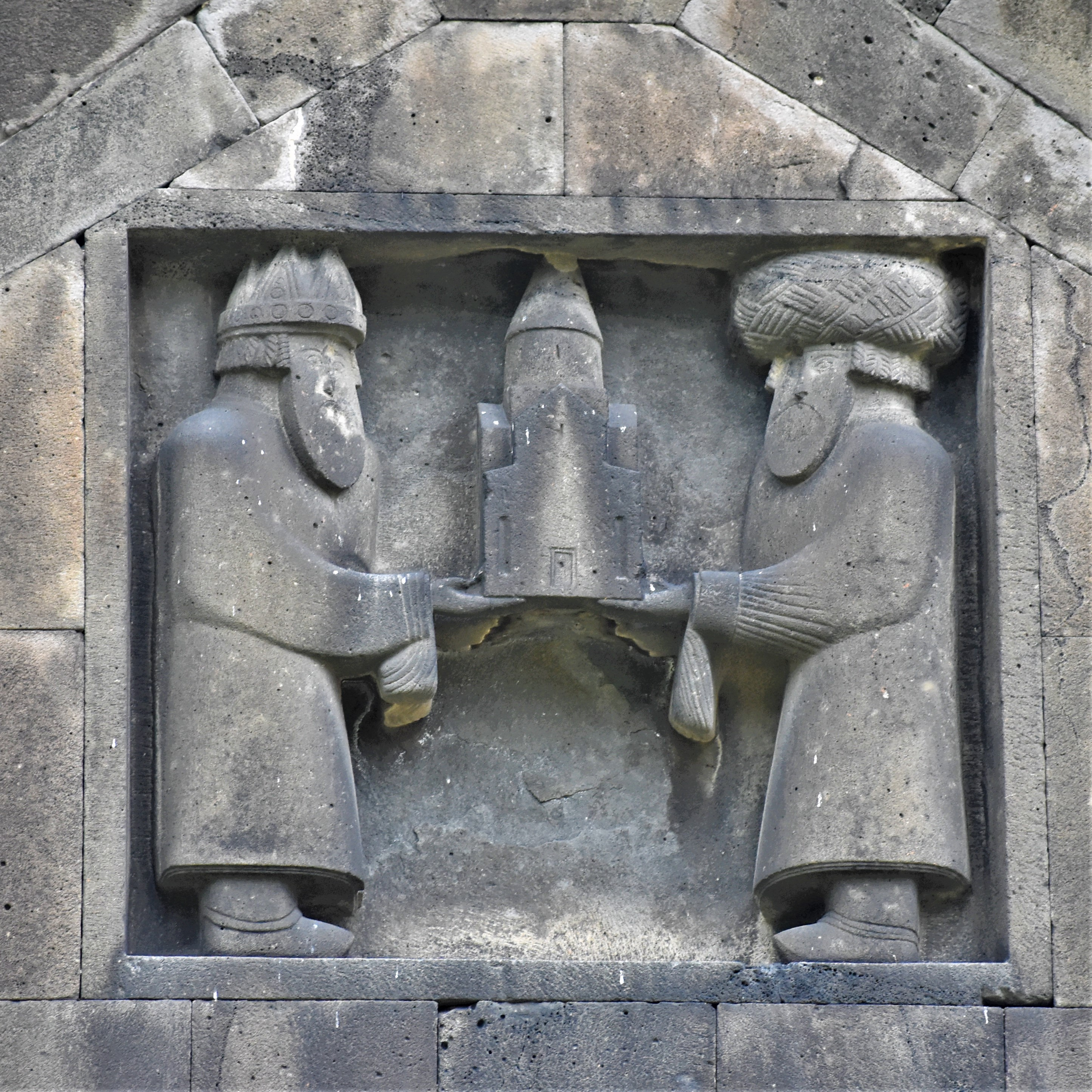
Kiurike I of Tashir-Dzoraget (left, r. 982–989) and Smbat II of Armenia (right, r. 977–989)

The Kingdom of Tashir-Dzoraget was a vassal kingdom founded in 982 by Kiurike I, youngest son of Ashot III of Armenia, and was thereafter ruled by his descendants. It was for most of its history ruled from the fortress of Lori.

- Kiurike I, 982–989, son of Ashot III of Armenia
- David I "the Landless" and Smbat I, 989–1046/1048, sons of Kiurike I
- Kiurike II and Smbat II, 1046/1048–1081/1089, sons of David I
- David II and Abbas I, c. 1089–c. 1145, sons of Kiurike II

After 1145, the family still ruled as lords of Tavouch and Matznaberd

- Kiurike III, c.1145-c.1185, son of David
- Abbas II, c.1185-c.1192, grandson of David.
- Agsartan, c.1192-c.1236, nephew of Abas II
- Kiurike IV, c.1232-c.1236, son of Agsartan
- Pahlavan, c.1236-c.1256, son of Kiurike IV
- Taqiaddin, c.1256-c.1259, son of Kiurike IV

Tashir-Dzoraget was largely conquered by the Seljuk Turks in 1081/1089. In the early 12th century, further conquests led to David II and Abas only retaining control of the fortress of Macnaberd. The kingdom was fully conquered by around 1145, though it is possible that some members of the Kiurikian dynasty retained control of fortresses and settlements in the region thereafter.

==== Syunik, Siunia dynasty (970–1170) ====
The independent Kingdom of Syunik was established under the Siuni prince Smbat Sahak in 970.

- Smbat I Sahak, 970–998
- Vasak, 998–1019, son of Smbat I
- Smbat II, 1019–1044, cousin and nephew of Vasak
- Grigor I, 1044–1084, brother of Smbat II
- Senekerim Sevadian, 1084–1094, adoptive son of Grigor I
- Grigor II, 1094–1166, son of Senekerim
- Hasan of Gerakar, 1166–1170, son-in-law of Grigor II

The Kingdom of Syunik was conquered by the Seljuk Turks in 1170.

== Shah-i Armens (1100–1185; 1420–1437) ==
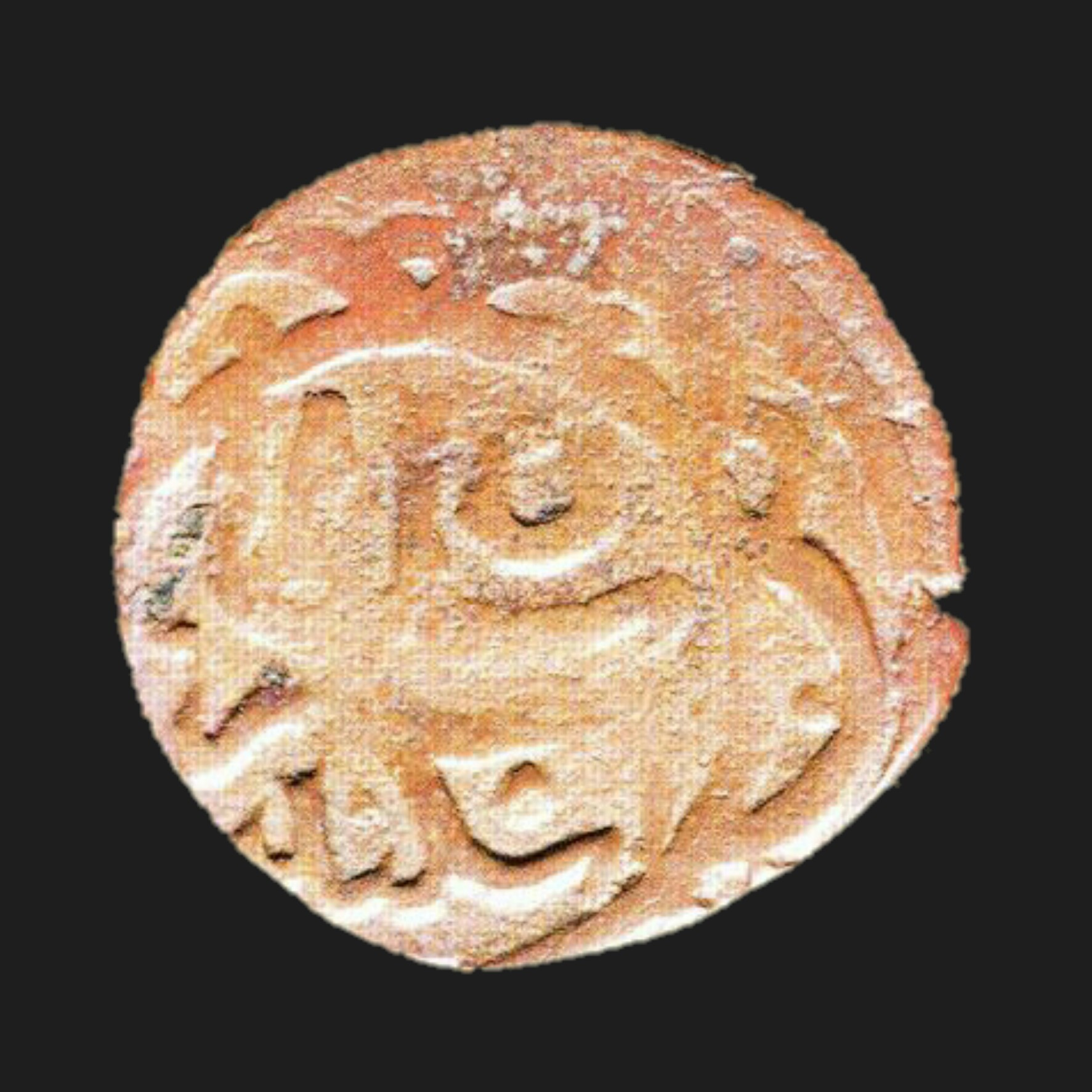
Coin of Qara Iskander, the last Shah-i Armen (r. 1420–1437)

=== Ahlat Shah-i Armens (1100–1185) ===
In the decades following the Battle of Manzikert (1071), one of the Turkmen vassal dynasties of the Seljuk Turks gained control of Ahlat, in the former Armenian heartland. These Muslim emirs took the title Shah-i Armen ("King of the Armenians"); the same title Islamic sources had previously used for the Bagratuni kings.

- Sökmen I, 1100–1111
- Zahireddin Ibrahim, 1111–1127
- Ahmed, 1127
- Sökmen II, 1128–1185

Sökmen II left no heirs, his death in 1185 terminating the Shah-i Armen dynastic line. Ahlat was thereafter ruled by a series of slave emirs; Seyfeddin Bektimur 1185–1193, Bedreddin Aksungur 1193–1198, Sücaeddin Kutlug 1198, Melukülmansur Muhammed 1198–1207, and Izzeddin Balaban 1207. The city's period of relative autonomy came to an end when it was captured by the Ayyubid Sultanate in 1207.

=== Qara Qoyunlu (1420–1437) ===
The title Shah-i Armen was temporarily revived in the 15th century under the rule of the Turkmen Qara Qoyunlu, being used by Sultan Qara Iskander as part of his policy to cultivate the Armenian population.

- Qara Iskander, 1420–1437

== Armenian Kingdom of Cilicia (1080–1375) ==
The Armenian Kingdom of Cilicia was a state formed in the Middle Ages by Armenians who fled the Seljuk invasion of their homeland. It was initially ruled by the Rubenids, an offshoot of the Bagratuni dynasty. While the Rubenid rulers were initially regional princes, their close ties with the Western world after the First Crusade saw the principality recognised as a kingdom under Leo I by the Holy Roman Empire in 1198. The rulers of the Armenian Kingdom of Cilia thereafter styled themselves simply as "King of Armenia".

=== Rubenid dynasty (1080–1252) ===
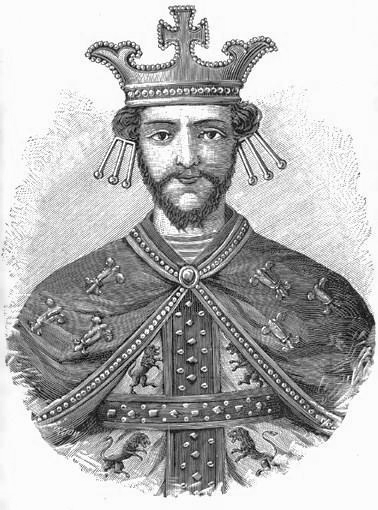
19th-century depiction of Leo I (r. 1198–1219)

- Ruben I, prince 1080–1095
- Constantine I, prince 1095–1099, son of Ruben I
- Thoros I, prince 1100–1129, son of Constantine I
- Leo I, prince 1129–1138, son of Constantine I
  - Interregnum 1138–1145: Cilicia was occupied by the Byzantine Empire
- Thoros II, prince 1145–1169, son of Leo I
- Ruben II, prince 1169–1170, son of Theodore II
- Mleh, prince 1170–1175, son of Leo I
- Ruben III, prince 1175–1186, grandson of Leo I
- Leo I "the Magnificent", prince (as Leo II) 1186–1198 and king 1198–1219, brother of Ruben III
- Isabella, 1219–1252, daughter of Leo I
- Philip of Antioch, 1222–1224, first husband and co-ruler of Isabella

=== Hethumid dynasty (1226–1341) ===
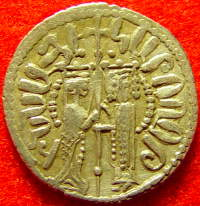
Coin depicting Isabella (r. 1219–1252) and Hethum I (r. 1226–1269)

The Hethumid dynasty gained power through marriage with Isabella of the Rubenid dynasty. Upon her death, her husband Hethum I became sole ruler and he was followed as king by their descendants.

- Hethum I, 1226–1269, second husband of Isabella
- Leo II, 1269–1289, son of Hethum I and Isabella
- Hethum II (first reign), 1289–1293, son of Leo II
- Thoros, 1293–1294, son of Leo II
- Hethum II (second reign), 1294–1296
- Smbat IV, 1296–1298, son of Leo II
- Constantine I, 1298–1299, son of Leo II
- Hethum II (third reign), 1299–1305
- Leo III, 1305–1308, son of Thoros
- Oshin, 1308–1320, son of Leo II
- Leo IV, 1320–1341, son of Oshin

=== Lusignan and Neghir dynasties (1342–1375) ===
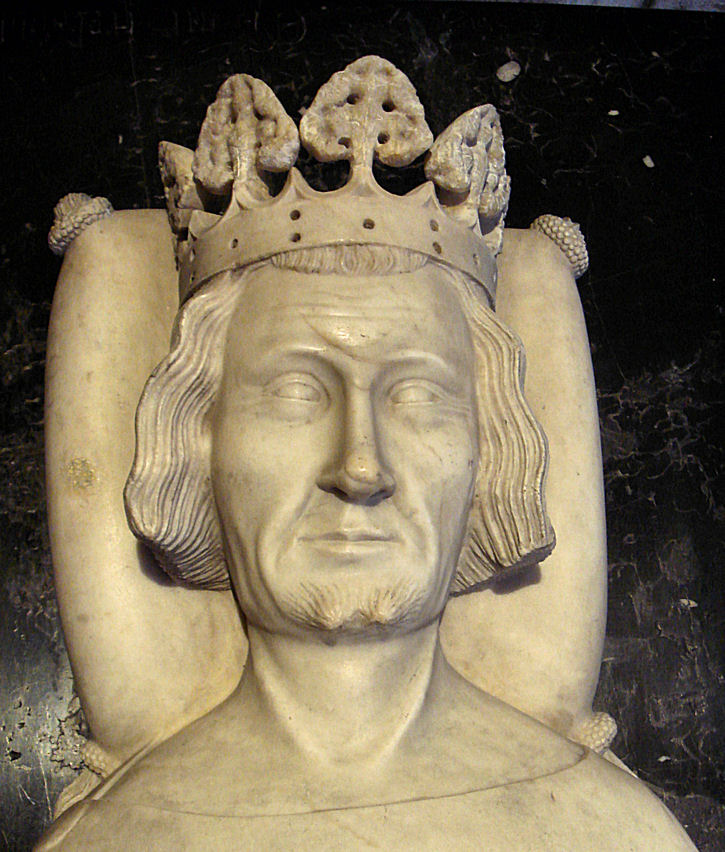
Bust of Leo V, the last King of Armenia (r. 1374–1375)

After the death of Leo IV in 1341, Leo's cousin Guy de Lusignan was elected to succeed him as Constantine II, beginning the rule of the Lusignan dynasty. This dynasty ruled for just over three decades before Cilicia was captured by the Mamluks, bringing an end to the kingdom.

- Constantine II, 1342–1344, cousin and chosen successor of Leo IV (House of Lusignan)
- Constantine III, 1344–1363, elected by the Armenian nobility; grandnephew of Hethum I (House of Neghir)
- Leo (V) "the Usurper", 1363–1365, unknown lineage; seized the throne and then abdicated after a reign of two years
- Constantine IV, 1365–1373, cousin of Constantine III (House of Neghir)
  - Peter de Lusignan, King of Cyprus, was invited to become king by some Armenian barons in 1368 but died in 1369 while making preparations to cross the sea to Cilicia with his forces
- Marie of Korikos, regent 1373–1374, widow of Constantine III and Constantine IV; served as regent while delegations were sent to negotiate with prospective new candidates for the kingship
- Leo V (or VI), 1374–1375, nephew of Constantine II (House of Lusignan)

== Later claimants ==
=== Lusignan claimants (1375–1489) ===
Leo V continued to claim the title "King of Armenia" in exile until his death in 1393. Leo's claims were then inherited by James I, his cousin (both were great-grandsons of the Cypriot king Hugh III) who ruled as King of Cyprus. From 1393 to the end of the Cypriot kingdom in 1489, the rulers of Cyprus claimed the full title "King of Cyprus, Jerusalem and Armenia".

- Leo V, 1375–1393, former king of Armenia
- James I of Cyprus, 1393–1398, distant cousin of Leo V
- Janus of Cyprus, 1398–1432, son of James I
- John II of Cyprus, 1432–1458, son of Janus
- Charlotte of Cyprus, 1458–1464, daughter of John II
- James II of Cyprus, 1464–1473, son of John II
- James III of Cyprus, 1473–1474, son of James II
- Catherine Cornaro, 1474–1489, widow of James II and mother of James III

After the fall of the Kingdom of Cyprus in 1489, Catherine Cornaro sold her claims and titles (including her claim to Armenia) to the Republic of Venice, which at times thereafter advanced a shadowy claim to Cilicia or Armenia as a whole.

=== Savoyard claimants (1485–1946) ===
The House of Savoy claimed the titular style "King of Cyprus, Jerusalem and Armenia" for centuries. It was in use as late as the 20th century, for instance by Victor Emmanuel III of Italy (pictured).

Charlotte, who ruled as Queen of Cyprus 1458–1464, was deposed in 1464 but maintained claims to her titles in exile. In 1485, she ceded all her titular claims to her first cousin once removed, Charles I, Duke of Savoy. As a consequence of Charlotte's sale, the House of Savoy is often seen as the heirs of the Lusignan kings of Cyprus and Armenian Cilicia. For centuries thereafter, the heads of the family maintained the style "Duke of Savoy and titular King of Cyprus, Jerusalem and Armenia".

The title "King of Cyprus, Jerusalem and Armenia" was maintained even after the Savoyard dynasts became kings of Italy, for instance being used by both Victor Emmanuel II and Victor Emmanuel III.

- Charlotte of Cyprus, 1464–1485, former queen of Cyprus
- Charles I, Duke of Savoy, 1485–1490, first cousin once removed of Charlotte, ceded titles
- Charles II, Duke of Savoy, 1490–1496, son of Charles I
- Philip II, Duke of Savoy, 1496–1497, uncle of Charles I
- Philibert II, Duke of Savoy, 1497–1504, son of Philip II
- Charles III, Duke of Savoy, 1504–1553, son of Philip II
- Emmanuel Philibert, Duke of Savoy, 1553–1580, son of Charles III
- Charles Emmanuel I, Duke of Savoy, 1580–1630, son of Emmanuel Philibert
- Victor Amadeus I, Duke of Savoy, 1630–1637, son of Charles Emmanuel I
- Francis Hyacinth, Duke of Savoy, 1637–1638, son of Victor Amadeus I
- Charles Emmanuel II, Duke of Savoy, 1638–1675, son of Victor Amadeus I
- Victor Amadeus II of Sardinia, 1675–1730, son of Charles Emmanuel II
- Charles Emmanuel III of Sardinia, 1730–1773, son of Victor Amadeus II
- Victor Amadeus III of Sardinia, 1773–1796, son of Charles Emmanuel III
- Charles Emmanuel IV of Sardinia, 1796–1802, son of Victor Amadeus III
- Victor Emmanuel I of Sardinia, 1802–1821, son of Victor Amadeus III
- Charles Felix of Sardinia, 1821–1831, son of Victor Amadeus III
- Charles Albert of Sardinia, 1831–1849, great-great-grandson of Victor Amadeus I
- Victor Emmanuel II of Italy, 1849–1878, son of Charles Albert
- Umberto I of Italy, 1878–1900, son of Victor Emmanuel II
- Victor Emmanuel III of Italy, 1900–1946, son of Umberto I
- Umberto II of Italy, 1946, son of Victor Emmanuel III

== See also ==
- List of Armenian royal consorts
- History of Armenia
- List of catholicoi of all Armenians
