= Constance, Queen of Cyprus and Armenia =

Queen consort of Cyprus (1304/6–1344)

Constance of Sicily

Queen consort of Cyprus Queen consort of Jerusalem
- Tenure: 16 October 1317 – 31 March 1324

Queen consort of Armenia
- Tenure: 29 December 1331 – 28 December 1341
- Born: 1304/1306
- Died: After 19 June 1344
- Spouses: Henry II of Cyprus; Leo IV, King of Armenia; John of Cyprus
- House: House of Barcelona
- Father: Frederick III of Sicily
- Mother: Eleanor of Anjou

Constance of Sicily (Italian: Costanza, 1304/1306 – after 19 June 1344) was Queen of Cyprus and Jerusalem by marriage to Henry II of Cyprus and Queen of Armenia by marriage to Leo IV of Armenia.

== Life ==
Constance was the daughter of Frederick III of Sicily and Eleanor of Anjou. Her siblings included Elizabeth, Duchess of Bavaria, Peter II of Sicily, Manfred of Athens and William II of Athens.

Constance was originally betrothed to Prince Robert, youngest son of Philip IV of France and Joan I of Navarre. The engagement was broken when Robert died young in the summer of 1308. King Philip sent Constance's father a letter announcing the news. An excerpt from the letter:

"We are sure that your Majesty knows that the complicated negotiation about the intended marriage of the Princess Constance and our most beloved son Robert was designed to nurture perpetual peace and create an indissoluble union between our Royal Houses. But see, with what intense bitterness of heart we have to tell you this, destructive Death has lamentably snatched from us our son, whom we loved best of all. No fellow human being could be surprised if we were inwardly desolated by the sting of this bitter grief. But we give thanks to God that one of our own family, free of all stain, whom we have loved with our life, has been sent to Heaven."

=== Queen consort of Cyprus and Jerusalem ===
Constance was married on 16 October 1317 to Henry II of Cyprus and Jerusalem, who was son of Hugh III of Cyprus. He was more than 30 years older than her. By this marriage Constance was Queen consort of Cyprus and Jerusalem. They were married for seven years until 31 March 1324 when Henry died. They had no children.

=== Queen consort of Armenia ===
On 29 December 1331 Constance married her second husband Leo IV, King of Armenia. The papal dispensation was issued the same day. Leo was strongly pro-Western because he favoured a union of the Armenian and Roman churches, which deeply displeased the native barons. His marriage to Constance further aroused anti-Western sentiment and anti-Catholic sentiment in Armenia. Constance was Leo's second wife, as his first wife Alice of Korikos and her father Oshin were murdered on Leo's orders because Oshin had murdered Leo's aunt Princess Isabella to remove her from possibly inheriting Armenia. In Armenia, Constance was frequently ill, suffering from constant coughing, fatigue, and dizziness. The King also neglected her, and all of her pregnancies ended in miscarriage.

On 28 December 1341 Leo was murdered by his own barons. It was the day before the couple's tenth wedding anniversary. They had no surviving children.

=== Later life ===
Constance married her third and final husband John of Lusignan in 1343. This marriage was also childless. Constance's illness worsened and she died sometime after 19 June 1344, at the age of about 40.

== Sources ==
- Stopka, Krzysztof (2016). Armenia Christiana: Armenian Religious Identity and the Churches of Constantinople and Rome (4th-15th Century). Jagiellonian University Press.
- Edbury, Peter W. (2005). "Franks". In Konnari, Angel Nicolaou; Schabel, Christopher David (eds.). Cyprus: Society And Culture 1191-1374. Brill. pp. 63–102.

Constance of Sicily House of Barcelona Cadet branch of the House of Barcelona Born: circa. 1307 Died: after 19 June 1344
Royal titles
Vacant Title last held by Isabella of Ibelin	Queen consort of Cyprus; 1317–1324	Succeeded by Alix of Ibelin
Vacant Title last held by Alice of Korikos	Queen consort of Armenia; 1331–1341	Vacant Title next held by Theodora Syrgiannaina
