= Marie of Korikos =

Queen consort of Armenia (1344-1373)

Marie of Korikos (1321 – before 1405) served as the queen consort of Armenia from 1344–1363 and 1365–1373 through marriage to the kings Constantine III and Constantine IV, respectively.

After her second husband's death in 1373, she served as the penultimate ruler of the Armenian Kingdom of Cilicia, governing what little remained of the kingdom as regent from April 1373 to the election and coronation of Constantine's successor Leo V on 14 September 1374.

== Life ==
Marie's maternal grandparents were Philip I, Prince of Taranto and his first wife Thamar Angelina Komnene. Philip was son of Charles II of Naples and his wife Maria of Hungary.

Marie's paternal grandparents were Hayton of Corycus and Isabella of Ibelin, daughter of Guy of Ibelin and Maria of Armenia, herself daughter of Isabella, Queen of Armenia and her second husband Hethum I, King of Armenia.

Marie's father had previously been married to Margaret of Ibelin and had a daughter, her half-sister Alice of Korikos, who married Leo IV, King of Armenia but was murdered by him in 1329 along with Marie's father who had acted as regent but had killed various members of the Armenian royal family.

=== Queen of Armenia ===
==== Queen consort, 1344–1373 ====
Marie married her first husband in 1340, Constantine III, King of Armenia. From this marriage she became Queen consort.

Both sons died in childhood and neither succeeded their father. They are named by their father in a contemporary manuscript which records a donation to the convent of Sis in memory of his sons Oshin and Lewon.

After her husband's death on December 21, 1362, he was eventually succeeded by his cousin Constantine IV, King of Armenia. Maria married the new King of Armenia but they had no children. Maria died before 1405.

Constantine IV was a weak and unpopular ruler. His reign saw the dwindling of Armenian domains in Cilicia to consist of little more than a narrow coastal stretch around the city of Sis. By the end of his reign, the Armenians retained control of only the city's citadel. The Armenians hoped to find a possible successor to the throne that would connect them to Cyprus and Western Europe, thus securing support and aid. They first sent a delegation to the Cypriote prince Leo de Lusignan, nephew of the former king Constantine II, though he rejected the proposal. When the delegation returned in April 1373, Constantine IV was assassinated.

==== Queen regent, 1373–1374 ====
Upon the death of Constantine IV, an heir not yet having been chosen, Marie became regent of what remained of the kingdom.

Further delegations continued to be sent in search for a possible king. The Armenian nobles still desired to make Leo their king and sent a delegation to Peter II of Cyprus to ask for his approval of Leo's succession to the throne. Peter refused since he desired the Armenian throne for himself. Shortly thereafter, Leo nevertheless arrived in Armenia, accompanied by a tiny army to Sis. He reached the capital on 26 July 1374 and was crowned on 14 September, ending Marie's regency.

== Issue ==
With Constantine III, King of Armenia:

- Oshin (d. 1356), died young
- Lewon (1338 – before 1357), died young

== Bibliography ==
- T.S.R. Boase, editor. The Cilician Kingdom of Armenia. Scottish Academic Press, 1978.
