= Isabella of Armenia (disambiguation) =

Isabella of Armenia (died c. 1252) ruled the Armenian Kingdom of Cilicia from 1219 to 1252, married to Hetoum I.

Isabella of Armenia or Sibylla of Armenia may also refer to:

- Sibylla of Armenia (1240–1290), daughter of Queen Isabella and King Hetoum I
- Isabella of Armenia, Princess of Tyre (died c. 1321), daughter of Leo III of Armenia, wife of Amalric of Jerusalem
