= King Guy (disambiguation) =

King Guy can refer to:

- Guy III of Spoleto, King of Italy in 889 and Holy Roman Emperor in 891 until his death in 894
- Guy of Lusignan, King of Jerusalem 1186–1192, King of Cyprus 1192–1194
- Constantine II, King of Armenia, born Guy de Lusignan, from 1342–1344
