= Constantine of Baberon =

Armenian noble

- Died: 1263
- Noble family: Het‛umid
- Spouses: Stephanie of Barbaron; Alix Pahlavouni; Biatr
- Issue: Stephanie of Lampron; Sempad the Constable; Hethum I of Armenia; Ochine of Korykos; John, Bishop of Sis; Lewon; Maria; Hripsimeh; Yovhanes, Archbishop of Sis; Vacahk, lord of Gantschi; Licos; Daughter; Kostandin
- Father: Vassag

Constantine of Baberon (Armenian: Կոստանդին Գունդստաբլ; died c. 1263) was a powerful Armenian noble of the Het‛umid family. He was the son of Vassag and the father of King Het‛um I, who ruled the Armenian Kingdom of Cilicia from 1226 to 1270. Constantine played a pivotal role in placing his son on the throne by engineering the murder of Philip, the husband of Isabella, Queen of Armenia. He tricked Philip's father, Bohemond IV of Antioch, to search for his son at Amouda rather than at Sis, where he was being tortured and poisoned. He then took his army to the gates of Silifke Castle, forced its Frankish lords to surrender Isabella, and arranged the marriage, making his son the first Het‛umid ruler of the Armenian Kingdom.

Constantine began construction on the elaborate baronial apartments at Baberon (Çandır Castle), which were still standing in 1979. Nearby, at a site known today as Kız Kilisesi near Gösne, he built a monastic retreat with an ornate chapel whose dedicatory inscription is dated to 1241.

The Castle of Tamrut, about 75 km northeast of Baberon, also had an Armenian dedicatory inscription (now destroyed) over its main gate which mentioned having been built in memory of "the father of the King… Baron Constantine." It also gave the medieval Armenian name of the castle as Tambrout, a name otherwise unattested in the surviving histories, and the year of construction as 1253.

Constantine, also known as the Grand Baron Constantine, was married to Stephanie of Barbaron, with whom he had Stephanie of Lampron, married in 1237 to King Henry I of Cyprus.

In 1205, he married Alix Pahlavouni (a third-cousin of Leo II), with whom he fathered:

- Sempad the Constable 1208–1276
- Hethum I of Armenia 1213–1270
- Ochine of Korykos, father of the historian Hayton of Corycus
- John (Basil), the Bishop of Sis
- Lewon (Leon)
- Maria, who married John of Ibelin, Count of Jaffa and Ascalon, the famous jurist
- Hripsimeh (Daisy)

In his third marriage, Constantin married Biatr around 1220, who gave birth to:

- Yovhanes, Bishop of Mavleon, then Archbishop of Sis
- Vacahk, lord of Gantschi
- Licos
- a daughter married to Simon Mansel, Constable of Antioch
- Kostandin, Lord of Neghir and Perzerpert (Partzerpert), ancestor of Kings Constantine III and Constantine IV.
