= Jean Dardel =

French historian

Jean Dardel was a Friar Minor of the French province of the Franciscan order, chronicler of Armenia in the fourteenth century, and adviser and confessor to King Leo V (or VI) of Armenia. Nothing is known regarding him except what he himself tells us in his Chronique d'Arménie, a work unknown until the late 19th century.

== Biography ==
Dardel was born in Étampes, near Paris, and became a Franciscan about the middle of the 14th century. Not earlier than 1375 he went with other pilgrims to Jerusalem and Mount Sinai. Arriving at Cairo he found the unhappy Leo, last King of Armenia (Cilicia), who after a nine-months siege in the fortress of Gaban was made prisoner by the Emir of Aleppo and brought to Jerusalem: and from there sent, together with his family, to Cairo (July, 1375).

In Cairo Dardel accepted the invitation of the imprisoned monarch to act as his adviser, confessor, and secretary. With Dardel was a companion named Brother Anthony da Monopoli. Dardel saw the king frequently and said Mass before him, a privilege easily obtained from the sultan. He remained in Cairo till 1379, and, as he tells us, wrote some of the letters which the king sent to Europe seeking to procure his freedom. Eventually King Leo entrusted him with his royal seal and letters of credence, and sent him as ambassador to King Peter IV of Aragon, and, failing success with him, to all the other kings of Christendom to obtain his freedom. Dardel and his companion, Brother Anthony, set out from Cairo on 11 September 1379, and reached Barcelona on 1 March 1380. After travelling over half of Europe he barely succeeded in inducing the King of Aragon to send an embassy with gifts to the sultan. Under the leadership of the pilgrim Gian-Alfonso di Loric, with some support from King John I of Castile, the release of King Leo was thus secured, and he arrived in Venice on 12 December 1382. He set out for France, paid homage there to Clement VII (the antipope), and then went on to Spain where the King of Castile received him royally.

Clement VII appointed Dardel Bishop of Tortiboli in the Kingdom of Naples on 11 April 1383, as a reward for his labours on behalf of the Armenian king. He left a Chronique d'Arménie, for a long time unknown to Orientalists. It was discovered by Canon Ulysse Robert, who came across the manuscript in the Library of Dole in France, and it was published at the turn of the 20th century by the Institut des belles lettres of France in the second volume of the Recueil des Historiens des Croisades.
