= Alice of Korikos =

Queen consort of Armenia
- Tenure: 10 August 1321 - 1329
- Died: 1329
- Spouse: Leo IV, King of Armenia
- Issue: Hethum of Armenia
- House: Hethumids
- Father: Oshin of Korikos
- Mother: Margaret of Ibelin

Alice of Korikos (died 1329) was Queen of Armenia by marriage to Leo IV, King of Armenia. She was the only daughter of Oshin of Korikos and his first wife Margaret of Ibelin.

On the death of Oshin, King of Armenia, Alice's father became regent for the minor Leo IV, King of Armenia. Alice's father wanted to make his position more powerful. In order to do this he married Joan of Taranto, widow of King Oshin and he forced Alice to marry the young King Leo, in the hope they would one day produce a son and heir for Armenia. They married around 31 December 1320 and the Papal Dispensation for the marriage was dated 10 August 1321.

More steps were taken to confirm Oshin's security. At some time between 1320 and 1323, Isabella of Armenia, Princess of Tyre, sister of King Oshin, along with her son Henri, were imprisoned and murdered by Alice's father. Oshin wanted to reduce the number of claimants to the throne of the Cilician Kingdom. It was rumoured that Oshin poisoned Isabella to remove her from the line of inheritance.

Alice is known to have born Leo one child, a son called Hethum who died around 1331. He did not inherit Armenia from his father due to his premature death.

The treatment Leo meted out to his regent upon reaching his majority in 1329 was violent. Oshin and his brother Constantine, Constable of Armenia were murdered. Leo even had his wife Alice murdered to end all of Oshin's plans. He dispatched the head of Oshin to the Ilkhan and that of Constantine to Al-Nasr Muhammad.

After he had Alice murdered, Leo took the opportunity to remarry to a western princess, Constance of Sicily; however, they had no children.

== Bibliography ==
- Boase, T. S. R. (1978). The Cilician Kingdom of Armenia. Edinburgh: Scottish Academic Press. ISBN 0-7073-0145-9.

Alice of Korikos Hethumids Born: circa. ? Died: circa. 1329
Royal titles
Vacant Title last held by Joan of Taranto	Queen consort of Armenia; 1321–1329	Vacant Title next held by Constance of Sicily
