= Leo the Usurper =

King of Armenian Cilicia from 1362/1363 to 1365

Leo (V)
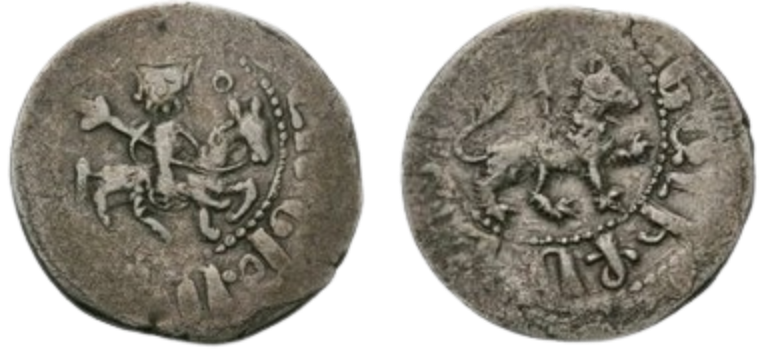
- Silver coin of Leo. Obv: Equestrian king riding right; sceptre in the hand. Circle in the field. Here you can read: [ԼԵ]ՎՈՆ ԹԱ[ԳԱԻՈՐ ՀԱՅՈՑ] (Levon king of the Armenians). Rev: Lion walking right with a cross behind him. Here you can read: [ՇԻՆ]ԵԱԼ Ի ՔԱ[ՂԱՔՆ Ի ՍԻՍ] (Struck in the city of Sis).

King of Armenia
- Reign: 1362/1363–1365
- Predecessor: Constantine III
- Successor: Constantine IV

Leo the Usurper, sometimes enumerated as Leo V or Levon V was a king of the Armenian Kingdom of Cilicia from 1362/1363 to 1365. It would seem that he usurped the throne immediately after Constantine III's death in 1362 but it could have started even later during Constantine IV's reign in 1363.

He came from unknown lineage and reigned for approximately 2 to 3 years before abdicating and disappearing from sources.
