= Ashot of Bagaran =

Ashot of Bagaran Բագարանի Աշոտ
- King of Armenia; Sparapet

King of Armenia
- Reign: 914–936
- Predecessor: Ashot II
- Successor: Ashot II
- Died: 936; Bagaran
- Dynasty: Bagratuni
- Father: Schapuh Bagratuni

Ashot of Bagaran (died 936) was a member of the Bagratuni dynasty who briefly reigned as King of Armenia from 914 to 936, in rivalry with his cousin Ashot II.

His uncle, King Smbat I, appointed him sparapet or commander-in-chief of the kingdom a tittle previously held by his own father. Following Smbat's death by torture by Yusuf, the emir of Azerbaijan, Yusuf, then at war with the new king Ashot II, incited Ashot to rebel.

== Biography ==
Ashot is the son of Shapuh, Sparapet of Armenia who died in 912, himself the son of King Ashot I. When Yusuf invaded in 909, Ashot left his uncle Smbat and went over to the emir, together with other leading princes.

Yusuf attempted a revolt against the caliph (he was apparently very hostile towards the caliph) but was captured and held prisoner by the caliph from 919 to 922. During Yusuf's absence, many territories that had previously paid tribute to him or were directly dependent on him submitted to Ashot II, who gradually recovered the territories that did not obey him; the strongest resistance he encountered was in Kolb, where there was a Sajid garrison. This garrison obeyed to Ashot of Bagaran whose territory had its centers in Bagaran and Kolb, north and south of the confluence of the Akhurean River with the Araxes. During the royal attack on Kolb, Ashot was in Dvin and the Sajid council decided to crown him king of Armenia. It is also said that it was perhaps Yusuf himself acting on behalf of the Caliph that bestowed the royal title and crown upon Ashot at Dvin in 914. Yusuf held Ashot's mother and sisters in Persia as hostages. Ashot II came back from Constantinople with a Byzantine army in 915, but his cousin kept Dvin.

The defeat of the Armenians at Kolb finally incited Ashot to fight against the king. He asked for an alliance from Simbatsi, Ixkhan of Eastern Siunia (who held Vayots Dzor as his main fief) and his three brothers Isaac, Bagben (lord of Shusha or Balkh) and Vasaces, but they all preferred to stay loyal to Ashot II the Iron. Catholicos Hovhannes V managed to achieve a truce in the struggle. This conflict, known as the "war of the two Ashots", lasted from 918 to 920.

In 923, Ashot II decided to go to Azerbaijan and pay homage to Yusuf. Yusuf recognized him and gave him back the royal crown. He gave him permission to subdue Ashot of Bagaran, who was in Dvin. Ashot II attacked Dvin but was forced to retreat with heavy losses. Hovhannes V then had to arrange a third truce.

The king then traveled to the Kingdom of Abkhazia where George II gave him contingents to compensate for the losses from the Dvin attack. However, as Ashot of Bagaran lost the support of the Sajids, he eventually ceased to pose a threat.

Then, Ashot II managed to secure aid from Constantinople and, leading a detachment of Byzantine auxiliaries, fought and subdued Ashot in 920.

In the end, the king spared his life, and Ashot retired to his estates in Bagaran while retaining the royal title where he died in 936, a few years after Ashot II's own death.

== Bibliography ==
- René Grousset, L'Empire du Levant : Histoire de la Question d'Orient, Paris, Payot, coll. « Bibliothèque historique », 1949 (réimpr. 1979), 648 p. (ISBN 978-2-228-12530-7), p. 136
- (en) Charles Cawley, « Armenia », sur Medieval Lands, Foundation for Medieval Genealogy, 2006–2025.
