= John (constable of Armenia) =

Nobleman (d. 1343)

- Died: 7 August 1343
- Spouse: Soldane Bagrationi of Georgia
- Issue: Leo V, King of Armenia
- House: Poitiers-Lusignan
- Father: Amalric, Lord of Tyre
- Mother: Isabella of Armenia

John (died 7 August 1343) of the House of Lusignan was the constable and later regent of the Armenian Kingdom of Cilicia.

John was son of Amalric, Lord of Tyre, and Isabella of Armenia. His siblings were Guy (Constantine II, King of Armenia) and Agnes, wife of Leo III, King of Armenia.

John married Soldane Bagrationi, daughter of king George V of Georgia. The couple had:

- Leo V (1342–1393), king of Lesser Armenia (1374–1375), married Marguerite de Soissons.

John was murdered in Cilicia on 7 August 1343.

== Sources ==
- Runciman, Steven (1999). A History of the Crusades. Vol. III: The Kingdom of Acre and the Later Crusades. Cambridge University Press.
