= Leo IV of Armenia =

King of Armenia from 1320 to 1341

Leo IV Լևոն Դ
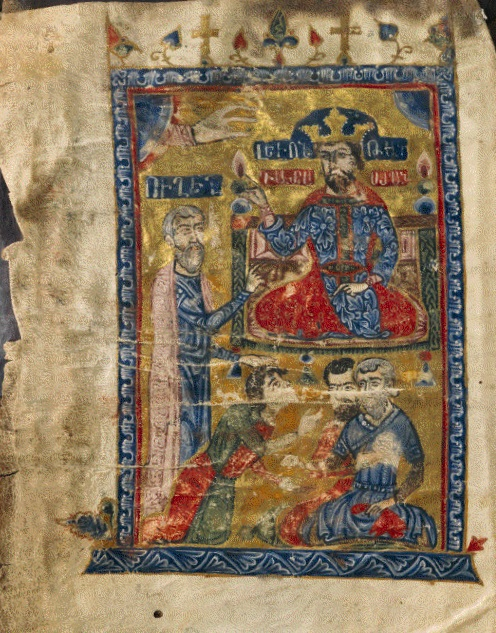
- King Levon IV doing justice by Sarkis Pitzak, 1331

King of Armenia
- Reign: 1320 – August 28, 1341
- Predecessor: Oshin of Armenia
- Successor: Constantine II
- Regent: Oshin of Korikos (until 1329)
- Born: 1309
- Died: August 28, 1341 (aged 31–32)
- Spouse: Alice of Korikos; Constance of Sicily
- Issue: Hethum
- House: Hethumids
- Father: Oshin of Armenia
- Mother: Isabel of Korikos

Leo IV or Leon IV (Armenian: Լեւոն Դ, Levon IV) (also numbered Leo V) (1309 – August 28, 1341) was the last Hethumid king of Cilicia, ruling from 1320 until his death. He was the son of Oshin of Armenia and Isabel of Korikos, and came to the throne on the death of his father. His name is sometimes spelled as Leo or Leon.

He spent his minority under the regency of Oshin of Korikos. During this period, the kingdom was much harassed by Mamluks and Mongols. In 1320, the Egyptian sultan Naser Mohammed ibn Kelaoun invaded and ravaged Christian Armenian Cilicia. In a letter dated July 1, 1322, and sent from Avignon, Pope John XXII reminded Mongol ruler Abu Sa'id Bahadur Khan of the alliance of his ancestors with Christians, asking him to intervene in Cilicia. At the same time he advocated that he abandon Islam in favor of Christianity. Mongol troops were sent to Cilicia to support the Armenians, but only arrived after a ceasefire had been negotiated for 15 years between Constantin, patriarch of the Armenians, and the sultan of Egypt.

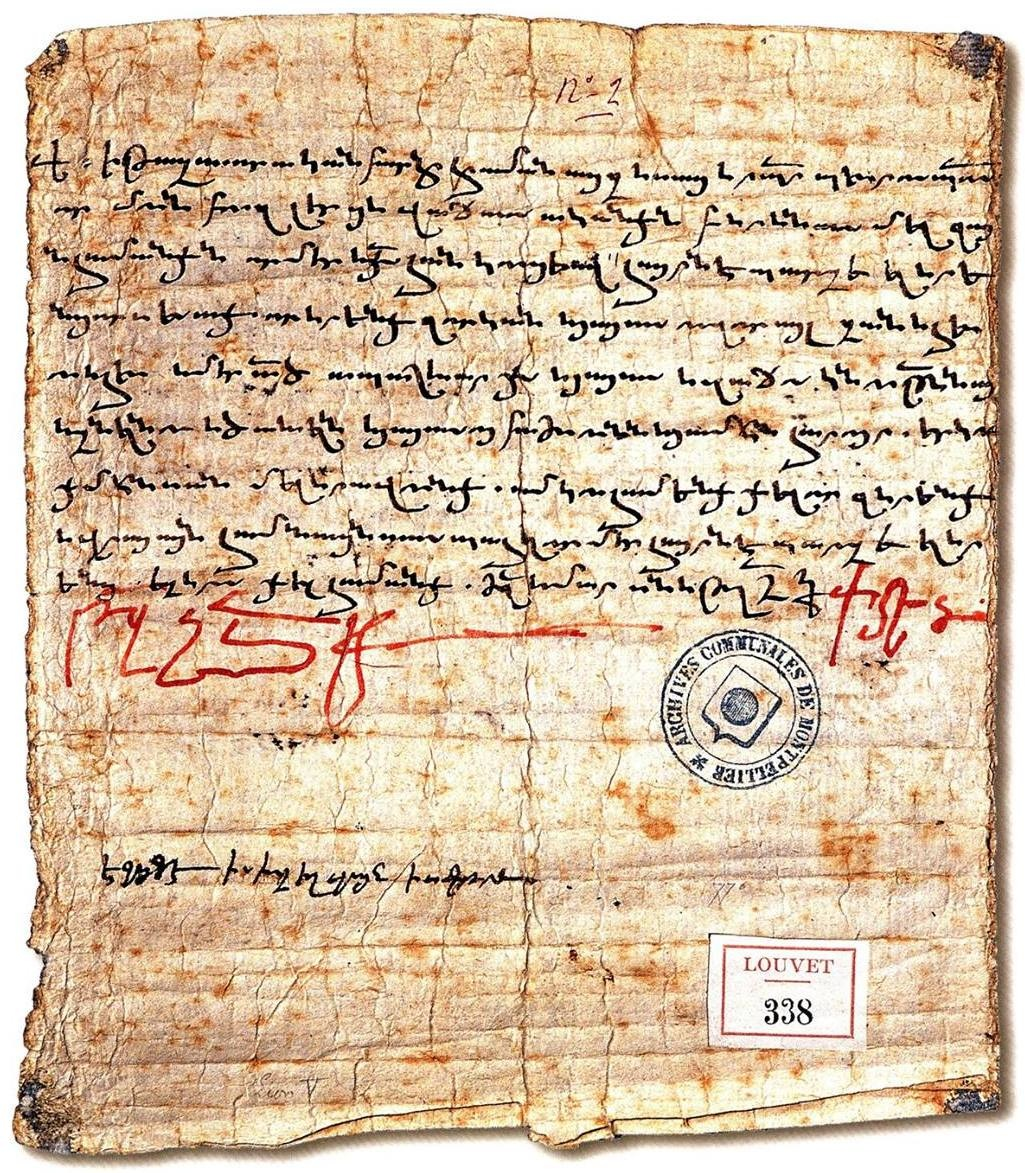
Privilege dated 16 March 1321 granted by the Cilician Armenian King Leo IV to the merchants of Montpellier.

The regent Oshin had married his stepmother, Joan of Taranto, and Leo was forced to marry Alice Oshin's daughter by his first wife, Margaret d'Ibelin, on August 10, 1321. Oshin murdered a number of members of the royal family to consolidate his own power, and Leo's reaction upon reaching his majority in 1329 was violent. Oshin, his brother Constantine, Constable of Armenia and Lord of Lampron, and Leo's wife Alice were all murdered on the king's orders, Oshin's head being sent to the Il-Khan and Constantine's head to Al-Nasir Muhammad, Sultan of Egypt. Leo had his aunt Isabella, wife of the late Amalric, Lord of Tyre, and two of her sons imprisoned and then executed.

Leo was strongly pro-Western and favored a union of the Armenian and Roman Churches, which deeply displeased the native barons. His second marriage on December 29, 1331 to Constance, daughter of Frederick III of Sicily and Eleanor of Anjou, widow of Henry II of Cyprus, further aroused anti-Western sentiment.

In 1337, Al-Nasir Muhammad invaded again, taking the city of Ayas, and Leo was forced to conclude a humiliating truce, surrendering territory and a large indemnity and promising to have no dealings with the West. He spent the last years of his reign holed up in the citadel at Sis, hoping for Western aid which never came. On August 28, 1341 he was murdered by his own barons. His only son by Alice, Hethum, had died before 1331; the barons elected his cousin Constantine II to succeed him.

== Sources ==
- Boase, T. S. R. (1978). The Cilician Kingdom of Armenia. Edinburgh: Scottish Academic Press. ISBN 0-7073-0145-9.
- Ghazarian, Jacob G (2000). The Armenian Kingdom in Cilicia during the Crusades: The Integration of Cilician Armenians with the Latins (1080–1393). Abingdon: RoutledgeCurzon (Taylor & Francis Group). ISBN 0-7007-1418-9.
- Stopka, Krzysztof (2016). Armenia Christiana: Armenian Religious Identity and the Churches of Constantinople and Rome. Jagiellonian University Press.

Leo IV of Armenia House of Lambron
Regnal titles
Preceded by Oshin	King of Armenia; 1320–1341	Succeeded by Constantine II
