= Hayton of Corycus =

Armenian noble and historian (c. 1240 – c. 1310/1320)

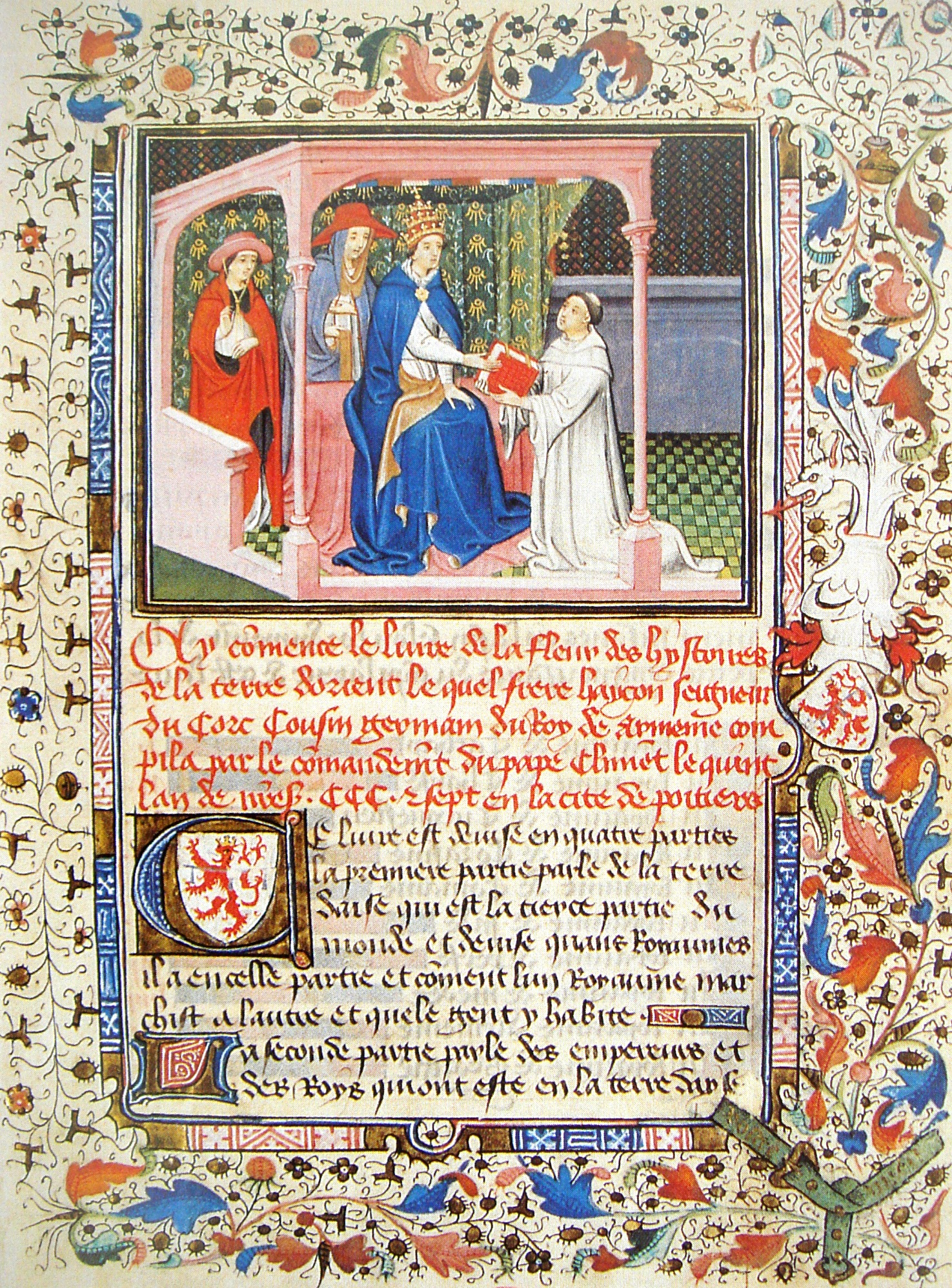
An image from Hayton's work La Flor des Estoires, shows Hayton remitting his report on the Mongols to Pope Clement V in 1307.

Hayton of Corycus, O.Praem (also Hethum, Het'um, and variants; Armenian: Հեթում Պատմիչ, romanized: Hetʿowm Patmičʿ, lit. 'Hethum the Historian'; c. 1240 – c. 1310/1320) was a medieval Armenian nobleman and historiographer. He was also a member of Norbertines and likely a Catholic priest.

Hayton is the author of La Flor des estoires de la terre d'Orient ("Flower of the Histories of the East"; Latin: Flos historiarum terre Orientis), a historiographical work about the history of Asia, especially about the Muslim conquests and the Mongol invasion, which he dictated at the request of Pope Clement V in 1307, while he was at Poitiers. The Old French original text was recorded by one Nicolas Faulcon, who also prepared a Latin translation. The work was widely disseminated in the Late Middle Ages and was influential in shaping western European views of the Orient.

== Biography ==
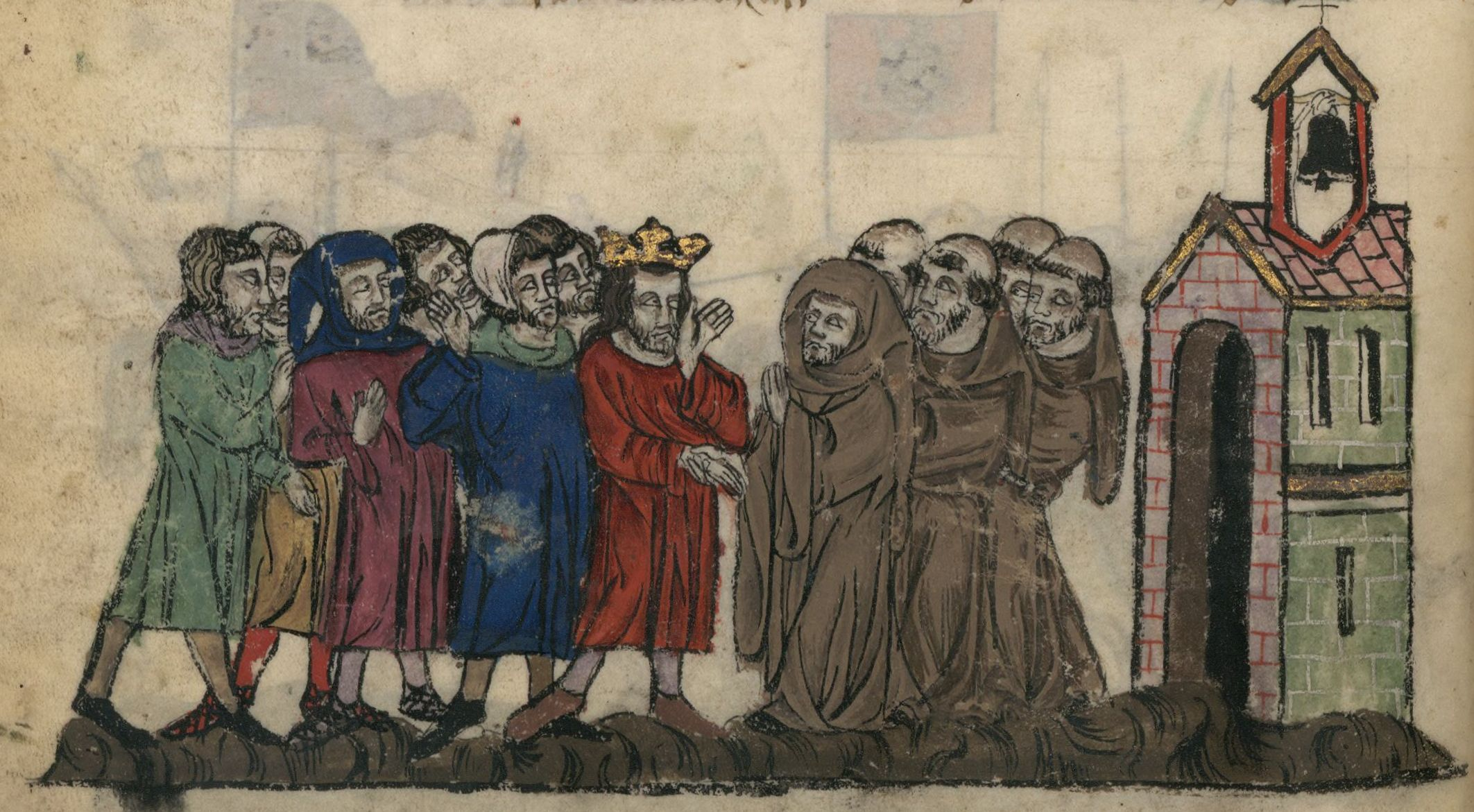
King Hethum I of Armenia entering Drazark monastery in 1270, the final year of his life.

Likely born between c. 1230 and 1245, a member of the influential Armenian Hethumid dynasty in Armenian Kingdom of Cilicia, Hayton was the son of Oshin (d. 15 January 1265), Prince of Corycus (Korikos), and younger brother of King Hethum I (d. 28 October 1270) and Sempad the Constable (Armenian: Sparapet), the chronicler and kingdom's constable (d. 1276). When he came of age, he was made governor of the city of Corycus.

Cypriot chronology suggests that Hayton was forced into exile in 1294 because he conspired against his younger cousin, King Hethum II. In 1299, he made a pilgrimage to Paris to fulfill a Marian vow.

In 1305, Hayton joined the Premonstratensian Order at Bellapais Abbey in Cyprus and presumably was ordained a Catholic priest. This was in line with his family's policy of a union between the Roman and Armenian Churches. By 1307, he was in Poitiers, the main residence of Pope Clement V, as prior of the Premonstratensian abbey there. It was here that he dictated his History at the request of the pope. His political aim in Poitiers was to gain support for Amalric of Tyre in his usurpation of the throne of Cyprus against the unpopular king Henry II of Cyprus, and to advocate for a new crusade in alliance with the Mongols.

After the assassination of Hethum II in 1307, Hayton returned to Cilician Armenia, where, leaving his monastic life behind, he became constable, commander of the armed forces. The date of his death is unknown; he is last recorded as having been alive in 1309, acting on behalf of Amalric. The suggestion (made by Charles Kohler in the preface to the 1906 edition of the History) that one Haytonus, Armeniorum dux generalis recorded as present in the Council of Adana in 1314 is to be identified with Hayton of Corycus has not found mainstream acceptance due to the ubiquity of the Armenian name Hayton.

Hayton's daughter Isabel (1282–1310) married Oshin, the son of King Leo II, King of Cilician Armenia from 1307 to 1320. His son Oshin of Corycus became regent of Cilician Armenia from 1320, presumably indicating that Hayton was no longer alive.

== La Flor des estoires de la terre d'Orient ==
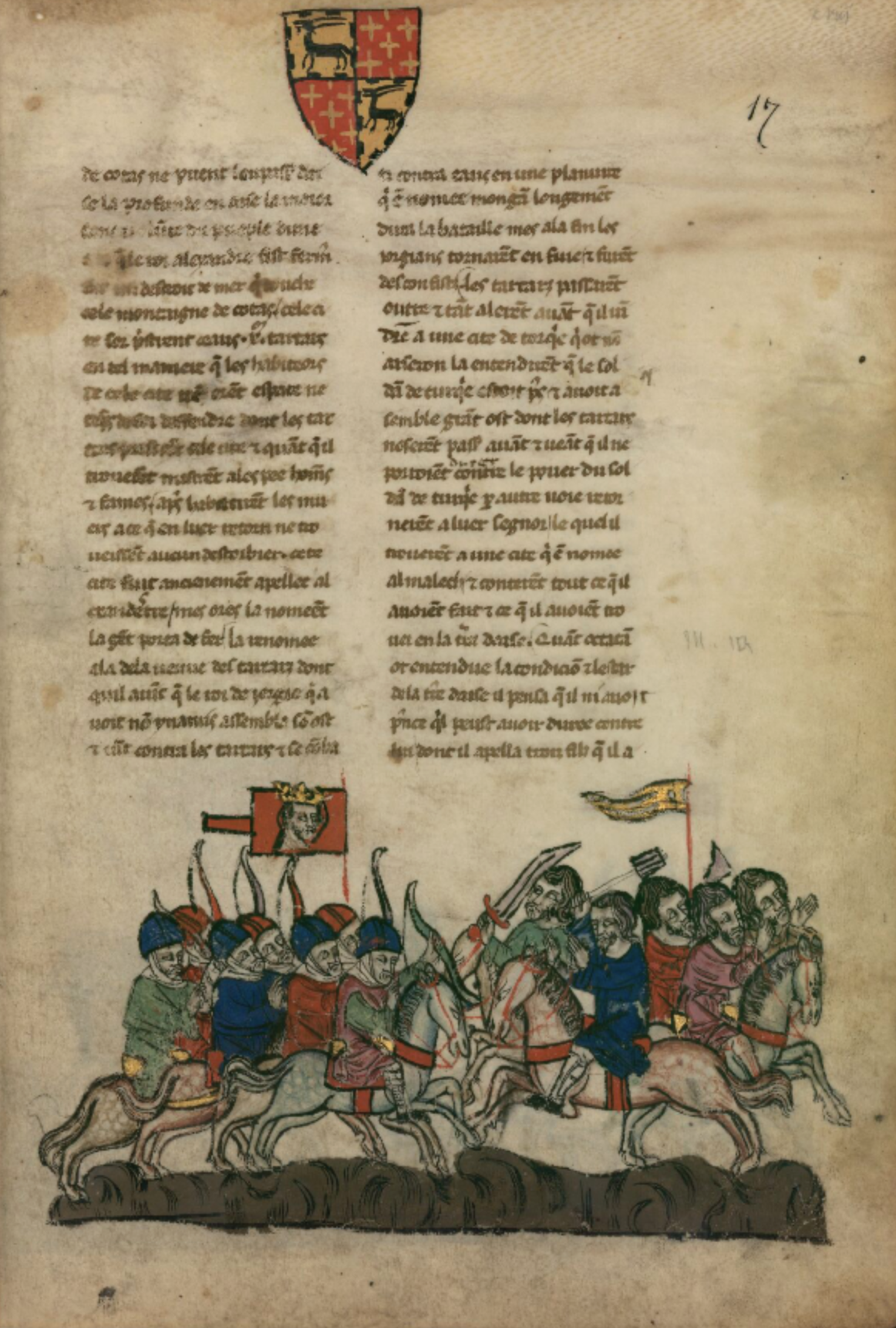
Manuscript depicting Georgian-Mongol wars.

While in France, Hayton compiled a geography of Asia, one of the first of the Middle Ages, La Flor des Estoires d'Orient (Latin: Flos Historiarum Terre Orientis, "The flower of the stories of the Orient"). The work consists of four books of unequal lengths, the main part being contained in book 3, after which the entire work is sometimes referred to as the "History of the Tartars", which gives a history of the Mongols and the Mongol invasions.

For his history of the Mongols Hayton names an Estoires des Tartars ("History of the Tartars") as his source for the time until the reign of Möngke Khan (1250s), while for more recent events, he relies on the accounts by his great-uncle, king Hethum I, and on his own experiences. He is also informed by western sources on the history of the Crusades, and most likely draws on the travelogues of Giovanni da Pian del Carpine and Marco Polo.

Book 1 describes the geography of Asia as divided into the kingdoms of Cathay (China), Tars (Uyghurs), Turkestan, Khwarazmia, Cumania, India, Persia, Media, Armenia, Georgia, Chaldea, Mesopotamia, the "Land of the Turks" (Seljuks) and Syria.

Book 2 gives an account of the "Lordship of the Saracens", i.e. the Muslim conquests of the 7th century and the succeeding Caliphates.

Book 3, known as the "History of the Tartars", provides an account of the rise of the Mongol Empire, and of recent events in the Near East, especially relating to the history of the Armenian kingdom and its interaction with the Mongol Ilkhanate, to which it had been tributary since 1236.

Book 4 discusses a proposed alliance of Christendom with the Mongol Empire to the end of a renewed crusade in the Holy Land. The work concludes with a plan for a new crusade, which Hayton proposed should be organised in alliance with the Ilkhan. Hayton's promotion of this Ilkhanid alliance, and also his association with certain parties in the complex Armenian and Cypriot politics of the day, make this work rather tendentious. (Note: "Echoes of Hayton's Flor des estoires ... can be found in many works that touch on the kingdom, [but] this is an extremely tendentious work, designed to be a piece of propaganda.") Thus, Hayton is always keen to ascribe motives for Mongol actions that would endear them to his papal audience, as with his account of the Ilkhan Hülegü's rather destructive invasion of Syria (1259–60):

The Khan wanted to go to Jerusalem in order to deliver the Holy Land from the Saracens and to remit it to the Christians. The king Hethum I was very happy with this request, and assembled a great score of men on foot and on horse, because, in that time, the Kingdom of Armenia was in such a good state that it easily had 12,000 soldiers on horse and 60,000 soldiers on foot.

Hayton dictated his text to one Nicolas Faulcon using the French language. Faulcon then prepared a Latin translation of his French text. The work was completed and presented to Pope Clement V in 1307. Faulcon's text is preserved in numerous manuscripts, a total of 18 of the French text and 32 of the Latin text (two which are not independent witnesses but notebooks or indices of variants). Some of these manuscripts still date to the first half of the 14th century. For the French text: Turin University library IV.30, Paris BNF nouv. acq. fr. 886, Vienna national library no. 2620; for the Latin text: Paris BNF lat. 5515 and lat. 14693. There is another French text, translated from Faulcon's Latin text by one Jean le Long in 1351 (preserved in 3 manuscripts). In addition there is one Aragonese translation made for Juan Fernández de Heredia, grand master of the Hospitallers, besides a former Catalan translation having maybe the same origin, and one English language manuscript of the 16th century, presumably made for Henry VIII. The Editio princeps was prepared in Paris in 1510, based on Faulcon's French text. Faulcon's Latin text appeared in Haguenau (1529), Basel (1532) and Helmstedt 1585, Jean le Long's French version in Paris (1529).

An English translation (independent of the English manuscript text) by Richard Pynson was printed in London in the 1520s. Other translations included German (Strasbourg 1534), Dutch (Antwerpen 1563), Italian (Venice 1559, 1562, 1562) and Spanish (Córdoba 1595) versions.

A modern edition of the text was prepared (with modern French translation and commentary) in 1906 for Recueil des historiens des croisades.
