= Oshin of Korikos =

Regent of the Armenian Kingdom of Cilicia

Oshin of Korikos (or Corycos) (died 1329) served as regent of the Armenian Kingdom of Cilicia from 1320 to 1329. He was the son of the historian Hayton of Korikos. He became regent for Leo IV on the death of King Oshin in 1320, whom he was rumoured to have poisoned. Oshin was also probably responsible for the deaths of King Oshin's sister Princess Isabella of Armenia and two of her sons, in order to remove rival claimants.

Oshin married twice:

- First, Margaret d'Ibelin, who bore him one daughter, Alice, who married King Leo IV of Armenia.
- Second, King Oshin's widow, Jeanne of Anjou. Oshin of Korikos and Jeanne had a daughter, Marie, who consecutively married two Armenian Kings of Cilicia, Constantine V and Constantine VI.

Oshin and his daughter Alice (Leo's wife) were assassinated in 1329 at the behest of Leo IV.
