= Amalric, Lord of Tyre =

Lord of Tyre (c. 1272–1310)

Amalric
- Lord of Tyre
- Born: c. 1272; Nicosia
- Died: 5 June 1310; Nicosia
- Spouse: Isabella Hethumid of Armenia
- Issue: Constantine II, King of Armenia; John; Agnes (Mary)
- House: Poitiers-Lusignan
- Father: Hugh III, King of Cyprus
- Mother: Isabella of Ibelin

Amalric, Lord of Tyre, also called Amalric of Lusignan or Amaury de Lusignan (c. 1272 – June 5, 1310, in Nicosia) was a prince and statesman of the House of Lusignan, a younger son of King Hugh III of Cyprus and Isabella of the House of Ibelin. He was given the title of Lord of Tyre in 1291, shortly before the city of Tyre fell to the Mamluks of Egypt. He is often but incorrectly called the Prince of Tyre.

In April 1306, with the support of the barons, Amalric forced his brother Henry II to cede authority to him. He thereafter governed Cyprus as "rector, governor and administrator", effectively regent, until his assassination.

== Life ==
Amalric was at the Fall of Tripoli in 1289, in which he led a company of knights and four galleys from Cyprus. He escaped the siege of Tripoli together with Lucia of Tripoli, and was made Constable of Jerusalem in April 1289.

In 1290, he became Lord of Tyre. He was the officer in command of the Accursed Tower at the siege of Acre in 1291, and escaped the fall of the Kingdom of Jerusalem with his brother, King Henry II.

In 1300 Amalric attempted combined military operations with the Mongols under Ghazan to retake the Holy Land. He and other Cypriots occupied the island of Ruad, but the Mongols did not appear and the Westerners withdrew, eventually losing the island entirely in the Siege of Ruad.

When his brother Henry became unpopular in Cyprus, Amalric overthrew him with the aid of the Knights Templar and some of the barons, assuming the titles of "Governor and Rector" on April 26, 1306. The overthrow was not violent; Henry had few supporters, and was simply taken away and confined at Strovolos.

Amalric's rule was initially popular, and he repaired relations with Venice, Genoa, and the Hospitallers.

However, when the Knights Templar were being suppressed in 1307, he was compelled to obey the Papal directive to arrest local Templars, which resulted in a small uprising in favor of Henry in January 1308. It quickly collapsed, but Amalric was forced to arrest a number of nobles, including Rupen of Montfort, John of Dampierre, and various members of the Ibelin family. In April, two of the Ibelins were exiled to Armenia, and John of Dampierre was mortally wounded by a mob after attempting to communicate with King Henry. In February 1310, Amalric sent Henry into exile in Armenia.

Amalric was murdered by Simon of Montolif at Nicosia on June 5, 1310, and buried at Santa Sophia, at Nicosia. On his death, his brother Aimery was proclaimed Governor of Nicosia, but was soon defeated and imprisoned, and Henry restored to power.

== Family ==
In 1292/1293 Amalric married Cilician Armenian princess Isabella in the city of Nicosia. They had:

- Hugh (died between 1318 & April 9, 1323, Cilicia), Lord of Crusoche, married to Eschiva of Ibelin (died after March 1324).
- Henry (murdered before April 9, 1323, Cilicia), unmarried
- Guy (d. April 17, 1344, Armenia), King of Armenia as Constantine II. He married firstly to a woman from Kantakouzenos family; secondly to Theodora Syrgiannaina. From his second marriage he had
  - Isabelle/Zampea of Poitiers-Lusignan, who married Manuel Kantakouzenos despot of Morea, without issue.
- John (murdered August 7, 1343, Cilicia), sometime Constable and Regent of Cilicia, died 1346
- Bohémond (murdered April 17, 1344, Cilicia), Count of Corcyus, Lord of Korikos (1336), married in 1340 Euphemia of Neghir (1325 – aft. 1381, Jerusalem)
- Agnes (Mary) (d. aft. 1309), married c. 1305 or 1305/1306 Leo III of Armenia (1297 – murdered 1307)

After Amalric's death, his widow and children remained in Armenia; only his daughter would die a natural death, his widow and sons all being murdered at various times.
