= Leo V of Armenia =

King of Armenia from 1374 to 1393

Levon V Լևոն Ե
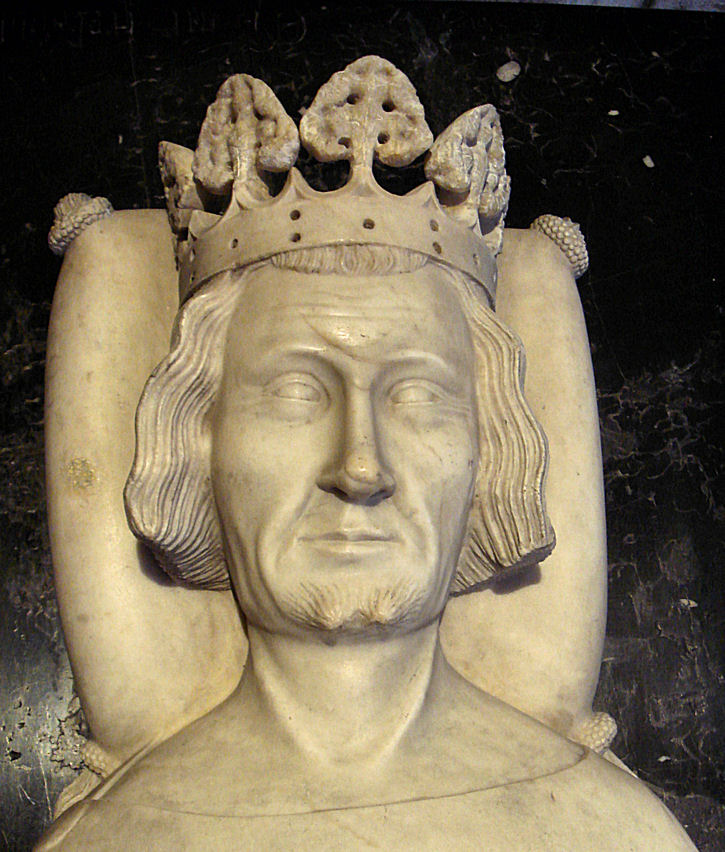
- Bust of Leo V inside the Basilica of Saint-Denis

King of Armenia
- Reign: 14 September 1374 – 13 April 1375
- Coronation: 14 September 1374
- Predecessor: Constantine IV
- Born: c. 1342; Cyprus
- Died: 29 November 1393 (aged 50–51); Hôtel des Tournelles, Paris
- Burial: Saint Denis Basilica
- Spouse: Margaret of Soissons
- House: Poitiers-Lusignan
- Father: John of Poitiers-Lusignan
- Mother: Soldane Bagrationi of Georgia
- Religion: Armenian Catholic
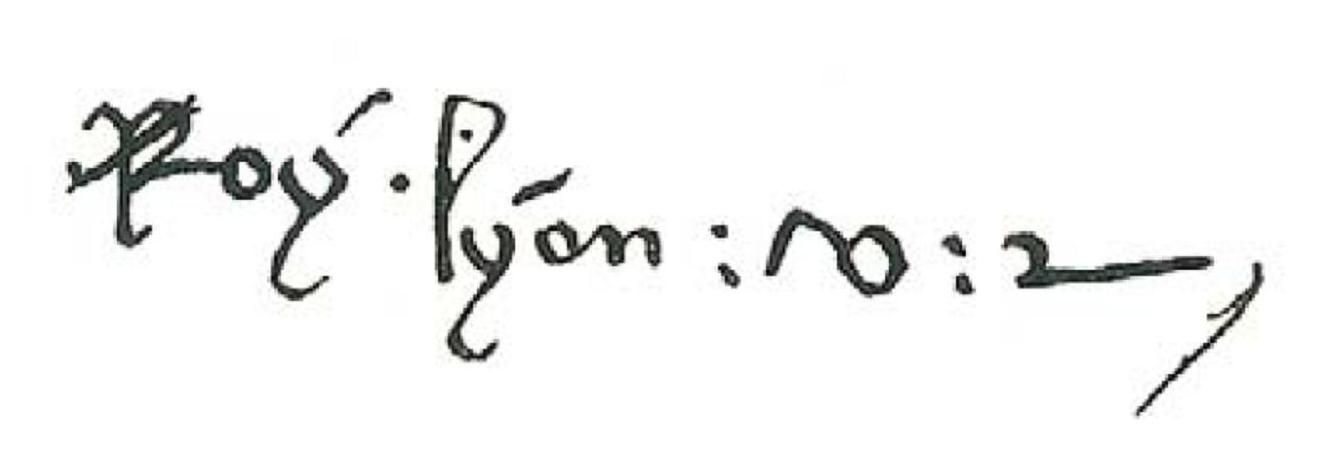
- Signature

Leo V or Levon V (occasionally Levon VI; Armenian: Լեւոն, Levon V; 1342 – 29 November 1393), of the House of Lusignan, was the last Latin king of the Armenian Kingdom of Cilicia. Leo was described as "Leo V, King of Armenia" on his own personal seal (Sigilum Leonis Quinti Regis Armenie), and as "Leo of Lusignan the Fifth" in the Middle French inscription on his cenotaph: Leon de Lizingnen quint.

== Reign in Cilicia ==
In 1365, Pope Urban V selected Leo as the potential ruler of Cilician Armenia, but Constantine IV ascended the throne instead. After Constantine IV's murder, Catholicos Constantine V led the people in crowning Leo on 14 September 1374. However, his reign encountered internal opposition concerning the spiritual authority of the Pope.

Leo ruled until 13 April 1375, when he was overthrown and captured following the Fall of Sis by an invading army from the Mamluk Sultanate in Egypt led by Sultan Al-Ashraf Sha'ban, ending the Armenian Kingdom of Cilicia. In July 1377, he met monk Jean Dardel, who accompanied him as counselor, ambassador and historian-biographer. Leo was held hostage in Alexandria, Egypt, with his wife and daughter for seven years until ransomed by the King of Castile, John I. In October 1382, he embarked from Alexandria to Europe.

== Life in Europe ==
Leo arrived ill and poor in Medina del Campo. King John I of Castile gifted Leo V the lordship of Madrid together with those of Villa Real and Andújar in 1383. The Madrilenian concejo made sure that the privilege of lordship did not become hereditary, also presumably receiving a non-sale privilege guaranteeing never again to be handed over by the Crown to a lord. He was also provided an annual gift of 150,000 maravedis. Leon rebuilt the towers of the Royal Alcázar.

According to father Juan de Mariana, Leo left Castile for France after the death of his protector in 1390. Federico Bravo, however, states that he left after two years of ruling, and five years later, the Madrilenians were granted the revocation of the lordship by John.

Leo V apparently went to Paris in June 1384, and received the Saint-Ouen castle and a sizable pension from King Charles VI of France. He attempted to reconcile the French and the English (at the time fighting against each other in the Hundred Years' War) in order to set up a new Crusade and obtain help to recover his lands, but the meeting he organized in 1386 between Boulogne and Calais were unsuccessful. Leo continued his diplomatic mission to England in 1389 and in 1392.

== Death ==
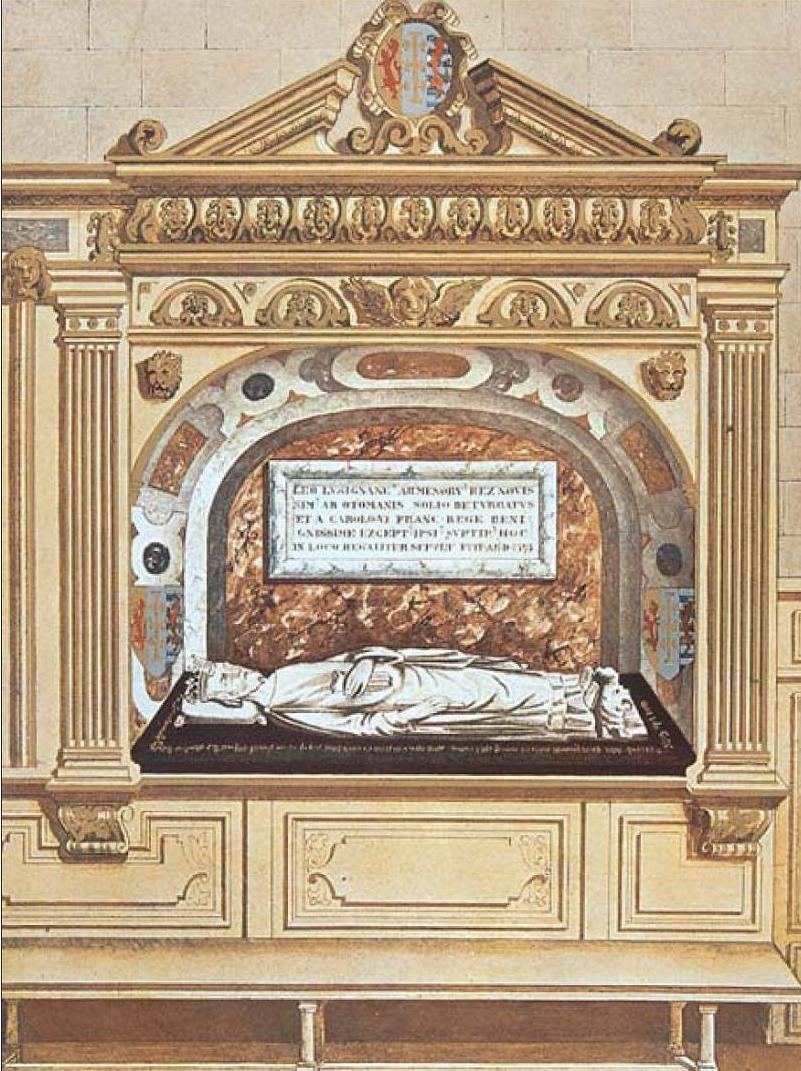
Original tomb of Leon V, in the Couvent des Célestins, Paris.

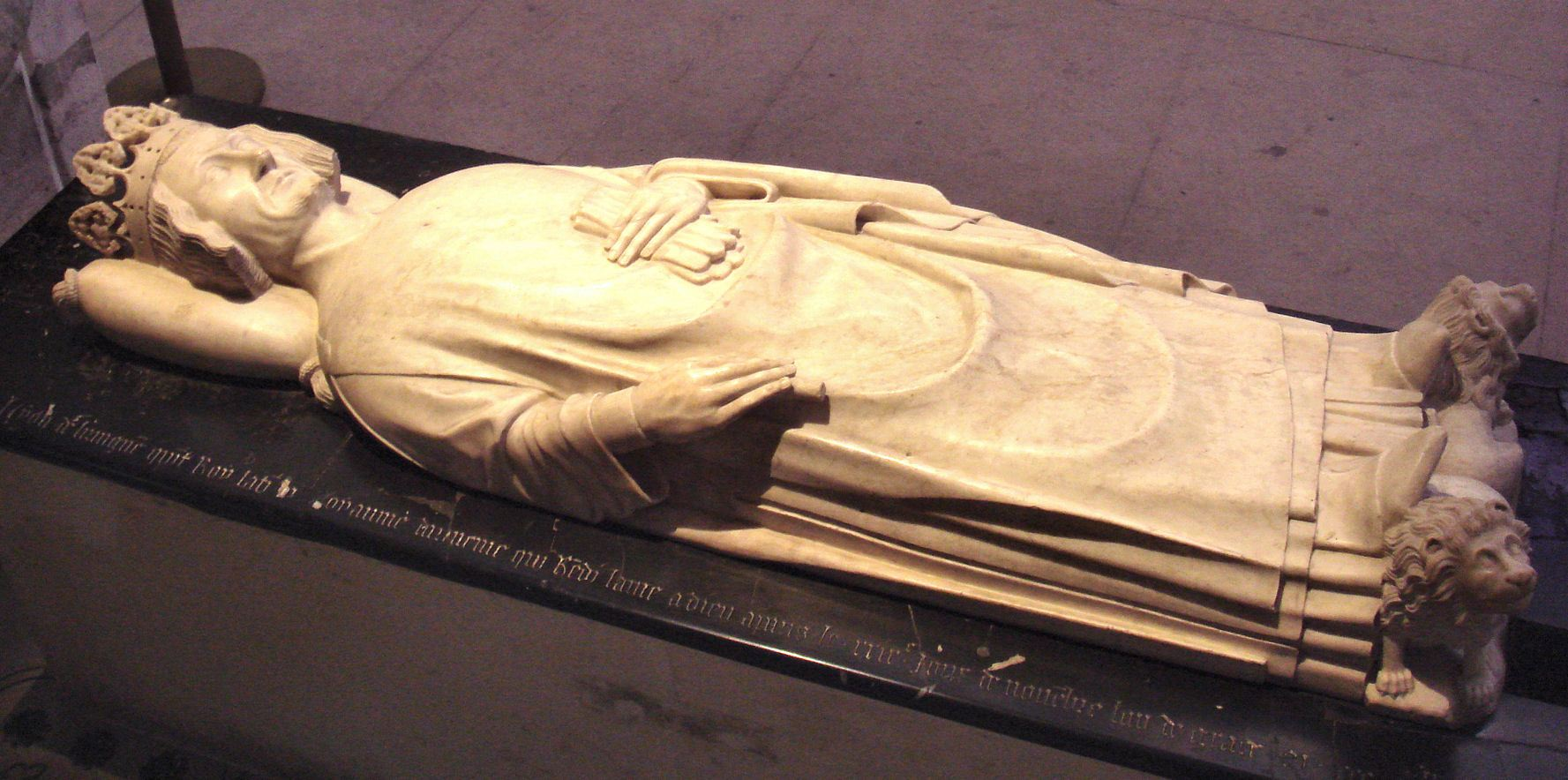
Tomb of Leon V of Armenia, at the Basilique Saint-Denis, France.

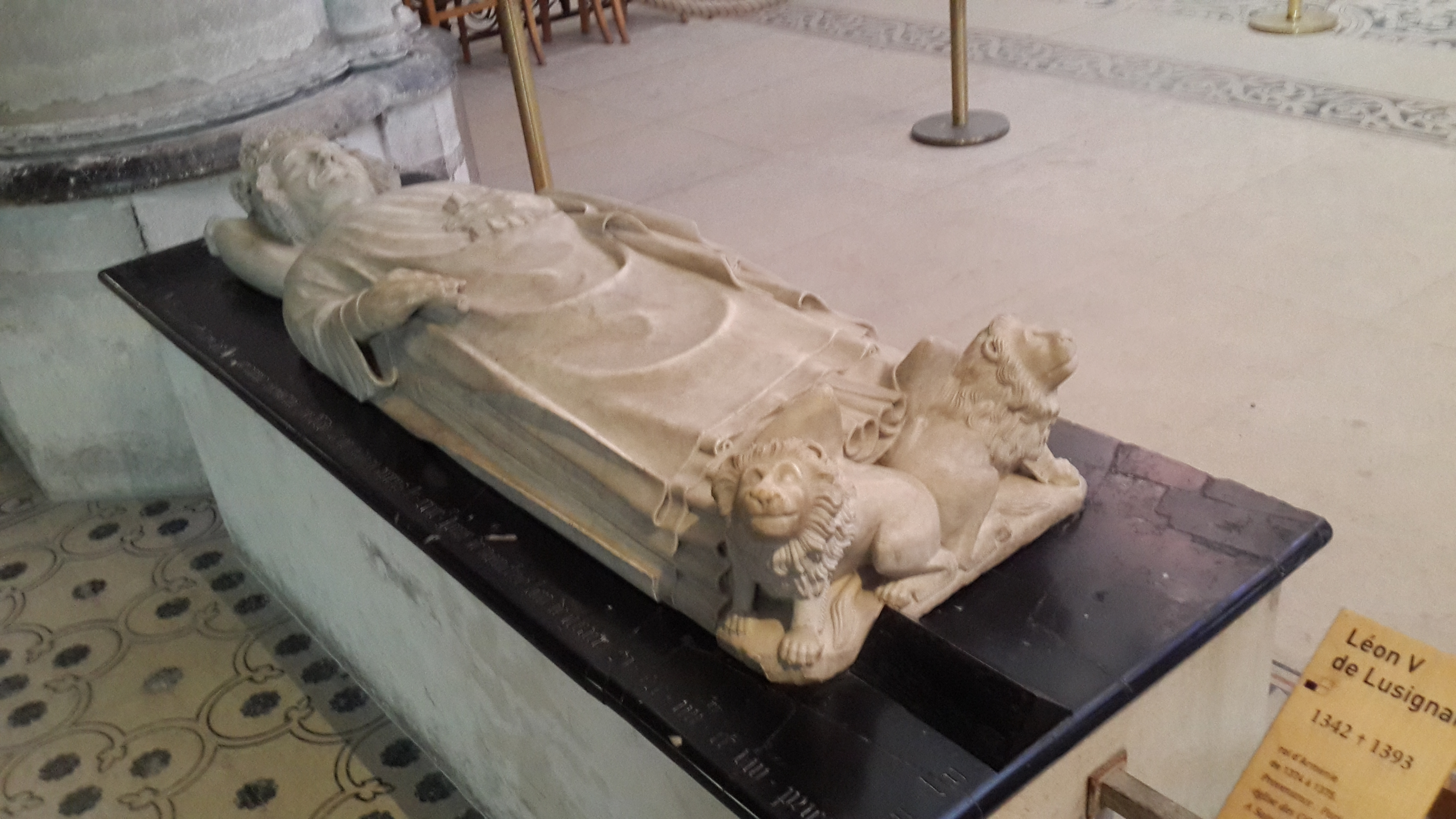
Tomb of Leo V

Leo V never recovered his throne, and died in Paris on 29 November 1393. His remains were laid to rest in the Couvent des Célestins, the second most important burial site for royalty after the Saint-Denis Basilica, located near what is now the Place de la Bastille in Paris. The prestigious convent was located nearby Leo's residence of Hôtel des Tournelles, itself near Hôtel Saint-Pol, the favourite residence of Charles V and Charles VI in the area of Le Marais.

Leo received lavish funerals and had a lavish tomb, located in the choir of the church. However, the convent was profanated during the French Revolution. After the revolution, his tombstone was recovered by Alexandre Lenoir who placed it in his Musée des monuments Français in the Saint-Denis Basilica. In 1815, during the Restoration, a new cenotaph was established for Leo V at the royal Saint Denis Basilica, where most representatives of the French monarchy lie.

The effigy on the tombstone, by an anonymous artist, is of a high realism and quality, and it is thought that it was made while Leo was still alive. Leo V is depicted holding a scepter (now broken) and gloves, symbol of great princes.

The tombstone bears the following inscription in Old French:

Cy gist tres noble et excellent prince Leon de Lizingnen quint roy Latin du royaume d'Armenie qui rendit l'ame a Dieu a Paris le XXIXe jour de novembre l'an de grace M.CCC.IIIIXX.XIII. Priez pour luy.	Here lies the right noble and excellent Prince Leon de Lusignan V, Latin king of the kingdom of Armenia, who passed away in Paris on the 29th day of November of the year of Grace 1393. Pray for him.

He had one legitimate daughter, Marie de Lusignan (ca 1370 – Cairo, before July 4, 1381, who predeceased her mother and father), and two illegitimate sons, Guy de Lusignan or Guido de Armenia (died 1405), a Canon in Autun, Bayeux, Paris and Arras and Captain of the Tower of Ambleny or Donjon d'Ambleny (Keep of Ambleny), and Stephan or Etienne de Lusignan, a Knight in Sis.

Upon his death, the title of King of Armenia was claimed by Leo's second cousin James I of Cyprus.

== See also ==
- Armenia-France relations

== Bibliography ==
- Boase, T. S. R. (1978). The Cilician Kingdom of Armenia. Edinburgh: Scottish Academic Press. ISBN 0-7073-0145-9.
- Kühl, Henriette (2000). Leon V. von Kleinarmenien. Ein Leben zwischen Orient und Okzident im Zeichen der Kreuzzugsbewegung Ende des 14. Jahrhunderts [Leon V of Cilician Armenia. A life between East and West influenced by the Crusader movement at the end of the 14th century]. Frankfurt: Lang, ISBN 3-631-37180-2.
- Mutafian, Claude (2001). Le Royaume Arménien de Cilicie. Paris: CNRS Editions. ISBN 2-271-05105-3.
- Claude Mutafian, Leon V of Lusignan, last king of Armenia (PDF)
- Pierre-Yves Le Pogam, Tomb of Leon V de Lusignan (PDF)
- Dadoyan, Seta B. (2013). The Armenians in the Medieval Islamic World: Armenian Realpolitik in the Islamic World and Diverging Paradigms: Case of Cilicia Eleventh to Fourteenth Centuries. Vol. 2. New Brunswick, New Jersey: Transaction Publishers. ISBN 978-1-4128-4782-7.
- Garabed Basmadjian. Levon E Lusinean. Last King of Armenia (Լեւոն Ե Լուսինեան. Վերջին թագաւոր Հայոց). Paris: Doghramadjian Press. 1908 PDF (archived PDF)

Leo V of Armenia House of Lusignan Born: unknown 1342 Died: 29 November 1393
Regnal titles
Preceded by Constantine IV	King of Cilician Armenia; 1374 – 1375	Mamluk conquest
Mamluk conquest	— TITULAR — King of Cilician Armenia; 1375 – 1393	Succeeded by James I of Cyprus
