= Constantine IV of Armenia =

King of Armenia from 1362 to 1373

Constantine IV
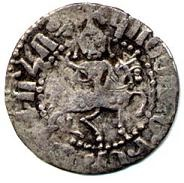

King of Armenia
- Reign: 1362/1365 – 1373
- Predecessor: Constantine III; Leo the Usurper
- Successor: Leo V
- Died: 1373
- Spouse: Mary of Oghruy
- Dynasty: Hethumids
- Father: Hethum of Neghir

Constantine IV (also Constantine VI; Armenian: Կոստանդին, Western Armenian transliteration: Gosdantin or Kostantine; died 1373) was the King of Armenian Cilicia from 1362 until his death. He was the son of Hethum of Neghir, a nephew of Hethum I of Armenia. Constantine came to the throne on the death of his cousin Constantine III, whose widow, Maria, daughter of Oshin of Corycos, he married.

Constantine formed an alliance with Peter I of Cyprus, offering him the port and castle of Corycus. On Peter's death in 1369, Constantine looked for a treaty with the Sultan of Egypt. The barons were unhappy with this policy, fearing annexation by the sultan, and in 1373 Constantine was murdered. Upon his death, he was succeeded by his distant cousin Leo V, one of the Poitiers-Lusignan dynasty, who would become the last king of Cilician Armenia.

Coat of arms of Hetumids of Lesser Armenia

== Bibliography ==
- Boase, T. S. R. (1978). The Cilician Kingdom of Armenia. Edinburgh: Scottish Academic Press. ISBN 0-7073-0145-9.

Constantine IV of Armenia House of Neghir; House of Lusignan
Regnal titles
Preceded by Constantine III of Armenia	King of Armenia; 1362 – 1373	Succeeded by Levon V of Armenia
