= Isabella of Armenia, Princess of Tyre =

Isabella of Armenia
- Lady of Tyre
- Born: 1275/1280
- Died: Before 9 April 1323; Cilicia
- Spouse: Amalric, Lord of Tyre
- Issue more: Guy of Lusignan; John of Lusignan
- House: Hetoumides
- Father: Leo II, King of Armenia
- Mother: Keran of Lampron

Isabella of Armenia (Armenian: Զապել; 1275–1280 – murdered in Armenia before 9 April 1323) was the daughter of Leo II of Armenia.

== Early life and family ==
Isabella was the fourth daughter and tenth child of Leo II of Armenia and his wife, Keran; she was also their third daughter to be named Isabella (both previous daughters had died in early childhood). She was the twin sister of Sempad.

== Marriage and issue ==
She was married at Nicosia in 1292–1293 to Amalric of Cyprus, by whom she had six children:

1. Hugh
2. Henry (died c. 1321)
3. Guy (died 1344)
4. John (died 1343)
5. Bohemond (died 1344)
6. Maria, who married her cousin Leo IV of Armenia

At some time between 1320 and 1323, Isabella, along with her son Henry, was imprisoned and murdered by Oshin of Corycos. Oshin, who was acting as regent for Leo IV of Armenia, wanted to reduce the number of claimants to the throne of the Cilician Kingdom. It has been rumored that Oshin poisoned Isabella to remove her from the line of inheritance.

== Bibliography ==
- Boase, T. S. R. (1978). The Cilician Kingdom of Armenia. Edinburgh: Scottish Academic Press. ISBN 0-7073-0145-9.
