= Constantine III of Armenia =

King of Armenian Cilicia from 1344 to 1362

Constantine III Կոնստանտին Գ
- Constantine III (seated) with Hospitallers (1844 painting by Henri Delaborde)
- Reign: 1344–1362
- Predecessor: Constantine II
- Successor: Constantine IV; Leo the Usurper
- Born: 17 April 1313
- Died: 31 December 1362 (aged 49)
- House: Hethumids

Constantine III (also Constantine V; French: Constantin V d'Arménie; Armenian: Կոստանդին, Western Armenian transliteration: Gosdantin or Kostantine; 17 April 1313 – 21 December 1362) was the King of Armenian Cilicia from 1344 to 1362. He was the son of Baldwin, Lord of Neghir (a nephew of Hethum I of Armenia), and second cousin of Constantine II.

When Constantine II was killed in an uprising in 1344, Constantine III succeeded him. He attempted to wipe out all rival claimants to the throne, giving orders to kill Constantine II's nephews, Bemon and Leo, but before the murders could be carried out they escaped to Cyprus. During his rule, the Armenian Kingdom of Cilicia was reduced by Mamluk raids and conquests. They conquered Ajazzo in 1347 and Tarsus and Adana in 1359.

Constantine was the first husband of Maria, daughter of Oshin of Corycos and Joan of Taranto. He was predeceased by his two sons. Upon his death from natural causes he was succeeded by his cousin Constantine IV.

Coat-of-arms of Hetumids of Lesser Armenia

== Notes ==
- Boase, T. S. R. (1978). The Cilician Kingdom of Armenia. Edinburgh: Scottish Academic Press. ISBN 0-7073-0145-9.
- Rüdt-Collenberg, W. H. (1963). The Rupenides, Hethumides and Lusignans: the Structure of the Armeno-Cilician Dynasties. Paris: Imprimerie A. Pignie.

Constantine III of Armenia House of Neghir
Regnal titles
Preceded by Constantine II	King of Armenian Cilicia; 1344–1362	Succeeded by Constantine IV
