= Constantine II, King of Armenia =

King of Armenian Cilicia from 1342 to 1344

Constantine II Կոնստանտին Բ
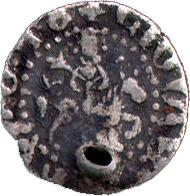

King of Armenia
- Reign: 1342–1344
- Predecessor: Leo IV
- Successor: Leo the Usurper; Constantine III
- Born: Guy de Lusignan
- Died: April 17, 1344
- Spouse: Kantakouzene (d. c. 1330); Theodora Syrgiannaina (d. 1347/1349)
- Issue: Isabella (or Zampea or Maria)
- House: Poitiers-Lusignan
- Father: Amalric, Lord of Tyre
- Mother: Isabella of Armenia

Constantine's arms, a combination of those of Lusignan, Jerusalem, and Cilicia.

Constantine II (Armenian: Կոստանդին Բ), (also Constantine IV; Western Armenian transliteration: Gosdantin; died 17 April 1344), born Guy de Lusignan, was elected the first Latin King of Armenian Cilicia of the Poitiers-Lusignan dynasty, ruling from 1342 until his death in 1344.

== Life ==
Guy de Lusignan was the son of Isabella, daughter of Leo II of Armenia, and Amalric, a son of Hugh III of Cyprus, and was governor of Serres from 1328 until 1341. When his cousin Leo IV, the last Hethumid monarch of Cilicia, was murdered by the barons, the crown was offered to his younger brother John, who urged Guy to accept it. Guy was reluctant — his mother and two of his brothers had been murdered by the Armenian regent Oshin of Corycos — but he eventually accepted and took the name Constantine.

Guy was killed in an uprising in Armenia on April 17, 1344 and was succeeded by a distant cousin, Constantine III.

== Marriages and issue ==
Guy married twice, firstly to a Kantakouzene (died c. 1330), without issue, and secondly in 1330–1332, Theodora Syrgiannaina (died 1347/1349), with whom he fathered:

- Isabella of Lusignan (c. or after 1333 – in Cyprus, 1382–1387), Lady of Aradippou, married after February 26, 1349 Manuel Kantakouzenos (c. 1326 – April 10, 1380), Despot of Morea.

== Sources ==
- Boase, T. S. R. (1978). The Cilician Kingdom of Armenia. Edinburgh: Scottish Academic Press. ISBN 0-7073-0145-9.
- Boustronios, Georgios (2005). A Narrative of the Chronicle of Cyprus: 1456-1489. State University of New York Press.
- Ghazarian, Jacob G (2000). The Armenian Kingdom in Cilicia during the Crusades: The Integration of Cilician Armenians with the Latins (1080–1393). Abingdon: Curzon Press. ISBN 0-7007-1418-9.
- Hacikyan, Agop Jack, ed. (2002). The Heritage of Armenian Literature: From the sixth to the eighteenth century. Vol. II. Wayne State University Press.
- Runciman, Steven (1999). A History of the Crusades. Vol. III:The Kingdom of Acre and the Later Crusades. Cambridge University Press.

Constantine II, King of Armenia House of Lusignan
Regnal titles
Preceded by Levon IV	King of Armenia; 1342–1344	Succeeded by Constantine III
