= Siege of Rumkale =

1292 siege in Rumkale

- Part of the Mongol invasions of the Levant
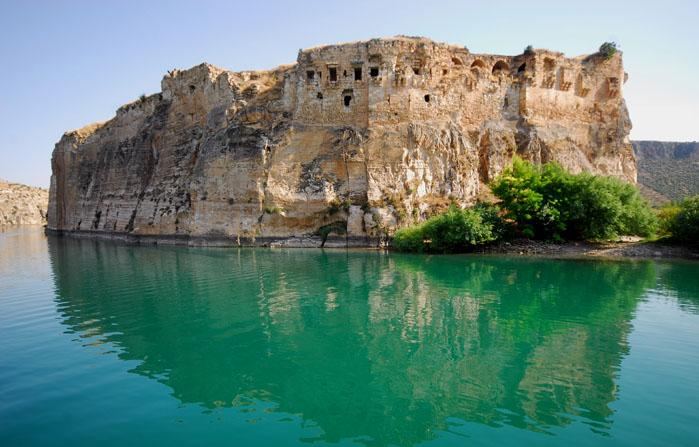
- The Rumkale fortress
Date	691 AH/1292 AD
Location	Rumkale, Armenian Kingdom of Cilicia (in modern-day Gaziantep Province, Urfa, Turkey) 37°16′19″N 37°50′17″E
Result	Mamluk victory

Belligerents
Armenian Kingdom of Cilicia	Mamluk Sultanate

Commanders and leaders
Stephen IV (POW)	Al-Ashraf Khalil; Sanjar al-Shuja‘i; Ibn al-Sal'us; Sharaf al-Din bin al-Khutair †; Shihab al-Din bin Rukn al-Din, Emir of Jandar †; Sayf al-Din Aqjaba (WIA)

The siege of Rumkale or the fall of Rumkale took place in 691 AH/1292 AD and resulted in the Armenian Kingdom of Cilicia losing the castle of Rumkale to the Mamluk Sultanate of Egypt.

== Background ==
Amidst the fierce wars between the Egyptian Mamluks on one hand and the Mongol Ilkhanate and the Crusaders on the other hand, the Kingdom of Lesser Armenia which was an Armenian Kingdom in southern Anatolia (modern-day southern Turkey). When the Mongols were preparing to invade Egypt, the Armenians supported them. These forces were annihilated along with the Mongols at the hands of the Egyptian Mamluks in the Battle of Ain Jalut (1260), and in all the battles in which the Armenians cooperated with the Mongols or Crusaders after that.

After the Egyptian Mamluk army conquered Acre, which was considered the most important Crusader city and the heir to the throne of the Kingdom of Jerusalem, there was an Armenian castle called the Rumkale (meaning the "Roman Castle"). This castle was very important to the Armenians because it was the seat of the Armenian Patriarch. It was also a refuge to the Mongols and the Crusaders who fled from the Egyptian army in the Levant. The castle's forces, led by the Armenian Patriarch Stephen IV, secretly carried out raids on Muslim caravans and on rural villages, in violation of a treaty with the Mamluk sultan of Egypt al-Mansur Qalawun.

The na'ib (deputy) of Aleppo learned through his spies about these violations of the treaty. In 1292, a detailed report was sent to Sultan al-Ashraf Khalil, who was still returning to Egypt after the conquest of Acre. The sultan ordered a general mobilization throughout Egypt and the usual call for volunteers in Egypt to join a campaign against Rumkale. The preachers in the mosques delivered sermons to encourage Muslims to join the jihad. Al-Maqrizi, a 14th-century writer, mentions that the most prominent preacher was the Abbasid caliph, who delivered a sermon in the mosque of the citadel.

== Siege ==
Sultan al-Ashraf Khalil bin Qalawun accompanied by his vizier Ibn al-Sal'us came out at the head of the Egyptian army to confront the Armenians. The army reached the city of Damascus, then moved to Aleppo. From Aleppo, it reached the walls of the Rumkale Citadel, whose inhabitants and its Armenian and Mongol fighters were shocked by the Egyptian army outside the city walls. But despite the terror within the walls of the castle, the city was very impregnable because of the Euphrates River and the Marzban River, which surrounded the castle from every point, and its mountainous nature, in addition to the strength and height of its walls. All of these factors made it a more formidable and stronger castle than the Acre Castle, which the Egyptians conquered with great difficulty.

The Egyptian army did not give up and began to implement a plan that was extremely intelligent and difficult at the same time. As an attempt to restrict the inhabitants of the castle, the Armenians and Mongols, and force them to surrender, the Egyptian forces pulled the waters of the Euphrates River towards the valleys and they were filled with water. With the presence of the Marzaban River, the Egyptians knew that they could control the castle from all sides. 30 catapults were deployed and began to demolish the city walls during the siege on it, the catapults continued to strike the walls of the citadel without stopping for a month until the walls of the city were pierced on many sides. At that time, Emir Sanjar al-Shuja'i, the na'ib (deputy) of Damascus, ordered a chain to be made and entangled in the holes. The soldiers mounted it, and fought intensely. The citadel was conquered on Saturday, the eleventh of Rajab, in the year 691 AH, corresponding to 28 June 1292 AD.

== Aftermath ==
After the Egyptians entered the citadel, they stormed the headquarters of the Armenian Patriarch Stephen IV, who was attacking Egyptian caravans and villages and protecting the Mongols, and he was arrested. Historian Muhammad Kurd Ali says:

“In the year 691 AH, al-Malik al-Ashraf went with his Egyptian soldiers and went to the Rumkale Castle, which is on the side of the Euphrates, where the Armenian Patriarch Kitagekos (Stephen IV) resided. He took him and those with him captive, and destroyed what was ruined from this fortified castle.”

The siege of the castle lasted for 33 days, and after its conquest, Sultan Khalil named it the Qal'at al-Muslimin (Castle of the Muslims), instead of its old name, the Rumkale Castle. It was known by this name, and Sultan Khalil ordered the rebuilding of everything that was destroyed in the castle and the flags of the Sultanate be raised over it on all sides.

Sultan Khalil left Emir Sanjar al-Shuja‘i at the castle and returned to Damascus with prisoners. The population of Damascus bid farewell to the victorious Sultan on his way to Cairo at night with thousands of lighted candles. The army returned, with Sultan El-Ashraf Khalil at its head, and entered Cairo at night from the Bab al-Nasr (Victory Gate), according to the old Egyptian custom. The army was received by tens of thousands of Egyptian people who lighted thousands of candles and hanged decorations. The women continued to ululate and the voices of takbir and applause rose.
