= Ibn al-Sal'us =

Vizier to the Mamluk sultanate of Egypt

Al-Sahib Shams ad-Din Muhammad ibn Uthman ibn Abi al-Raja' al-Tanukhi, better known as Ibn al-Sal'us (Arabic: ابن السلعوس) (died 10 December 1294), was an Arab merchant and the wazir (chief financial adviser) of the Mamluk sultan, al-Ashraf Khalil (r. 1290–1293). Ibn al-Sal'us began his career as a merchant based in Damascus, where he was eventually employed as a deputy muhtasib (market inspector). He gained a good reputation for his efforts at ensuring accountability in Damascene commerce. He was later appointed chief muhtasib in Cairo by Sultan al-Mansur Qalawun in 1290, but was soon after exiled to the Hejaz. When al-Ashraf Khalil succeeded Qalawun in November 1290, he recalled Ibn al-Sal'us to Cairo and appointed him wazir. Ibn al-Sal'us restored the political influence of the office of wazir and accompanied al-Ashraf Khalil during military expeditions against the Crusaders and the Armenians. His arrogance toward senior Mamluk emirs drew their resentment. In the months following al-Ashraf Khalil's murder, Ibn al-Sal'us was arrested and tortured to death on the orders of his rival, Emir Sanjar al-Shuja‘i.

== Biography ==
=== Early life and career ===
Ibn al-Sal'us was born to an Arab family in the city of Nablus in Palestine. He was raised in Damascus, where his father, Muhammad ibn Uthman, was a merchant. Ibn al-Sal'us became a merchant like his father and traveled extensively throughout the Middle East. He returned to Damascus at some point and set up his mercantile business. He gained an honorable reputation among other merchants in the city, and became a deputy muhtasib (market inspector) in the employment of the highest-ranking civilian Mamluk functionary in Syria. His employment in the hisba (market oversight) of Damascus occurred during the reign of Sultan al-Mansur Qalawun (1277–1290). Ibn al-Sal'us grew wealthy from his job and was known to diligently police commerce in the city. Mamluk-era chronicler Ibn al-Jazari described part of Ibn al-Sal'us's job as follows:

He rode around the city at night during the month of Ramadan ... to inspect those who produced kunafa, qata'if, sweets and other foods. He inspected the small-scale bazaar merchants, protecting the poor and correcting measures and weights.

In 1290, Ibn al-Sal'us was appointed by Qalawun as chief market inspector in Cairo, where he became close friends with Qalawun's son and heir apparent, al-Ashraf Khalil. However, he soon became involved in political disputes and was exiled to the Hejaz. According to the Mamluk historian, Baybars al-Mansuri, Ibn al-Sal'us was exiled due to Emir Turuntay's incitement against him to the sultan.

=== Wazir of al-Ashraf Khalil ===
Following Qalawun's death in November 1290, al-Ashraf Khalil recalled Ibn al-Sal'us from the Hejaz and appointed him wazir (chief financial adviser) in place of Emir Alam al-Din Sanjar al-Shuja'i al-Mansuri in December. Ibn al-Sal'us was the only non-mamluk appointed to high office during al-Ashraf Khalil's reign. Ibn al-Sal'us played a commanding role in Mamluk military campaign against the Crusader states along the coast of Syria, including the conquest of Acre in June 1291. In 1292, he participated in the Mamluk campaign against Armenia alongside al-Ashraf Khalil, who joined with Ibn al-Sal'us and his troops in Damascus on his way to the Armenian front. and was present during the capture of Qala'at al-Rum. A civilian, Ibn al-Sal'us's assumption of military command during the Armenian campaigns raised the ire of some of the senior Mamluk commanders, including Emir al-Shuja'i.

Ibn al-Sal'us revived the importance of the office of wazir, after its role in the sultanate's hierarchy had declined in the later years of Ayyubid rule. He was regularly accompanied by Mamluk dignitaries and the four chief Muslim judges when he had an audience with al-Ashraf Khalil, supported him unreservedly. As wazir, he commissioned the construction of a ribat (hospice) along the northern wall of the Haram ash-Sharif (Temple Mount) in Jerusalem. By 1310, the ribat was known as the "Ribat Emir Salar" after the 14th-century emir, Salar, and was in use until at least the early 15th century. He was initially well-liked by the Mamluk emirs, but as he behaved arrogantly toward them, they became hostile toward him and came to resent his influence with the sultan. He had personal conflicts with the na'ib as-saltana (viceroy), Emir Baydara, and the atabeg al-asakir (commander in chief), al-Shuja‘i. In early 1292, Ibn al-Sal'us informed al-Ashraf Khalil that Baydara was accruing far more revenue than the sultan from Upper Egypt, to which the sultan reacted by confiscating part of Baydara's iqta (fief). 1293, Ibn al-Sal'us instigated al-Ashraf Khalil's wrath against Baydara during a hunting trip in Buhayra (western Nile Delta) by informing him of Baydara's seizure of the sultan's tax revenues from Alexandria. Al-Ashraf Khalil scolded Baydara, struck him in the head in the presence of other emirs and threatened to allow Ibn al-Sal'us to torture him in prison.

After al-Ashraf Khalil was murdered by emirs Baydara and al-Shuja‘i and their mamluks in December 1293, Ibn al-Sal'us lost his key backer. Al-Ashraf Khalil's younger brother an-Nasir Muhammad was installed on the throne with strongman al-Adil Kitbugha appointed na'ib as-saltana. Ibn al-Sal'us was thereafter replaced as wazir by al-Shuja‘i. Prior to these developments, a kinsman of Ibn al-Sal'us warned him in a poem to "take care ... and know that you have trodden on a viper ... I fear for you of al-Shuja‘i's sting". Ibn al-Sal'us was charged by Shuja'i of committing financial crimes and was arrested. He was subsequently tortured and died of his injuries on 10 December 1294. Afterward, al-Shuja‘i summoned Ibn al-Sal'us's kinsman who wrote him the poem warning of al-Shuja‘i's wrath, but rather than punish him, Shuja'i rewarded Ibn al-Sal'us's kinsman, telling him "You gave him good council, but he did not accept advice."

== Bibliography ==
- Holt, Peter Malcolm (1986). The Age of the Crusades: The Near East from the Eleventh Century to 151. Addison Wesley Longman Limited. ISBN 9781317871521.
- Mazor, Amir (2015). The Rise and Fall of a Muslim Regiment: The Mansuriyya in the First Mamluk Sultanate, 678/1279–741/1341. Vandenhoeck & Ruprecht Unipress and Bonn University Press. ISBN 9783847004240.
- Nicolle, David (2005). Acre 1291: Bloody Sunset of the Crusader States. Osprey Publishing. ISBN 9781841768625.
