= Solamish =

Sultan of Egypt and Syria (r. 1279–1279)

Badr al-Din Solamish
- al-Malik al-Adil
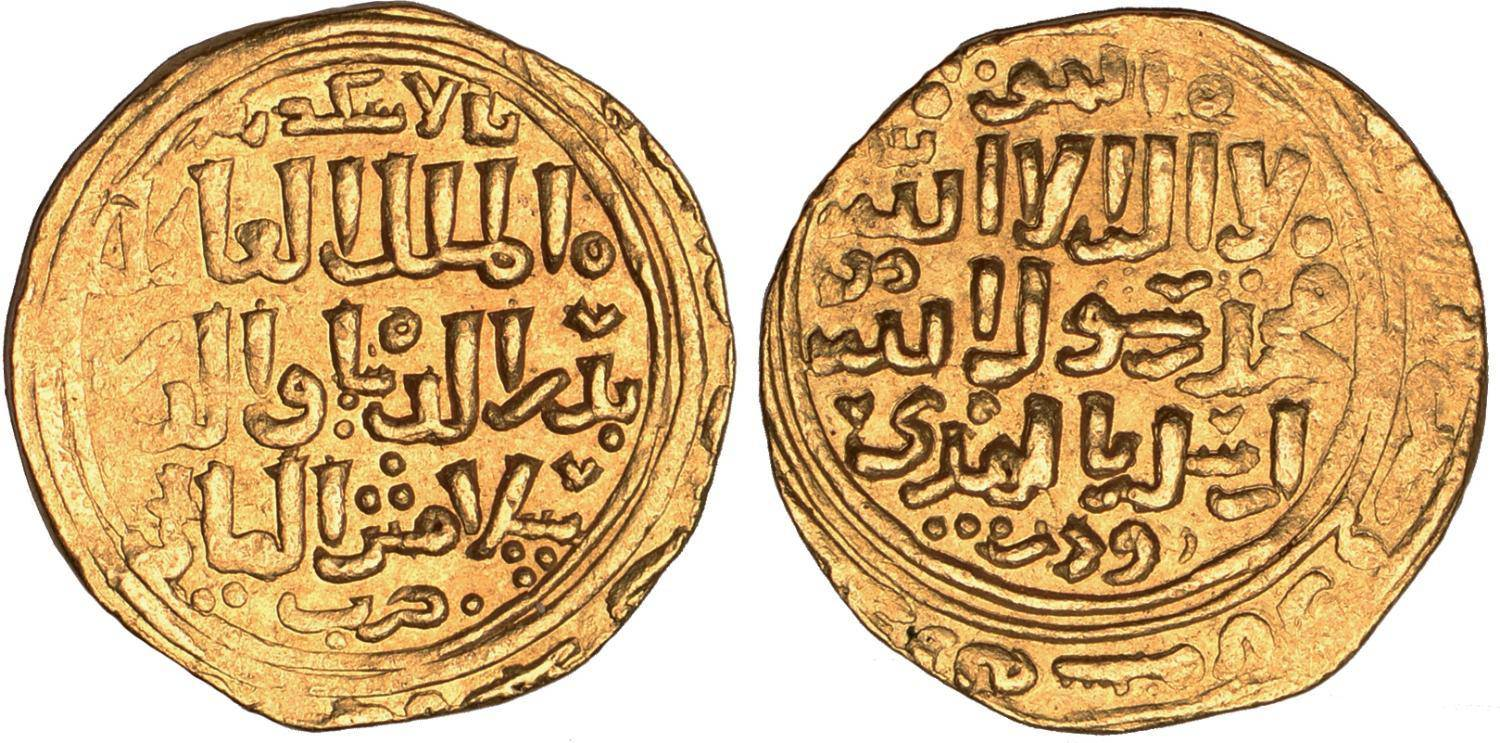
- Gold dinar struck in Alexandria in 678 AH during the reign of the Mamluk Sultan Solamish

Sultan of Egypt
- Reign: August 1279 – November 1279
- Predecessor: Al-Said Barakah
- Successor: Al-Mansur Qalawun
- Regent: Al-Mansur Qalawun
- Born: 1272; Cairo, Egypt
- Died: 1291 (aged 18–19); Constantinople
- Royal name: al-Malik al-Adil Badr al-Din Solamish (Arabic: الملك العادل بدر الدين سُلامش)
- House: Zahiri
- Dynasty: Bahri
- Father: al-Zahir Baibars al-Bunduqdari
- Mother: Iltutmish Khatun
- Religion: Islam

Badr al-Din Solamish (1272–1291; Arabic: بدر الدين سُلامش, royal name: al-Malik al-Adil Badr al-Din Solamish (Arabic: الملك العادل بدر الدين سُلامش)) was a Turkic Sultan of Egypt in 1279. Born in Cairo, he was the son of Baybars, a military leader and sultan of Egypt.

== Biography ==
Upon Baibars' death, his son al-Said Barakah took power, but as he was replacing his father's amirs with his own, three of the more powerful ones banded together and forced Barakah to abdicate after only two years. Barakah was replaced by the seven-year-old Solamish, with Qalawun, one of the amirs who had forced Barakah to abdicate, as guardian. A few months later, Solamish was deposed by Qalawun, who took the title of sultan for himself. He was later sent along with his brother Al-Masoud Khadir to join Barakah in Al-Karak in late 1279. However, Solamish and Al-Masoud Khadir were allowed to return to Cairo, to be later deported again with their mother to Constantinople, during the reign of Sultan Al-Ashraf Khalil.

He died in Constantinople in 1291. In 1297, his corpse was taken to be buried in Cairo, as his sister demanded from her husband, Sultan Lajin.

== Sources ==
- Reuven Amitai-Preiss (1995), Mongols and Mamluks: The Mamluk-Īlkhānid War, 1260-1281, pp. 179-225. Cambridge University Press, ISBN 0-521-46226-6.

Solamish Bahri dynasty Cadet branch of the Mamluk Sultanate Born: 1272 Died: 1291
Regnal titles
Preceded by Al-Said Barakah	Sultan of Egypt and Syria; August 1279 – November 1279 with Al-Mansur Qalawun	Succeeded by Al-Mansur Qalawun
