= Al-Ashraf Khalil =

Sultan of Egypt and Syria (r. 1290–1293)

Khalil
- Al-Malik al-Ashraf
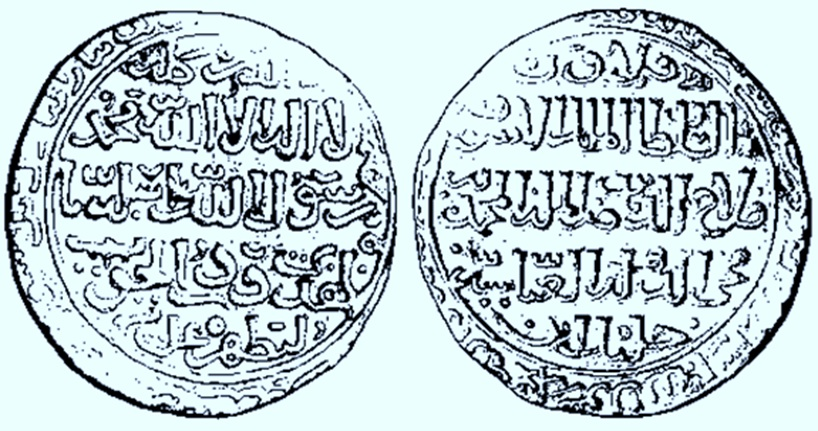
- Coinage of al-Ashraf Khalil

Sultan of Egypt and Syria
- Reign: 12 November 1290 – 14 December 1293
- Coronation: 1290 Cairo citadel, Egypt
- Predecessor: Al-Mansur Qalawun
- Successor: An-Nasir Muhammad
- Born: c. 1260s Cairo, Mamluk Sultanate
- Died: 14 December 1293 (age early 30s or younger); Turuja, Mamluk Sultanate (today in Beheira Governorate, Egypt)
- Consort: Ardukin
- Issue: Two daughters
Names
- Al-Malik al-Ashraf Salah ad-Din Khalil ibn Qalawun
- House: Qalawunid dynasty
- Dynasty: Bahri
- Father: Al-Mansur Qalawun
- Mother: Qutqutiya
- Religion: Islam

Al-Malik Al-Ashraf Salāh ad-Dīn Khalil ibn Qalawūn (Arabic: الملك الأشرف صلاح الدين خليل بن قلاوون; c. 1260s – 14 December 1293) was the eighth Turkic Bahri Mamluk sultan, succeeding his father Qalawun. He served from 12 November 1290 until his assassination in December 1293. He was well known for conquering the last of the Crusader states in Palestine after the siege of Acre in 1291. While walking with a friend, Khalil was attacked and assassinated by Baydara (his commander in chief) and his followers, who was then killed under the orders of Kitbugha.

== Early life ==
Khalil's exact year of birth is not known, although according to the Mamluk-era historian al-Safadi, he died "in his thirties or less". He was the second son of Sultan Qalawun (r. 1279–1290) and his mother was a woman named Qutqutiya. Khalil had three brothers, as-Salih Ali, an-Nasir Muhammad and Ahmad, and two sisters. In 1284, Khalil married Ardukin, the daughter of Sayf ad-Din Nukih ibn Bayan, a Mongol emir of Qalawun. As-Salih Ali, al-Ashraf Khalil's brother, married Ardukin's sister, and both wives were chosen by Qalawun's second wife because of their Mongol ethnicity, which was considered prestigious by the Mamluks. Khalil had two daughters with Ardukin, who are unnamed in the Mamluk sources.

Qalawun had proclaimed as-Salih Ali as his heir apparent in 1280. From that point on, as-Salih Ali's name was added next to Qalawun's name in treaties. Khalil's name also began to be added to treaties in the regal style of "al-Malik al-Ashraf" starting in 1285 in the treaty between Qalawun and the king of Lesser Armenia. When as-Salih Ali died in 1288, Qalawun appointed al-Ashraf Khalil as his co-sultan. While al-Ashraf Khalil's name was read alongside Qalawun's name in the khutbah (Friday prayer sermon) and the emirs swore their allegiance to him, Qalawun did not sign the ahd (diploma of investiture) confirming al-Ashraf Khalil's appointment. The reason for Qalawun's apparent hesitance is not clear, but he may have considered al-Ashraf Khalil unsuitable for the sultanate or was wary of the enmity between al-Ashraf Khalil and the na'ib as-saltana (viceroy of Egypt), Emir Husam ad-Din Turuntay, who had been a strong advocate for as-Salih Ali's accession.

== Reign ==
Al-Ashraf Khalil succeeded Qalawun following the latter's death on 9 November 1290. He prevented Qalawun's burial for two months, either as a precaution to ensure his smooth succession or to wait until Qalawun's mausoleum was completed. With his ascendancy, al-Ashraf Khalil absorbed his father's roughly 6,000 Mansuriyya mamluks into his own 1,200-strong, mostly Circassian, mamluk corps, the Ashrafiyya. The Mansuriyya were the most powerful mamluk regiment in the sultanate and al-Ashraf Khalil sought to co-opt them.

In the royal procession following al-Ashraf Khalil's accession to the throne, Turuntay launched an assassination attempt against al-Ashraf Khalil, but it failed. Instead, al-Ashraf Khalil had Turuntay imprisoned in the Cairo Citadel. After being heavily tortured for three days, Turuntay was put to death in November. He was briefly replaced by Emir Sanjar al-Shuja'i al-Mansuri until the latter was dispatched to Damascus and replaced by Emir Baydara. Al-Ashraf Khalil made Baydara na'ib as-saltana and atabeg al-asakir (commander in chief). The frequent exchanging of offices between the Mansuri emirs and their frequent imprisonment and release was a phenomenon that marked al-Ashraf Khalil's three-year reign. According to historian Amir Mazor, "Al-Ashraf Khalil's policy toward the Mansuriyya was totally arbitrary, haphazard and lacked long-term political vision", but he nonetheless did not target the Mansuri mamluks as a faction and did not replace Mansuri officeholders with his Ashrafi mamluks.

=== Conquest of Acre ===
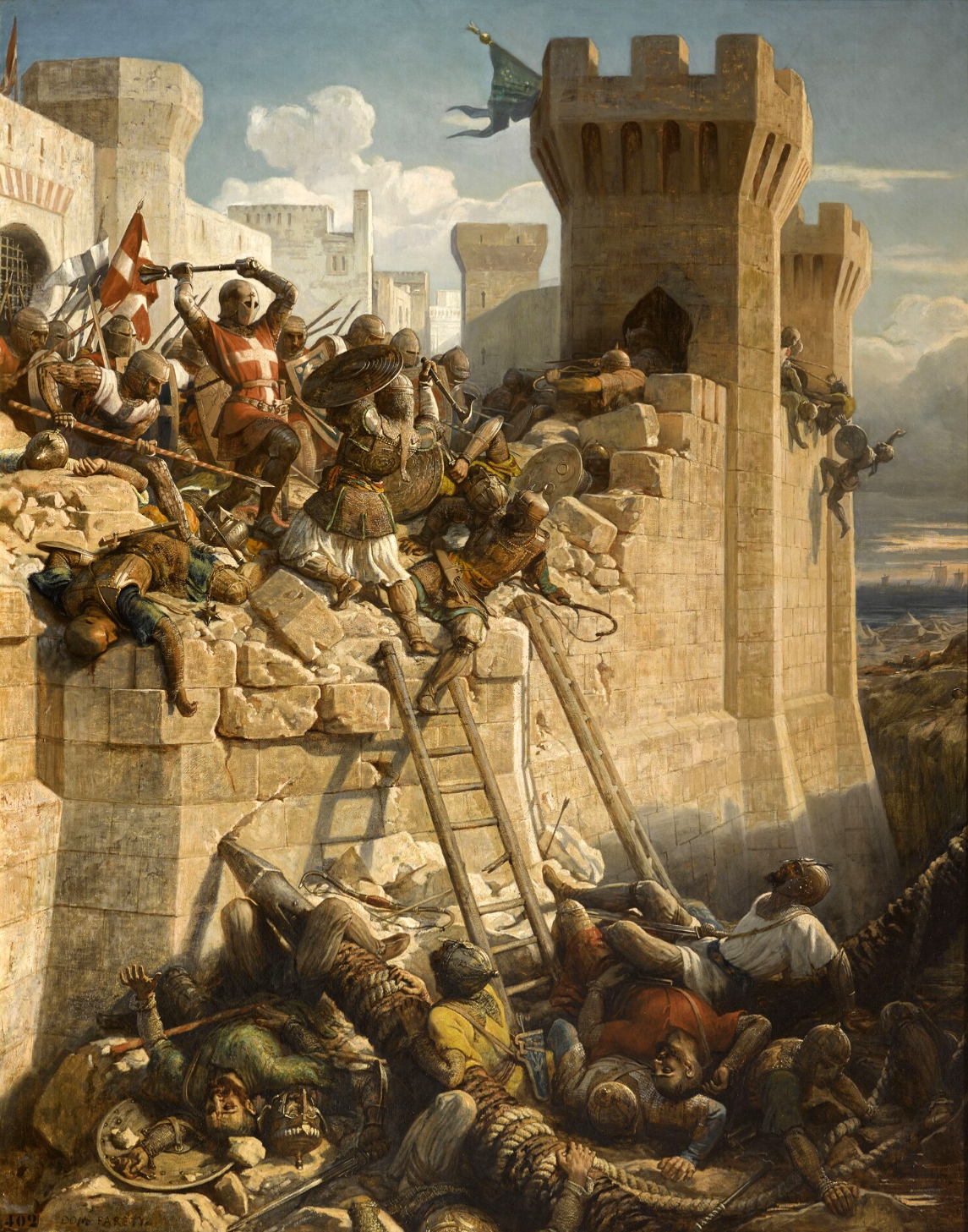
An 1840 painting depicting the 1291 Siege of Acre

Qalawun had conquered the County of Tripoli in 1289 and made clear his determination to end the Crusader presence in Syria. In November 1290, he began his march toward Acre, the capital of the Kingdom of Jerusalem, but died outside of Cairo shortly after. With the siege plans having already been prepared by Qalawun and his lieutenants, al-Ashraf Khalil resumed his father's offensive on 2 March 1291. As he led the Mamluk army of Egypt, he sent orders to the Mamluk emirs of Syria, including the sultanate's Ayyubid vassals in Hama under al-Muzaffar III Mahmud, to assemble their mangonels and head toward Acre. The other Syrian Mamluk armies were from Damascus (led by Lajin), Tripoli (led by Bilban) and al-Karak (led by Baibars al-Dawadar). There are no reliable figures for the size of the Mamluk army, but it was likely a significantly larger force than that of the Crusader defenders of Acre.

In May 1291, al-Ashraf Khalil's army launched the assault against Acre. Heavy fighting ensued with the Knights Templar, which controlled the fortress. By 17 June, the Mamluks captured Acre, and a number of its inhabitants fled by sea. Remaining Crusader defenders held out in some of the towers in the city, but after further fighting they surrendered. Al-Ashraf Khalil ordered the execution of the remaining defenders and inhabitants. After abundant amounts of loot were plundered from the city by the Mamluk troops, al-Ashraf Khalil had Acre's fortifications destroyed.

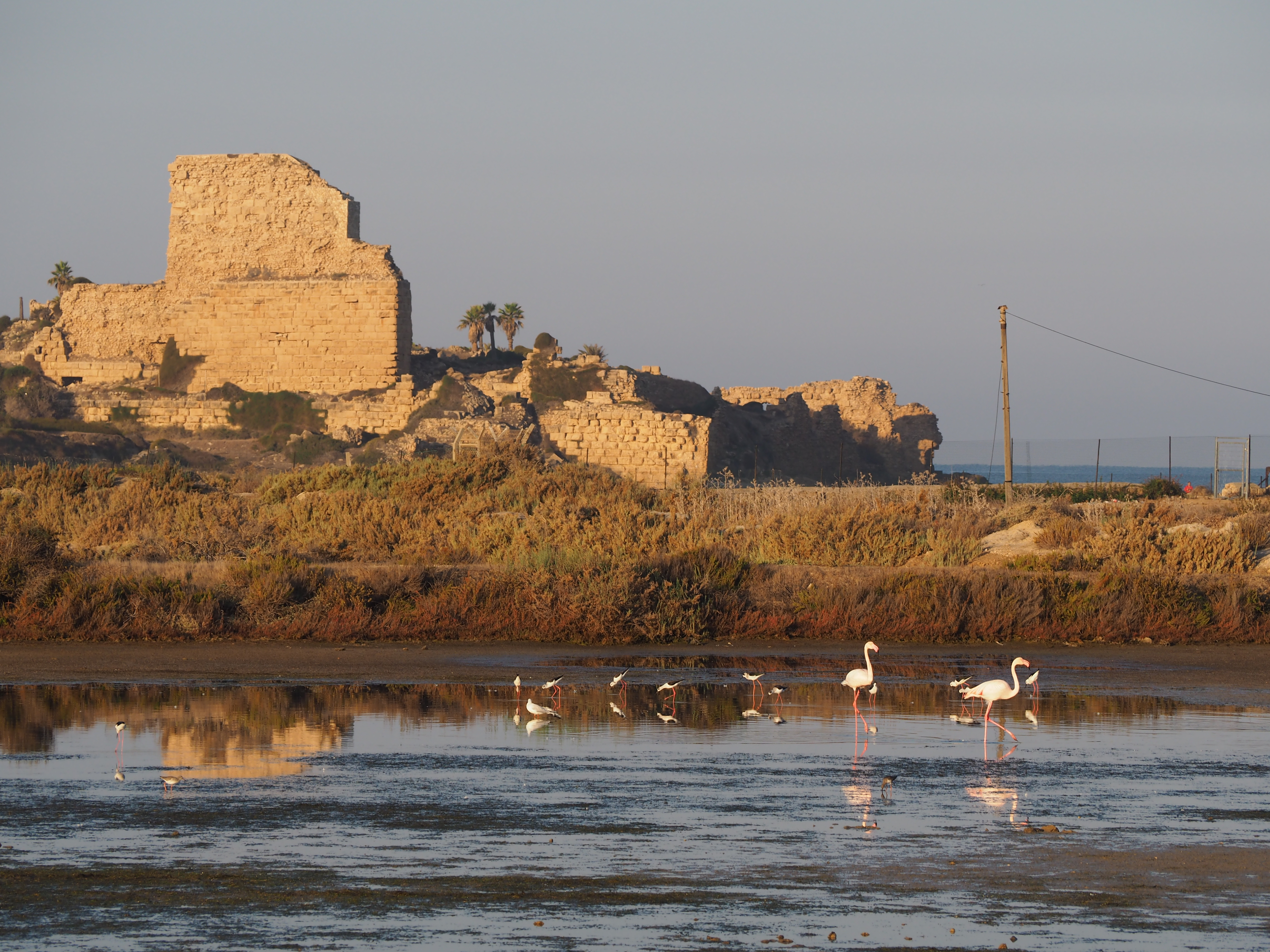
Remains of the Templar fortress of Atlit, the last Crusader outpost in Syria conquered by al-Ashraf Khalil's forces

=== Capture of other Crusader fortresses ===
The news of the conquest of Acre reached Damascus and Cairo. Al-Ashraf Khalil entered the decorated city of Damascus with Franks chained at the feet and the captured crusader standards which were carried upside-down as a sign of their defeat. After celebrating his victory in Damascus, Khalil left for Cairo which was also decorated and celebrating. Arriving at Cairo, he ordered the release of Philip Mainebeuf and the men who accompanied him to Cairo earlier.

Following Acre's capture, al-Ashraf Khalil and his generals proceeded to wrest control of the remaining Crusader-held fortresses along the Syrian coast. Within weeks, the Mamluks conquered Tyre, Sidon, Beirut, Haifa and Tartus. In August, the last Crusader outpost in Syria, the Templar fortress of Atlit south of Acre, was taken and on 7 August, al-Ashraf Khalil returned to Cairo in triumph as the "final victor in the long struggle with the Crusaders", according to historian Peter Malcolm Holt.

In 1292, Al-Ashraf Khalil accompanied by his vizier Ibn al-Sal'us arrived in Damascus and then travelled via Aleppo to besiege the castle of Qal'at ar-Rum (Castle of the Romans) and was known as Hromgla in Armenian. Qal'at ar-Rum, which was the seat of the Patriarch of Armenia, was besieged by more than 30 catapults and was captured after 30 days by Khalil, who renamed it Qal'at al-Muslimin (Castle of the Muslims). Khalil left Emir al-Shuja‘i at the castle and returned to Damascus with prisoners. The population of Damascus bid farewell to the victorious Sultan on his way to Cairo at night with thousands of lighted candles. The Sultan entered Cairo through the Victory Gate (Bab al-Nasr) and was greeted by the celebrating population, also with thousands of lighted candles .

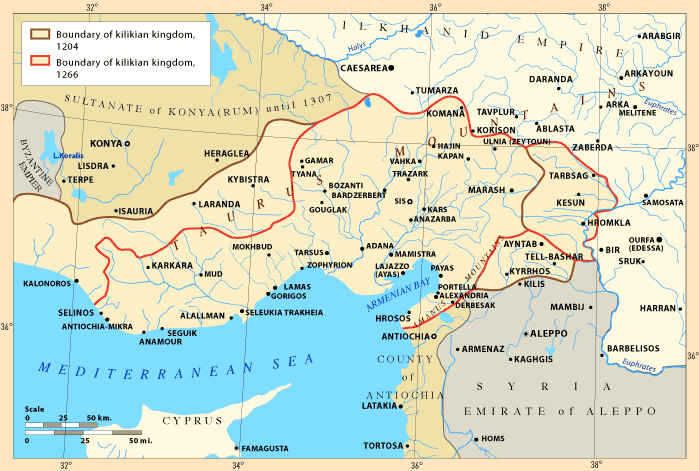
The Kingdom of Cilician Armenia, 1199–1375.

The Sultan returned to Damascus and assembled an army to invade Sis, the capital of the Armenian Kingdom of Cilicia, but an Armenian embassy in Damascus had made terms with him first. Til Hemdun, Marash and Behesni were given to the Sultan in order to maintain peace. The Armenian kingdom had thus began to diminish much like its allied Crusader states.

The crusaders' kingdom of Jerusalem had already been destroyed by Saladin, Baibars and Qalawun, and Louis IX's Seventh Crusade against Egypt ended in a complete failure, but the crusaders tried to keep their strongholds on the Syrian coast intact, hoping to be able one day to recapture what they had lost. Pope Nicholas IV tried to act but he died in 1292, and the European kings, who became involved in internal conflicts and struggles, became unable to organize new effective crusades. As for the Templars, they were accused of heresy in Europe and badly persecuted by King Philip IV of France and Pope Clement V.

=== Sack of Dongola ===
After the death of the Sultan of Egypt, Qalawun, and the ascension of his son, Sultan Khalil, to the throne of Egypt, the Kingdom of Makuria which had been conquered by the emirs Izz al-Din al-Kawrani, Izz al-Din Aidmar and Sanjar al-Masrouri in the Fourth battle of Dongola as ordered by Qalawun, and it annually sent the taxes and royalties imposed on it by Egypt in accordance with the ancient Baqt agreement. The Makurian king Samamoun thought that the new Egyptian Sultan was weak and young, and this was a great misconception on his part, and after a letter that was completely deceptive to al-Ashraf Khalil in which he said that due to the attacks of the Egyptian army on his kingdom during the reign of Qalawun and Baybars, the treasury of the Kingdom of Makuria has become empty and he will not be able to pay the imposed taxes and royalties. The Egyptian Sultan al-Ashraf Khalil was known for his temper, so he sent a letter full of threats and promises to the Makurian king, a letter that struck terror in Samamoun’s heart to the point that he described his country as being ruled by women. However, these words did not fool Sultan Khalil, who went on to order the movement of the Egyptian army under the leadership of emir Izz al-Din al-Afram, who moved from Cairo and arrived in Makuria and won a decisive victory over the Makurian forces. He entered the capital, Dongola, and plundered it completely. King Samamoun fled from Makuria as he had fled before in the campaigns of Qalawun.

=== Threatening the Republic of Venice with invasion ===
In 1292, Venetian pirates kidnapped Egyptian sailors and merchants in the Mediterranean Sea. This act angered al-Ashraf Khalil’s to the point that he began to actually think about invading the Republic of Venice, becoming the only Egyptian Sultan who thought about that. It was logical at the time that he would think about invading Venice, as the Egyptian army at that time was considered one of the strongest armies in the world and in less than 3 years, he eliminated the last 8 Crusader states in Palestine and invaded the Armenian kingdom of Cilicia. The Sultan, in light of his thoughts about invading Venice, gave orders to the Egyptian Navy to arrest any ship belonging to the Republic of Venice that entered the Egyptian coast, even if for the purpose of trade. In fact, the Egyptian Navy arrested Venetian ships that landed in Alexandria, and all their goods were seized and placed in the Egyptian treasury. The Sultan ordered the Venetian sailors and merchants to be placed in prisons. This made the Republic of Venice speak officially with the Sultanate of Egypt, and they sent a high-ranking official delegation with a lot of gifts. The delegation, when it met al-Ashraf Khalil, completely denied any relationship linking them to the pirates who kidnapped the Egyptian sailors, and that they did not know anything about this subject. Sultan al-Ashraf Khalil was very mad and was determined and told them that the Venetian prisoners will not be released except when the Egyptian sailors and merchants return. Later they reached an agreement in the end that the Venetians would pay a very large ransom to release their captives, in addition to that they would hand over the pirates to Egypt and return the kidnapped Egyptians. After that, the Venetians asked the Kingdom of Aragon to mediate with them in Egypt, and a peace treaty was concluded between the Sultanate of Egypt and the Republic of Venice through the mediation of the Spanish Kingdom of Aragon.

=== Incomplete Cyprus invasion ===
In late 1292, Cypriots kidnapped Egyptian sailors in the Mediterranean Sea. Al-Ashraf, who was known for his extreme pride and temper, ordered immediately to prepare and build 100 huge warships to invade all of Cyprus. He preferred to oversee the construction of these ships himself, and every now and then he would visit the ports and repeat the same sentence, with anger in his face:

"Cyprus... Cyprus... to the grave"

This means that Cyprus would be buried, but Al-Ashraf died before an invasion of Cyprus could be launched and not until the era of al-Ashraf Barsbay did the Mamluks launch a campaign against Cyprus.

=== Mongol threat ===
In 1293, Mongol ruler Gaykhatu sent his messengers with a threatening letter to the Sultan al-Ashraf Khalil saying:

"The Khan wishes to enter Aleppo and reside in it, it belongs to the conquests of his father Hulagu Khan by his sword, if you do not allow that, then he will cross to the Levant."

Al-Ashraf Khalil immediately responded to them, while smiling and said:

"Alhamdulillah my brother the Khan agreed to what was in my mind and I talked about it with my princes that I request Baghdad from my brother, so if he does not allow that, I rode and conquered it with my troops, ravaged his country, killed his men, took it by force and appointed a representative there. Baghdad is the house of Islam and I wish to return it back to Islam but let him know we will see who enters whose country's first."

He took them out to where he had dropped them off and immediately wrote to the deputies of the Levant to prepare the accommodation and to get the soldiers ready to cross the Euphrates River and invade Baghdad. He presented to the princes and soldiers of Egypt to put on the war machine and come to Salah al-Din Square. Mongol messengers were sent to watch the soldiers. Most of the people of Cairo and Egypt went out to see the parade of the soldiers. It was a memorable day. The Sultan rode after the noon call to prayer, wearing a qarqal (an iron plate covered with brocade), and a keffiyeh over his head, and a shattaf in his hand. He entered the field, followed by the princes, one by one, with the latest war machines on them, and each of them carrying a spear on their robes. They fought and fled, displaying their war flags, until the afternoon call to prayer came. This was the third military parade he presented during his sultanate. When their matter was over, he came down, took off his clothes, and made himself ready. He summoned the Mongol messengers and said to them:

"Inform my brother Gaykhatu that whoever has such soldiers with him does not stop entering your country or the country of others. I swear on my father's grave, I will enter his place and destroy the homes of all the Mongols and make it an Islamic country until the Day of Resurrection, unless my time comes!"

Then he sent them back, and wrote urging the deputies, but his death was soon before he reached his hope following that.

=== Future ambitions ===
Al-Ashraf Khalil once stated that he has plans of invading Constantinople, Persia and Iraq:

"I am the king of the world and the sultan of the earth. God willing, we will conquer the East (Persia), the Rums (Byzantines; Constantinople), and Iraq, and we will possess the countries from the setting of the sun to the rising of the sun, and God will support me."

=== Domestic conflicts and assassination ===
Militarily, Al-Ashraf Khalil possessed the vigor and capability of two of his predecessors, Baibars and his father Qalawun. But many Emirs disliked him. He started his reign by executing and imprisoning a few prominent Emirs of his father, among them the vice-Sultan Turuntay. During the battle for Acre he arrested Hosam ad-Din Lajin and later after he returned to Cairo he executed Sunqur al-Ashqar, (Note: Shams ad-Din Sunqur al-Ashqar, was a prominent Emir and one of the most devoted Bahri Emirs since days of Sultan Baibars. He was taken prisoner by the Armenians and was freed in exchange for Leo the son of King Hethum I who was captured during the invasion of the Armenian Kingdom of Cilicia in 1266. During the reign of Baibars' son Solmish he was the deputy of the Sultan in Damascus. During the reign of Qalawun he proclaimed himself a Sultan while in Damascus, taking the royal name al-Malik al-Kamil. He fought a few battles against Qalawun's Emirs but was pardoned later after he joined Qalawun's army against the Mongols.) and a few Emirs. Khalil continued his father's policy of replacing Turkish Mamluks with Circassians, a policy which contributed in the intensification of the rivalry among the Mamluks. After his victories against the Franks, arrogance got hold of al-Ashraf Khalil, he treated the Emirs roughly and began to sign messages and documents with the letter "KH" only. In addition, his Vizier Ibn al-Salus was envied by many Emirs and by the vice-Sultan Baydara in particular. Ibn al-Salus who, originally, was neither a Mamluk nor an Emir but a merchant from Damascus, became the most influential official during the reign of Khalil. While Al-Ashraf was rough on the Emirs, he was very generous towards Ibn al-Salus who did not treat the Emirs with respect. Ibn al-Salus was involved in the unjustly persecution of the supreme judge of Egypt Ibn Bint al-A'az, as he was involved in provoking the Sultan against Baydara on several occasions.

In December 1293, Al-Ashraf Khalil, accompanied by Ibn al-Salus, Baydara and other Emirs went to Turug in northern Egypt on a bird-hunting expedition. He sent Ibn Al-Salus to the nearby city of Alexandria to bring materials and to collect the taxes. Arriving at Alexandria, Ibn Al-Salus found out that the deputies of Baydara had already taken everything. On receiving a message from Ibn Al-Salus with this news, Al-Ashraf summoned Baydara to his Dihlis and insulted and threatened him in the presence of other Emirs. The distressed Baydar left the Dihlis and called Lajin, Qara Sunqur and other Emirs and together they decided to kill the Sultan. On 14 December, while the Sultan was walking with his friend Emir Shihab ad-Din Ahmad he was attacked and assassinated by Baydara and his followers. The Emirs who struck the Sultan after Baydara were Hosam ad-Din Lajin and Bahadir Ras Nubah followed by other Emirs. After the assassination of Al-Ashraf Khalil, Baydara and his followers went to the Dihliz and proclaimed Baydara the new Sultan. But Baydara was soon arrested by the Sultani Mamluks and Emirs. (Note: Before the arrest of Baydara he was asked by Baibars, Emir of Jandar, whether other Emirs knew about his plan to kill Al-Ashraf. He answered: "Yes, I killed him according to their advice and under their eyes" then he added the reasons for killing him which included: "He did not respect the Emirs and the Mamluks of his father. He made Ibn Al-Salus a Vizier. He arrested Izz ad-Din al-Afram and executed Sunqur al-Ashqar and others. He promoted his Mamluks to the rank of Emir". When he was asked whether Kitbugha knew about his plan, he replied: "Yes, he was the first one to suggest it.") Baydara was killed by the Sultani Emirs led by Kitbugha and Baibars al-Jashnikir and his head was sent to Cairo. Ibn al-Salus was arrested in Alexandria and was sent to Cairo where he was mistreated and at last beaten to death. The Emirs who were involved in the assassination of Al-Ashraf Khalil were severely punished and executed. Lajin and Qara Sunqur fled and disappeared. (Note: Lajin appeared sometime after the assassination of Al-Ashraf Khalil. He was pardoned by al-Nasir Muhammad who became the new Sultan.)

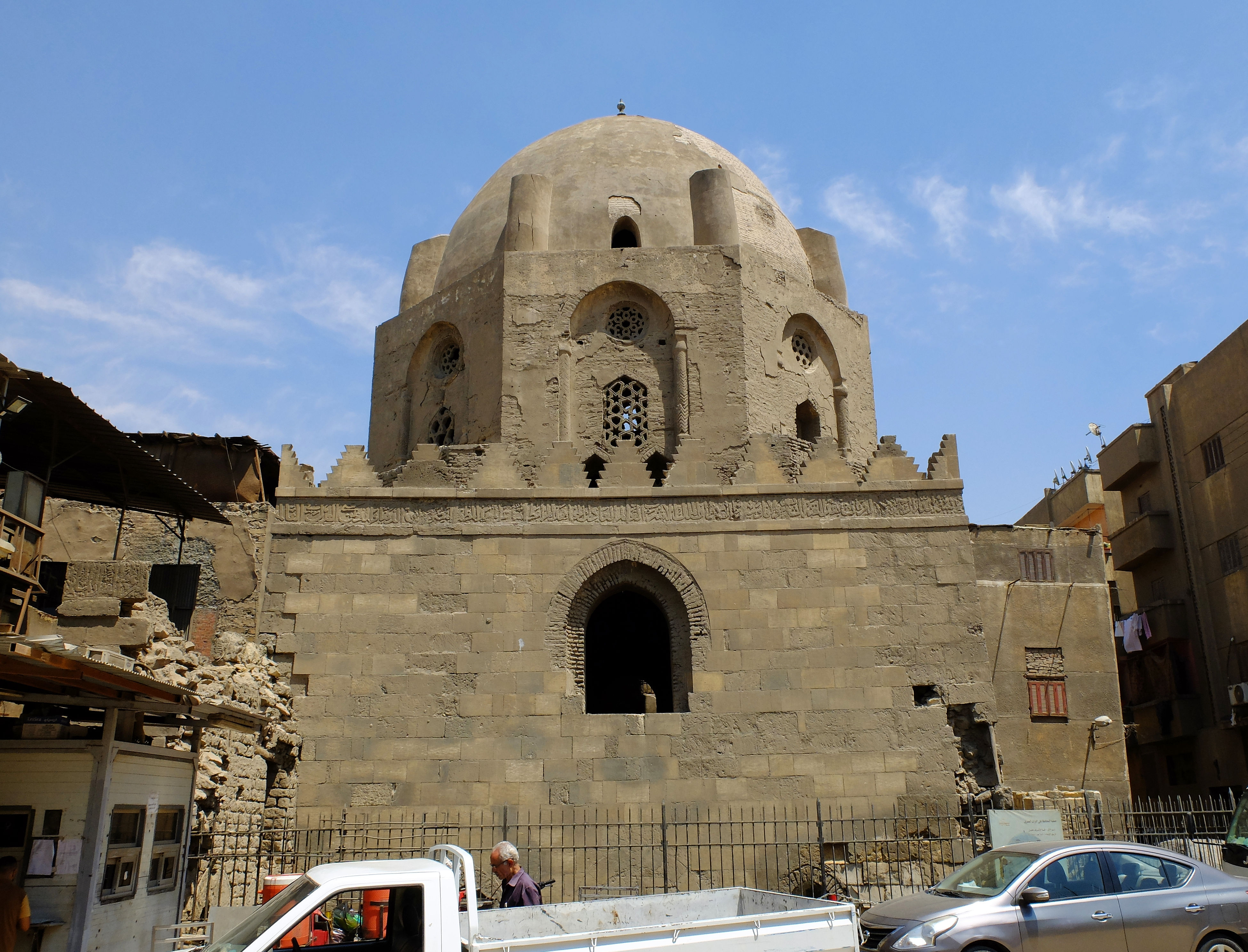
Mausoleum of al-Ashraf Khalil in Cairo, built in 1288

After the death of Al-Ashraf Khalil, the Emirs decided to install his 9-year-old brother Al-Nasir Muhammad as the new Sultan with Kitbugha as vice-Sultan and al-Shuja‘i as the new Vizier. But the death of Al-Ashraf Khalil was concealed for some time. While Al-Ashraf was dead, his brother Al-Nasir Muhammad was proclaimed Vice-Sultan and heir. A message from Egypt to the Syrian Emirs said: "I appointed my brother al-Malik al-Nasir Muhammad as my Vicegerent and heir so that when I go to fight the enemy he replaces me ". As soon as everything was under control the death of Al-Ahraf Khalil was revealed to the public in Egypt and Syria. He was buried in a mausoleum attached to a madrasa that he commissioned and built in 1288 (prior to his accession to the throne). His funerary complex, located in the Southern Cemetery of Cairo, is partly ruined today, though the domed structure over his tomb remains standing.

Al-Ashraf Khalil ruled about three years and two months. He had two daughters. Besides being remembered as the conqueror of Acre, he was remembered by Muslim historians as an intelligent Sultan who was fond of reading and learning.

== Coinage ==
Coins of al-Ashraf Khalil were unique in Mamluk coinage history. New kinds of titles were inscribed on his coins, including: al-Sultan al-Malik al-Ashraf Salah al-Din Nasir al-Milah al-Muhamadiyah Muhyyi al-Dawalah al-Abasiyah (The Sultan King al-Ashraf Salah al-Din the Promoter of the Muhammadan Nation and the Revitalizer of the Abbasid Caliphate) and al-Sultan al-Malik al-Ashraf Salah al-Donya wa al-Din Qasim Amir al-mu'minin (The Sultan King al-Ashraf reform of temporal world and faith sharer of the Emir of the faithful), "Emir of the faithful" being the title of the Abbasid Caliph. His father Qalawun was also mentioned on Al-Ashraf's coins as: Mawlana al-Sultan al-Malik al-Mansur (Our benefactor the Sultan King al-Mansur).

== See also ==
- Kipchaks

== Bibliography ==
- Asili, B. (1992). Al-Zahir Baibars and the End of the Old Crusades. Beirut: Dar Alnafaes.
- Holt, Peter Malcolm (1986). The Age of the Crusades: The Near East from the Eleventh Century to 1517. Addison Wesley Longman Limited. ISBN 9781317871521.
- Ludolphi, Rectoris Ecclesiæ Parochialis in suchem, de itinere Terræ Sanctæ, University of Michigan 1851
- Mahdi, Shafik (2008). Mamalik Misr wa Alsham (Mamluks of Egypt and the Levant) (in Arabic). Beirut: Aldar Alarabiya.
- Mannheim, Ivan (2001). Syria & Lebanon Handbook. Footprint Travel Guides. ISBN 978-1-900949-90-3.
- Mazor, Amir (2015). The Rise and Fall of a Muslim Regiment: The Mansuriyya in the First Mamluk Sultanate, 678/1279–741/1341. Vandenhoeck & Ruprecht Unipress and Bonn University Press. ISBN 9783847004240.
- Northrup, Linda (1998). From Slave to Sultan: The Career of Al-Manṣūr Qalāwūn and the Consolidation of Mamluk Rule in Egypt and Syria (678-689 A.H./1279-1290 A.D.). Franz Steiner Verlag. ISBN 9783515068611.
- Runciman, Steven (1987). A History of the Crusades, Volume 3. Penguin Books.
- Stewart, Angus Donal (2001). The Armenian Kingdom and the Mamluks: War and Diplomacy During the Reigns of Hetʻum II (1289-1307). Brill. ISBN 9789004122925.
- Clifford, Winslow William (2013). Conermann, Stephan (ed.). State Formation and the Structure of Politics in Mamluk Syro-Egypt, 648-741 A.H./1250-1340 C.E. Bonn University Press. ISBN 9783847100911.

=== Primary sources ===
- Abu al-Fida, The Concise History of Humanity. (The historian Abu al-Fida took part in the sieges of Tripoli and Acre.)
- Al-Maqrizi, Al-Mawaiz wa al-'i'tibar bi Dhikr al-Khitat wa al-'athar, Matabat Aladab, Cairo, 1996, ISBN 977-241-175-X
- Al-Maqrizi, Al-Selouk Leme'refatt Dewall al-Melouk, Dar al-Kotob, 1997.
- Bohn, Henry G., The Road to Knowledge of the Return of Kings, Chronicles of the Crusades, AMS Press, 1969.
- (In French) Bouriant, Urbain, Description Topographique et Historique de l'Egypte, Paris, 1895
- Ibn Taghri, al-Nujum al-Zahirah Fi Milook Misr wa al-Qahirah, Dar al-Kotob, Beirut, 1992
- Ludolph of Suchem, Description of the Holy Land and of the Way Thither. Translated by Aubrey Stewart. London: Palestine Pilgrims' Text Society, 1895. Reprinted in James Brundage, The Crusades: A Documentary History, Milwaukee, WI: Marquette University Press 1962
- William Popper, Yusef, History of Egypt, 1382–1469 AD. Translated by Abu L-Mahasin ibn Taghri Birdi, University of California Press 1954
- The Templar of Tyre, Chronicle (Getes des Chiprois), Published by Crawford, P., Ashgate Publishing. Ltd, Cyprus 2003. ISBN 1-84014-618-4

Al-Ashraf Khalil Bahri dynasty Cadet branch of the Mamluk Sultanate Born: c.1260 Died: 14 December 1293
Regnal titles
Preceded by Al-Mansur Qalawun	Sultan of Egypt and Syria; November 1290 – December 1293	Succeeded by An-Nasir Muhammad
