= Al-Sa'id Baraka =

Sultan of Egypt and Syria (r. 1277–1279)

- al-Malik al-Sa'id Nasir al-Din
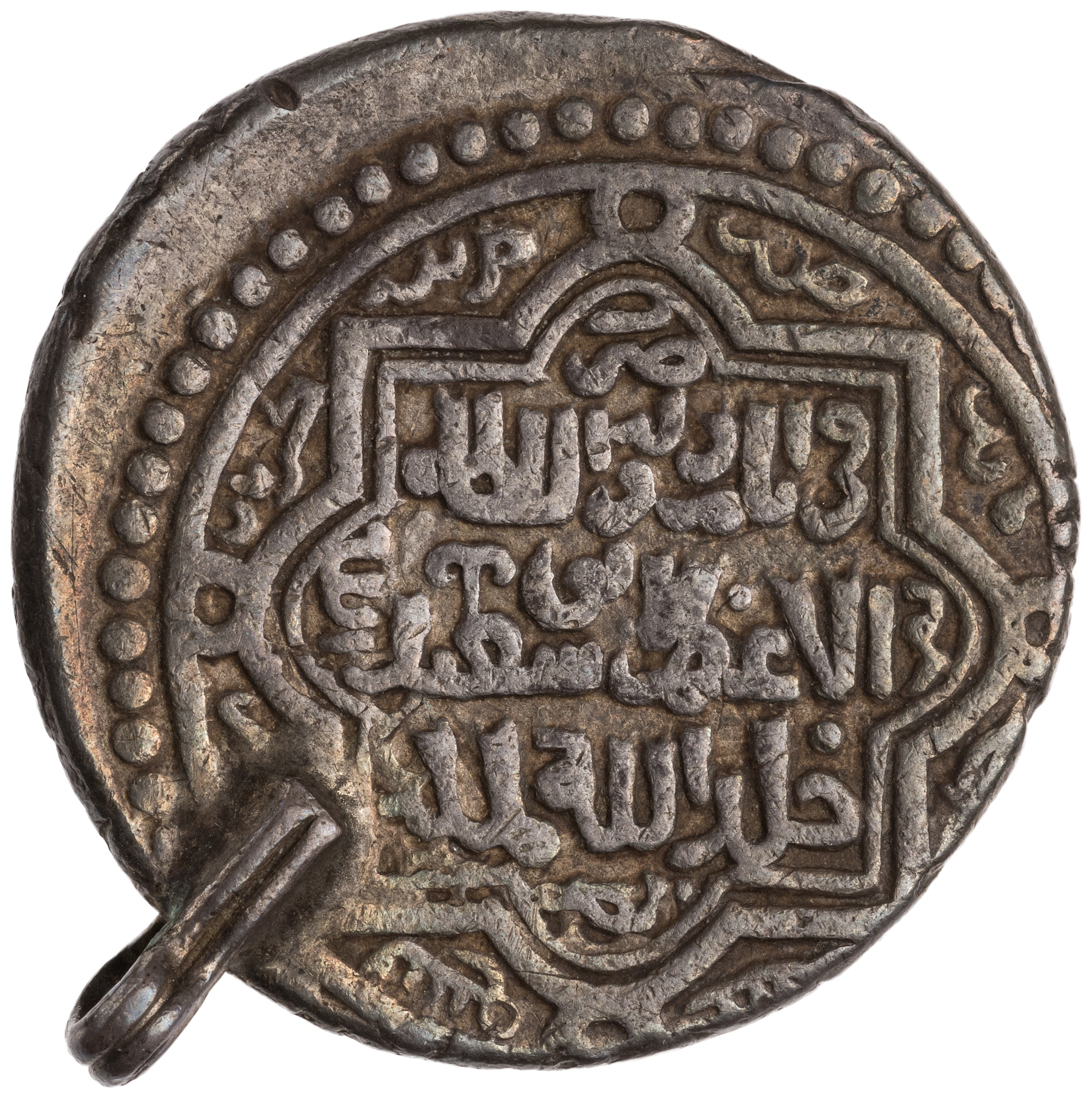
- A dinar of Mamluk Sultan Baraka minted in Alexandria in 1277/78

Sultan of Egypt
- Reign: 3 July 1277 – August 1279
- Predecessor: Al-Zahir Baibars al-Bunduqdari
- Successor: Badr al-Din Solamish
- Born: 1260; Cairo, Egypt
- Died: 1280 (aged 19–20); Al Karak, Jordan
- Spouse: Ghaziya Khatun
- Birth name: Muhammed Baraka Qan محمد بركة قان
- Royal name: al-Malik al-Sa'id Nasir al-Din Baraka الملك السعيد ناصر الدين بركة
- House: Zahiri
- Dynasty: Bahri
- Father: al-Zahir Baibars al-Bunduqdari
- Religion: Islam

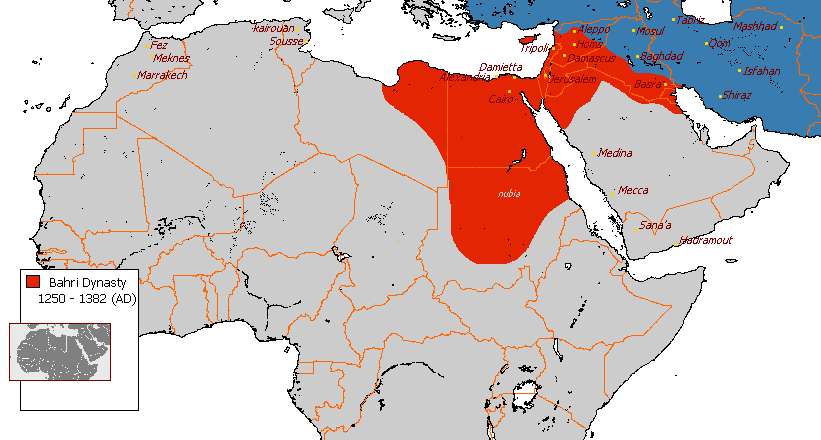
Dominion of Bahri Mamluks ( red )

Al-Sa'id Baraka (1260–1280; birthname: Muhammed Baraka Qan (Arabic: محمد بركة قان), royal name: al-Malik al-Sa'id Nasir al-Din Baraka (الملك السعيد ناصر الدين بركة) was a Turkic Sultan who ruled from 1277 to 1279 after the death of his father Baibars. His mother was a daughter of Barka Khan, a former Khwarazmian emir.

Baraka was born in Cairo, Egypt. His succession went smoothly, and he set about limiting the power of the emirs from his father's administration. One, his father's viceroy, died under suspicious circumstances. Others were jailed and then released. In their place, Baraka promoted his own mamluks. He also sent Qalawun and Baysari, two of the most powerful emirs, to raid Cilician Armenia and Qal'at al-Rum in 1279, as a way of keeping them busy and away from the seat of power. Each had 10,000 troops. Baraka's plan was to have both of them arrested on their return, but another amir, Kuvenduk, warned them of the plan, and when they returned, Baraka was forced to abdicate. His seven-year-old brother Sulamish was placed on the throne in his place, under the guardianship of Qalawun, who became the effective sultan.

== Personal life ==
His only wife was Ghaziya Khatun. She was the daughter of Sultan Qalawun. She was betrothed to him on 28 May 1276, with a dowry of five thousand dinars. The wedding took place on 8 June 1277. She died in August 1288.

== Death ==
Exiled to Al Karak fortress, in Jordan, he died there in 1280.

Al-Sa'id Baraka Bahri dynasty Cadet branch of the Mamluk Sultanate Born: 1260 Died: 1280
Regnal titles
Preceded by Al-Zahir Baibars al-Bunduqdari	Sultan of Egypt and Syria; 3 July 1277 – August 1279	Succeeded by Badr al-Din Solamish
