= Fourth battle of Dongola =

Battle between Egyptian Sultanate and Kingdom of Makuria in Nubia

Battle of Dongola
- Part of the Mamluk-Makurian wars
Date	1287
Location	Dongola, in Makuria (Sudan)
Result	Mamluk victory
Territorial changes	Mamluk occupation of Dongola

Belligerents
Kingdom of Makuria	Mamluk Sultanate; Arab tribes of Sudan

Commanders and leaders
Shamamun of Makuria #	Izz al-Din al-Kawrani; Izz al-Din Aidmar; Sanjar al-Masruri

The Fourth battle of Dongola or the Second Conquest of Makuria (1287) was fought between the Mamluk Sultanate of Egypt and the Kingdom of Makuria resulting in a decisive Mamluk victory, capturing the Makurian capital Dongola, forcing the king Samamun to flee and placing a puppet on the Makurian throne.

== Background ==
In the year 1287, Sultan Qalawun decided to invade the Kingdom of Makuria and annex it to the Mamluk state militarily, after it had been politically dependent since it was conquered by the Mamluk forces during the reign of Sultan Baybars in the Battle of Dongola (1276).

Qalawun entrusted the task of commanding the army to Izz al-Din al-Kawrani, whom he trusted in his military ability. Qalawun informed al-Kawrani of the importance of this campaign. The Mamluk army moved towards Makuria divided into 3 parts, one led by Izz al-Din al-Kawrani, one led by Izz al-Din Aidmar, and one led by Sanjar al-Masruri.

== The Battle ==
When the Mamluks reached the first border of Makuria, all Makurian forces withdrew from it. The Makurian forces kept retreating until the Mamluk army reached Dongola, the Makurian capital. There, a violent battle took place between the Mamluks and the Makurians, which ended in a Mamluk victory. King Samamun of Makuria fled to the far south of Nubia out of fear, and the Mamluks appointed his nephew as governor of Makuria under the suzerainty of the Mamluk Sultanate. A garrison was left in Dongola to preserve Mamluk rule.
