= Rumkale =

Medieval fortress in present-day Turkey

- Yavuzeli, Gaziantep Province, Turkey
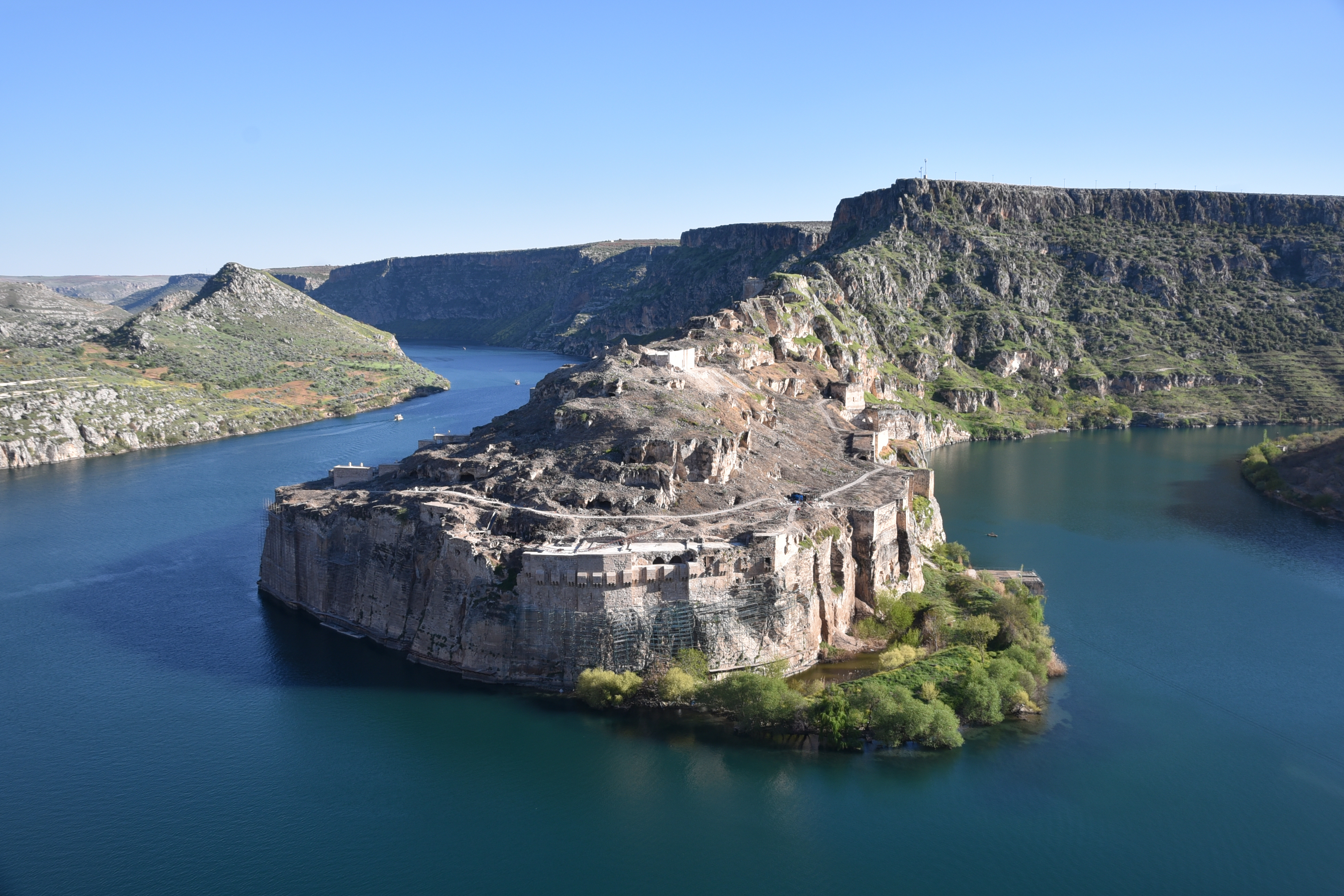
- The Rumkale Fortress

Site information
- Type: Fortress

Location
- Coordinates: 37°16′19″N 37°50′17″E

Site history
- Events: Council of Hromkla in 1179

Rumkale (lit. 'Roman Castle'; Armenian: Հռոմկլա, romanized: Hromgla) is a ruined fortress on the Euphrates, located in the province of Gaziantep and 50 km west of Şanlıurfa.

Although Rumkale is sometimes linked with places mentioned in ancient sources, the foundations of the structure can be traced back to the Byzantine rule the earliest, when the fortress was the seat of a Syriac Orthodox bishopric. Rumkale evolved into a town when its Armenian civilian population grew in the 11th century. The fortress slipped away from the Byzantine rule when Philaretos Brachamios (r. 1071–1087), a Byzantine general of Armenian origin, usurped control of the region amidst the political turmoil caused by the Battle of Manzikert in 1071. Rumkale then came under Kogh Vasil, whose adoptive son and successor Vasil Dgha was tortured by Baldwin II of Edessa and forced to relinquish his lands, including Rumkale, to the Crusader states in 1116. Sometime between 1148 and 1150, Catholicos Grigor III Pahlavuni purchased the fortress making it the headquarters of the Armenian Apostolic Church, although it continued to house Syriac Orthodox and Catholic representatives. The town later became part of the Armenian Kingdom of Cilicia, and by 1268, became isolated from the rest of the Cilician domains.

In 1292, the castle was besieged and captured by the Mamluk Sultanate. From then on, it served as a significant outpost on the border with the Ilkhanate, a breakaway state of the Mongol Empire. In 1516, Rumkale surrendered to the Ottoman army without a siege following the Mamluk defeat at the Battle of Marj Dabiq.

In 1831, the fortress was depopulated after the Ottoman forces suppressed the rebellion led by the local tax collector. The next year, Egyptian general Ibrahim Pasha bombarded the fortress during the Egyptian–Ottoman War.

== Names ==
The site was historically known as Hromklay, Hromgla, or Klay-Horomakan in Armenian. It was also known as Urumgala by the locals, and the 15th-century traveler Johann Schiltberger recorded it as Urumkala. In Syriac sources, the site was attested to as Šūrō d'Rūmoyē, and by the 11th century, Qal'ah Rūmoytō and Ḥeṣnō d'Rūmoyē. Although the site was known as Rumkale and its variations throughout the entirety of its history from the medieval to late Ottoman period, it was renamed to Qal'at al-Muslimin following its capture by the Mamluk Sultanate in 1292.

== History ==
=== Antiquity ===
Rumkale's strategic location was known to the Assyrian Empire. Rumkale has been suggested to correspond to Shitamrat, which was taken by Shalmaneser III (r. 859 – 824 BC) in 855 BC, due to Rumkale's location on a cliff, which is an uncommon feature among other structures in the region. It is said that John, an apostle of Jesus, lived in Rumkale during Roman times. Although it is possible that the site was fortified by the Roman Empire, no remains of periods earlier than 1000 CE have been identified at the site.

=== Early medieval period ===
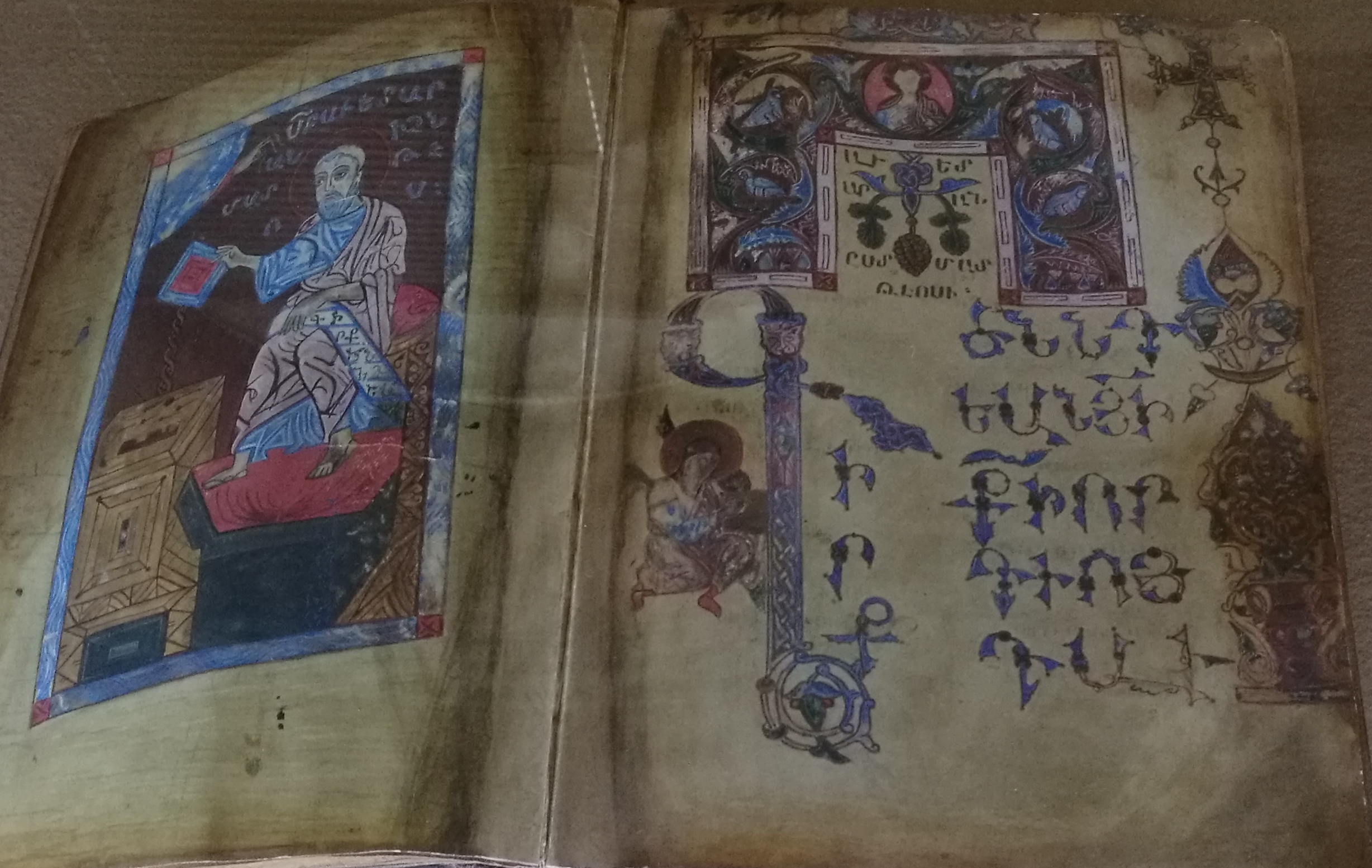
Manuscript produced in Rumkale in 1166, kept in Matenadaran.

From what remains of the fortress, the foundations may be traced back to the rule by the Byzantine Empire. The structure was potentially guarding the Byzantine frontier and the Roman road following the right bank of the Euphrates. The fortress housed a Syriac Orthodox bishopric during the 5–6th-centuries. Among its bishops were Uranius, who attended the Council of Antioch in 445, Maryiun, who took part in the consecration of Severus of Antioch and was later banished by Justin I (r. 518–27), and John, appointed by Jacob Baradaeus in mid-6th century. The site likely evolved into a settlement in the 11th century with the immigration of Armenians from the north as the Byzantine forces displaced a significant population from their lands.

By the 1080s, the region was under Philaretos Brachamios (r. 1071–1087), a Byzantine-Armenian general who carved up parts of the empire with the defeat at the Battle of Manzikert in 1071. Later, Hromgla became one of Kogh Vasil's domains, who was based in Kaysum to the north, and probably bore allegiance to Philaretos. Despite Kogh Vasil's wish to ally with the Crusader states, his adopted son and successor Vasil Dgha was captured, tortured, and forced to relinquish his lands to Baldwin II of Edessa in 1116. The fortress was likely part of the Lordship of Marash until the downfall of the County of Edessa between 1144 and 1151. The population of Edessa fled to neighboring places following its capture in 1144, including Rumkale. Between about 1147 and 1150, Rumkale served as the prison for Syriac Orthodox Metropolitan Basil bar Shumna, who, after having escaped from Edessa's second capture the previous year, was chained by Joscelin II, Count of Edessa.

With an Armenian bishop already present during that time, it was purchased by Gregory III from Beatrice of Turbessel in 1148 or 1150 to obtain a safe settlement for the Armenian Catholicosate. Gregory's brother Nerses IV was elected as Armenian Catholicos here in 1166 and it seems that at this time a very considerable settlement existed there during his time that also housed representatives of the Syriac Orthodox and the Catholic Church.

=== Armenian Cilician period ===
The castle became then part of the Armenian Kingdom of Cilicia. In the 1170 and 1172, theological conferences exploring a union of churches were held at Hromgla between the Armenian Church and the Byzantine Church with the Syrian Orthodox (Jacobite) Church sending observers. In 1179, a synod of 33 Armenian bishops took place in Hromgla came up with a compromise and sent a profession of faith to Byzantine Emperor Manuel I Komnenos, but he died in September 1180 before it reached him. From 1203 to 1293, it served as the residence of the Catholicos of the Armenian Church. The site became an important center for manuscript production, reaching its artistic peak under the Catholicos Constantine I who employed Toros Roslin, whose stylistic and iconographic innovations had profound influence on subsequent generations of Armenian art.

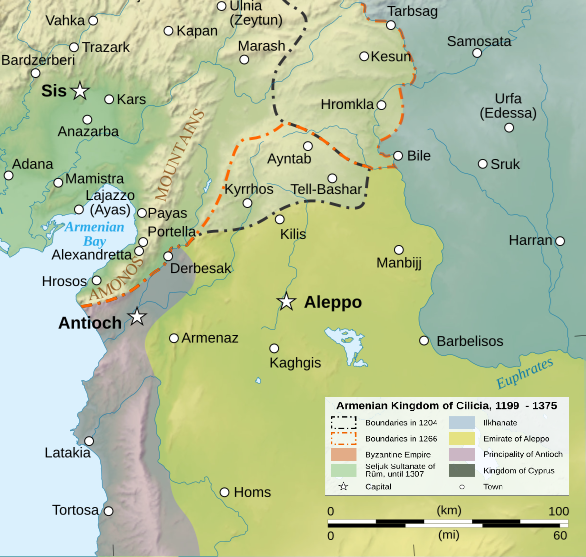
Hromkla within the Armenian Kingdom of Cilicia

By 1268, Hromgla was isolated from the remainder of the Armenian kingdom of Cilicia and was attacked by a force of Mamluks of Egypt, which destroyed the town while it was unable to conquer the citadel. On 19 May 1280, the fortress was besieged by the Mamluk army. Sultan Qalawun (r. 1279–90) demanded the catholicos to relocate to Jerusalem or Cilicia. However, the siege was unsuccessful.

=== Mamluk period ===
In 1292, the castle was captured following a protracted siege by the Mamluks under al-Ashraf and its garrison massacred while the clergy and other population were made prisoners or enslaved. Al-Ashraf also had the castle rebuilt and renamed it to Qal'at al-Muslimin. On several occasions, contemporary sources referred to the castle as a strategic base of the Mamluks for raids or intelligence in the lands of the Ilkhanate. It was not of the same importance as Bahasni to the north and Ayntab to the west. The castle was damaged by Timur's forces in 1400–1, but the structure was repaired again by the Mamluks.

Mamluk governors of Rumkale
Name	Year(s)
Kijli	1326
Anas	1348–1349/50
Sharaf al-Din Musa	1349–?
Taydamur al-Isma'ili	1350–?
Tuqtamur al-Kalatayi	?
Aqbay al-Ashrafi	1389
Kumushbugha al-Ashrafi	?–1392
Taghanji	1394–?
Tughan	?–1413
Damurdash al-Zahiri	1413
Janibak al-Hamzawi	1414–1415/16
Abu Bakr al-Babiri	?–1417
Mankli Khuja	1417–?
Ayaz al-Shamsi	?
Timraz al-Qirmishi	?–1423
Mughulbay al-Bajasi	?–1452
Nasir al-Din Muhammad	1452–?

In 1466, the Mamluk-controlled fortress fell to the Dulkadirid ruler Shah Suwar (r. 1466–72). However, much of Shah Suwar's new possessions were later regained by the Mamluks, and he was caught and executed in 1472.

In 1516, the Ottoman Empire and the Mamluk Sultanate engaged in a war that would facilitate the downfall of the latter. Although the Ottoman forces camped 25 km west of Rumkale near the Merziman Stream, they did not lay siege to the town and began advancing towards Ayntab. The garrison of the town handed over control to the Ottomans, who marched in the direction of Dabiq.

=== Ottoman period ===
Rumkale, along with other Mamluk fortresses and towns west of the Euphrates, surrendered to the Ottoman forces following the defeat of the Mamluk Sultanate at Battle of Marj Dabiq the same year. In 1517, Rumkale became the center of its namesake sanjak with Omer Beg-oghlu Idris as its sanjak-bey as part of the new Damascus-based Vilayet-i Arab (lit. 'Arab Province') of the Ottoman Empire. However, Rumkale was shortly demoted to the status of kaza of the Sanjak of Birejik sometime between 1518 and 1520.

All residents of Rumkale recorded in the Ottoman defters during the 16th-century were Muslim. The site was later repopulated by some Armenians, who were allowed to use the old catholical church on occasions.

Est. pop. of Rumkale in the 16th-century
	Neighborhoods				
Year	Qattan	Qizilja	Rumlulu	Hajji Halil	Total
1536	388	318	622	583	1911
1552	322	268	328	605	1523
1570	313	296	363	566	1538
1584	337	414	450	661	1862
Notes	Estimates are calculated by multiplying hane (household) by 5 and adding the number of mücerreds (single people).				

==== Desertion ====
Following the 1831 rebellion led by Bekirzade Mehmed Bey, the voivode (tax-collector, warlord) of Rumkale, the Ottoman government decreed the depopulation of the town and the destruction of the homes to prevent the fortress from harboring any future rebels.

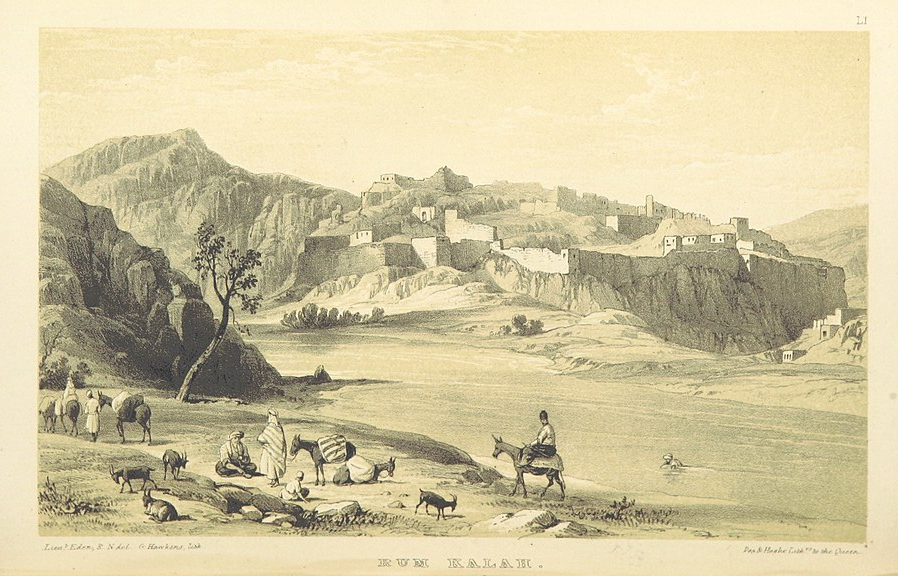
1835–37 drawing of Rumkale.

The remaining few intact buildings were bombarded by Ibrahim Pasha in 1832 during the Egyptian–Ottoman War, which forced the residents to relocate to the village of Kasaba, while influential families moved to the town of Halfeti on the opposite (eastern) side of the Euphrates or the city of Aintab in the west.

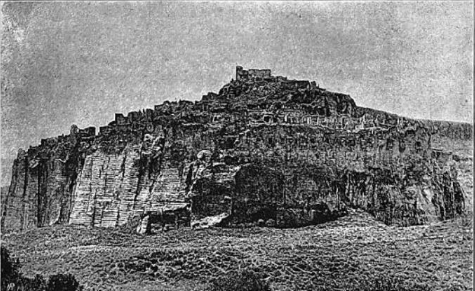
View of Rumkale from the north dated before 1890.

== Architecture ==
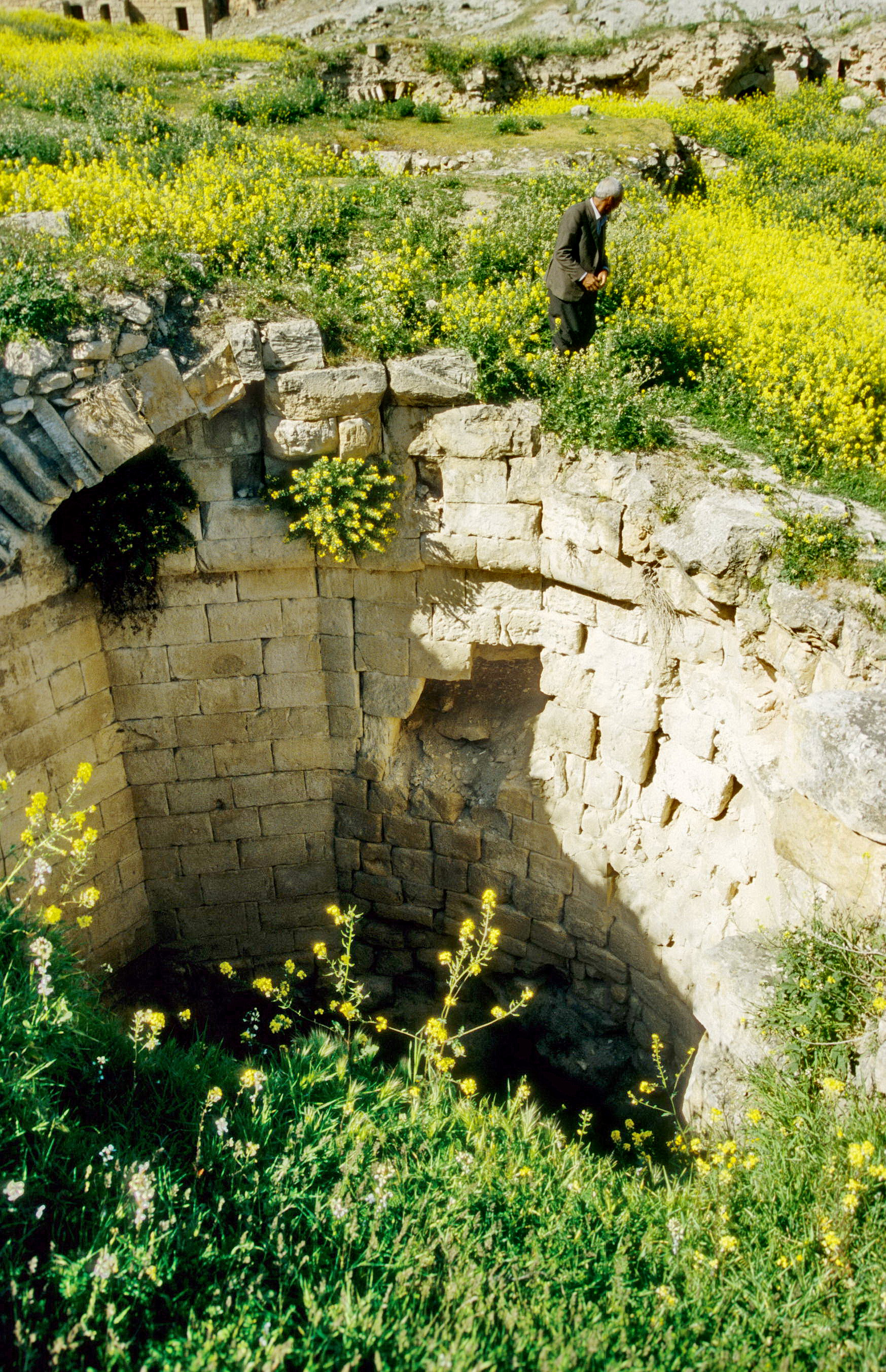
Well potentially near Rammahiya.

=== Churches ===
Thirteenth-century Syriac primate and writer Bar Hebraeus noted at least two Syriac Orthodox churches in Rumkale: a small church likely located in the town and built at the end of the 12th century and a larger one constructed in the lower neighborhood during Patriarch Ignatius III David's tenure (1222–52). Rumkale included a church erected by Rabban Isho, an Assyrian monk and copyist, who died in 1247 and was buried there.

=== Mosques ===
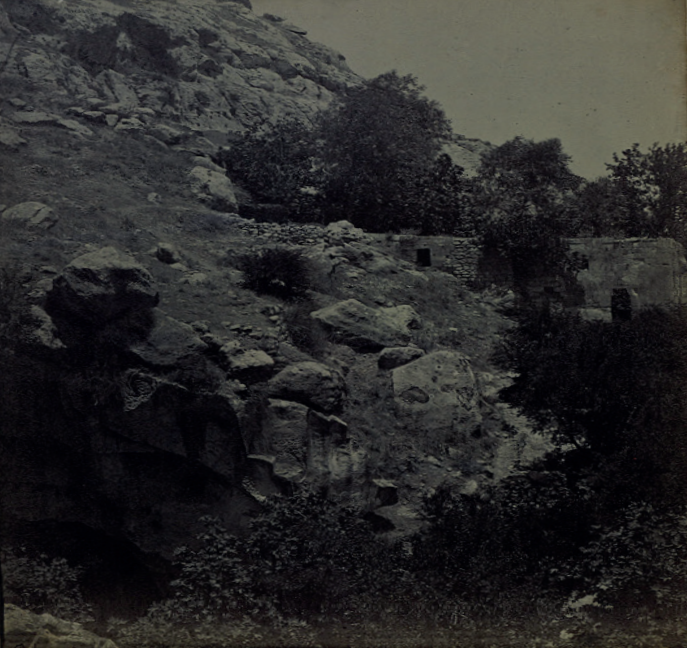
Photo of Hizir Ilyas Mosque during the reign of Abdul Hamid II (r. 1876–1909).

In the 16th-century Ottoman records detailing the population of Rumkale, historian H. Basri Karadeniz identified two mosques in the town, the Grand Mosque (Ulu Camii) and the Castle Mosque (Kal'a Camii). In addition to both two mosques, historian Ali Yılmaz listed 3 mosques Horos, Mehmed Saruji, and Zeytun, as well as 4 masjids, Kubbeli, Han, Hajji Osman, and Diremli. According to Yasin Taş, these mosques were potentially located in the neighboring villages, and the town contained only the first two mosques based on the same records, which attested to the presence of a smaller clergy community in Rumkale. In parallel, 17th-century traveler Evliya Çelebi mentioned one mosque and another in the suburbs in his seyahatnâme (travelogue).

Ak Masjid was likely built in late 17th century as it was first attested to in January 1697 and continued to be mentioned in Ottoman records through 1844. Abu'l-Qays Mosque first appeared in January 1726 with the appointment of a trustee and stopped being mentioned by mid-19th century. Ikiyollu Masjid was the only Islamic place of worship whose location is known to be in a specific neighborhood, Qizilja, from the Ottoman records. It was later known as Ghnana Masjid from its potential founder Abdulghani dubbed as Ghnana Dede. However, the masjid's construction year is unknown and it was first mentioned in February 1697. Oluk Mosque was recorded once in February 1697. Hizir Ilyas Mosque differs from the rest as it was not found in any archival records but is identified in a photo dated back to late 19th century.

=== Schools ===
The Rammahiya Madrasa was most likely located in the Rumlulu neighborhood. Historian Muhsin Soyudoğan points out that Zamahiya, the transliteration put forward by Yılmaz and Karadeniz in prior publications, is a result of the misreading of the shaddah, Arabic diacritic equivalent of double consonants, as a dot above the first letter, rāʾ, (ر) so that it was zāy (ز). The name of the institution was inevitably tied to the Ramah Spring. According to Soyudoğan, the name may be alluding to Syrian chemist Hasan al-Rammah, who died 3 years after Mamluk acquisition of Rumkale. In addition to a madrasa, the complex also included a primary school and a masjid. As opposed to the riverside, the complex was located inside the fortress, possibly near a famous well, since the institution's expenses listed in the Ottoman documents included ropes (rasan) and buckets (dalv) used for extracting water from wells.

== Access ==
The fortress, now situated across a peninsula created by the reservoir of Birecik Dam and within the administrative boundaries of Gaziantep's Nizip district, is currently accessible by boat either from the neighboring site of Zeugma or from the town of Halfeti. As of March 2017, it was not possible to land at the site; extensive (re)building is underway inside the fortress and on the external walls.

== Gallery ==
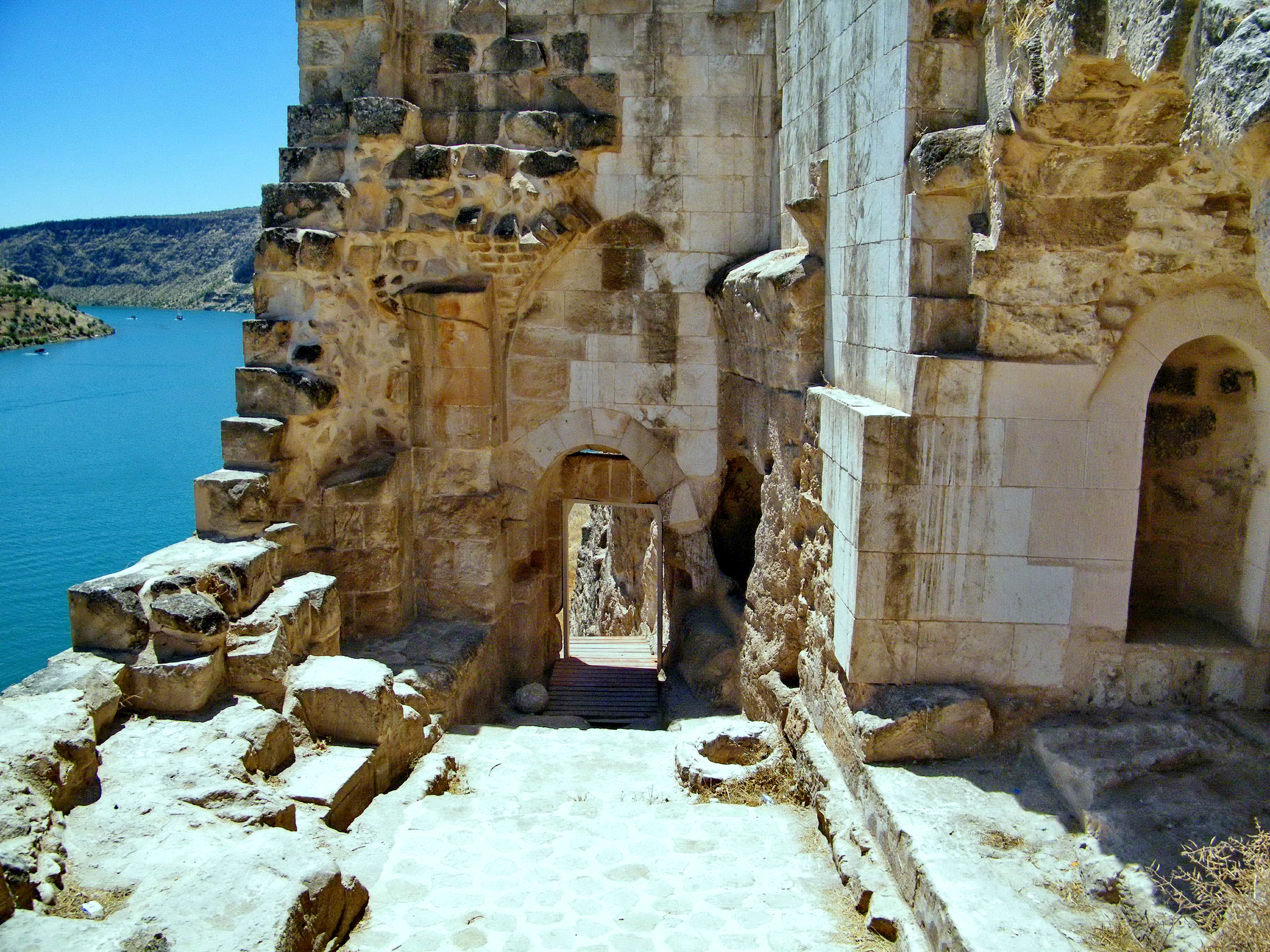
Eastern gate

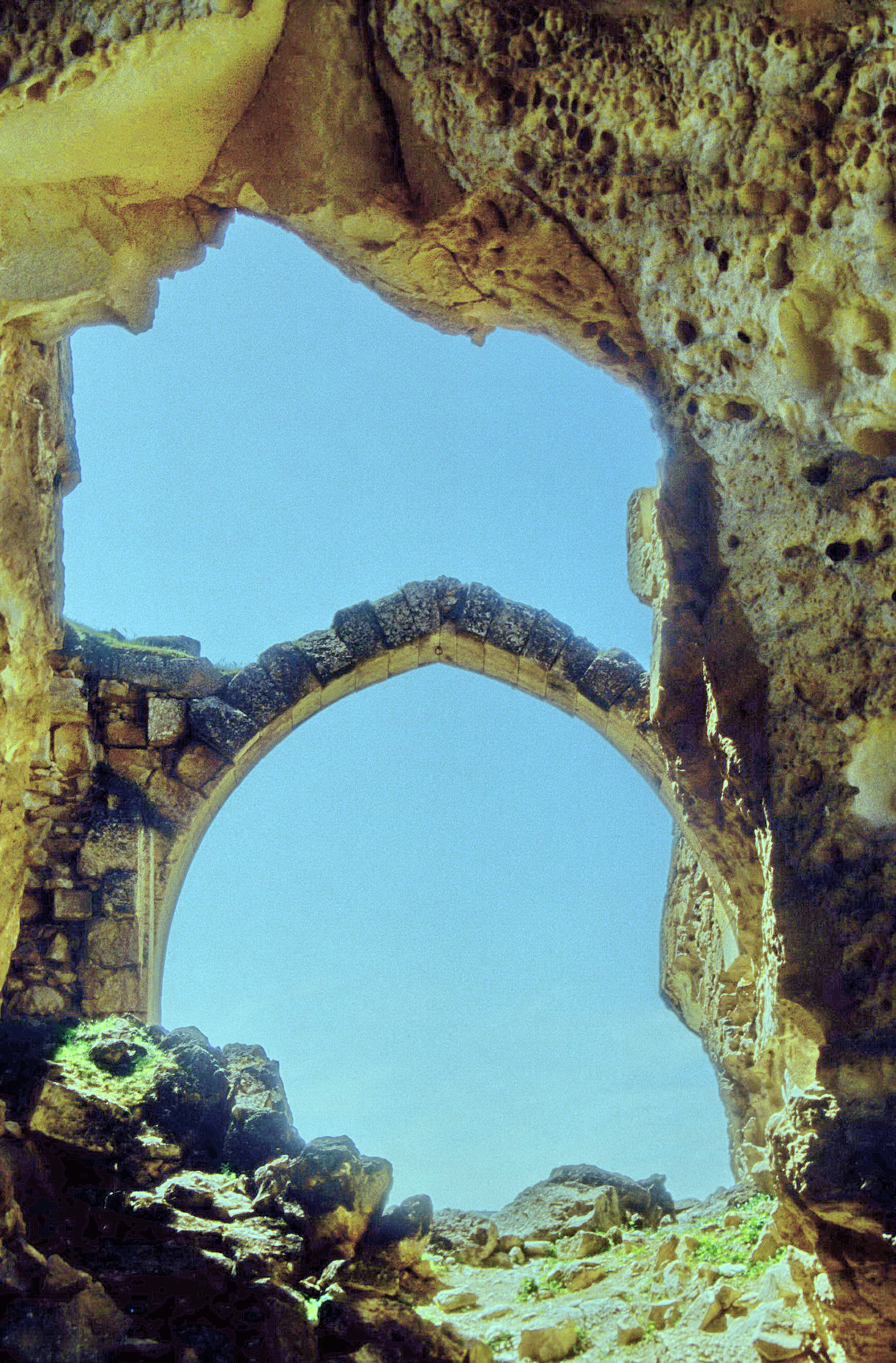
Western gate

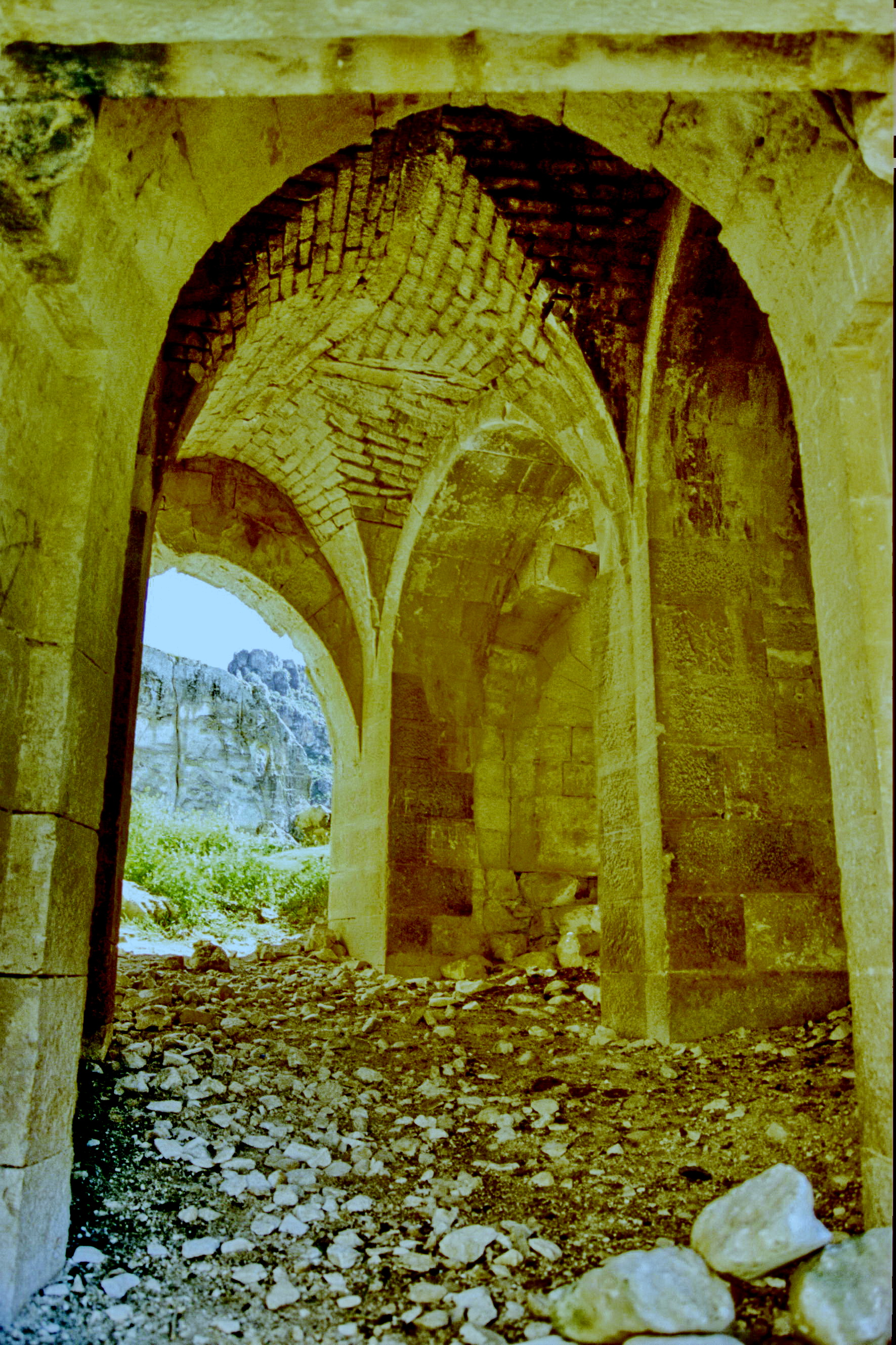
Inside the western gate

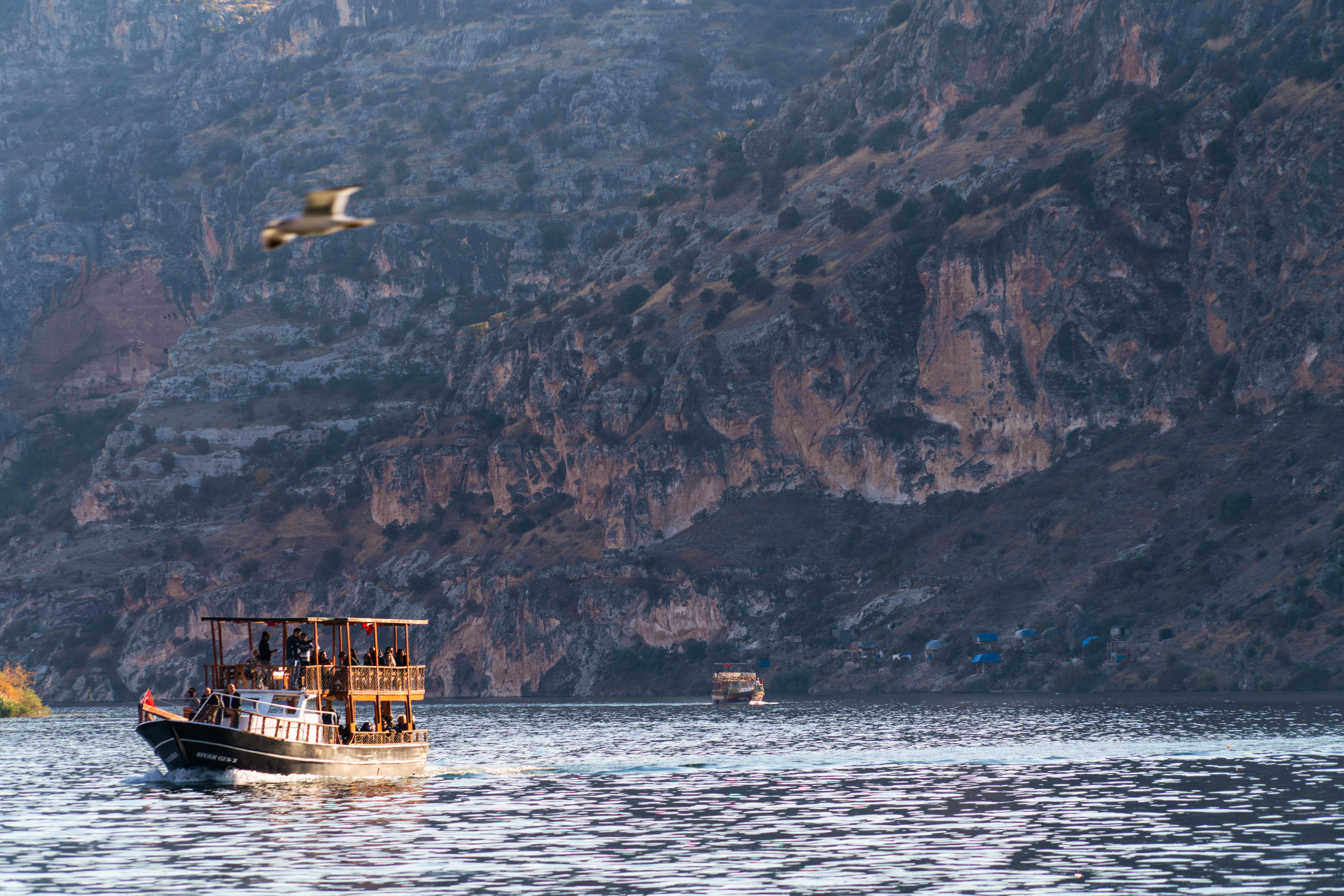
Boats around Rumkale

== See also ==
- List of Crusader castles

== Bibliography ==
- Bcheiry, Sharbel Iskandar (2022). "Rumkale in Syriac Sources During the Twelfth and Thirteenth Centuries". In Redford, Scott (ed.). Rumkale from the Medieval Period to the Present Day. Turkish Archeology and Cultural Heritage Institute. pp. 109–126. ISBN 978-625-7922-27-2.
- Comfort, Anthony; Abadie-Reynal, Catherine; Ergeç, Rifat (December 2000). "Crossing the Euphrates in Antiquity: Zeugma Seen From Space". Anatolian Studies. 50: 99–126. doi:10.2307/3643016. JSTOR 3643016.
- Dadoyan, Seta B. (1 November 2012). The Armenians in the Medieval Islamic World: Armenian Realpolitik in the Islamic World and Diverging Paradigmscase of Cilicia Eleventh to Fourteenth C. Transaction Publishers. ISBN 978-1-4128-4782-7.
- Evans, Helen C. (2008). "Hromkla". In Evans, Helen C. (ed.). Armenia: Art, Religion, and Trade in the Middle Ages. Metropolitan Museum of Art. ISBN 9781588396600.
- Hamilton, B. (1999). "Aimery of Limoges and the Unity of Churches". In Ciggaar, Krijna Nelly; Teule, Herman G. B. (eds.). East and West in the Crusader States: Context, Contacts, Confrontations II : Acta of the Congress Held at Hernen Castle in May 1997. Peeters Publishers. pp. 1–12. ISBN 978-90-429-0786-7.
- Honigmann, Ernst & Bosworth, Clifford Edmund (1995). "Rūm Ḳalʿesi". In Bosworth, C. E.; van Donzel, E.; Heinrichs, W. P. & Lecomte, G. (eds.). The Encyclopaedia of Islam, Second Edition. Volume VIII: Ned–Sam. Leiden: E. J. Brill. ISBN 978-90-04-09834-3.
- Karadeniz, H. Basri (August 1998). "XVI. Yüzyılda Rumkale". Belleten. 62 (234): 425–456. doi:10.37879/belleten.1998.425. ISSN 2791-6472.
- Kuş Şahin, Candan; Kasar, Yasemin (2016). "An Evaluation of Ecotourism Potentials of Rumkale Archaeological Region". British Journal of Applied Science & Technology. 16 (1): 1–12. ISSN 2231-0843.
- Maranci, Christina (2022). "The Architecture of Rumkale/Hromkla: Description and Remarks". In Redford, Scott (ed.). Rumkale from the Medieval Period to the Present Day. Turkish Archeology and Cultural Heritage Institute. pp. 19–81. ISBN 978-625-7922-27-2.
- Mércz, András (2021). "Andreas Masius' Copy of the Anaphora of Saint Basil in Light of his Correspondence with Moses of Mardin". In Ishac, Ephrem A.; Zammit Lupi, Theresa; Csanády, Thomas (eds.). Tracing Written Heritage in a Digital Age. Harrassowitz Verlag. pp. 311–330. ISBN 9783447116015. OCLC 1249271801.
- Russel, James R. (2005). "The Credal Poem Hawatov Xostovanim ("I Confess in Faith") of St. Nerses the Graceful". In Ginkel, Jan J.; Murre-van den Berg, Hendrika Lena; van Lint, Theo Maarten (eds.). Redefining Christian Identity: Cultural Interaction in the Middle East Since the Rise of Islam. Peeters Publishers. pp. 185–236. ISBN 978-90-429-1418-6.
- Stewart, Angus (2006). "Hromgla", in Alan V. Murray (ed.). The Crusades: An Encyclopaedia. Vol. II. p. 607. ABC-CLIO. ISBN 1-57607-862-0.
- Stewart, Angus Donal (1 January 2001). The Armenian Kingdom and the Mamluks: War and Diplomacy During the Reigns of Hetʻum II (1289-1307). BRILL. ISBN 978-90-04-12292-5.
- Stewart, Angus (2006). "Qal'at al Rum/Hromgla/Rumkale and the Mamluk Siege of 691 AH/1292 CE". In Kennedy, Hugh N. (ed.). Muslim Military Architecture in Greater Syria: From the Coming of Islam to the Ottoman Period. Brill. ISBN 978-90-04-14713-3.
- Stewart, Angus (2022). "'One of the Most Glorious Fortresses': Rum Kale in the Sultanate of Cairo". In Redford, Scott (ed.). Rumkale from the Medieval Period to the Present Day. Turkish Archeology and Cultural Heritage Institute. pp. 127–148. ISBN 9786257922272.
- Reuven Amitai-Preiss (1995). Mongols and Mamluks: The Mamluk-Īlkhānid War, 1260-1281. Cambridge University Press. pp. 179–225. ISBN 0-521-46226-6.
- Soyudoğan, Muhsin (2022). "Fetihten Yıkıma: Osmanlı Rumkale'si" [From Conquest to Destruction: Ottoman Rumkale]. In Redford, Scott (ed.). Rumkale from the Medieval Period to the Present Day (in Turkish). Turkish Archeology and Cultural Heritage Institute. pp. 151–180. ISBN 978-625-7922-27-2.
- Taş, Yasin (June 2024). "Bir Harabe Şehrin Kaybolan Mabetleri: Eski Rumkale Merkezinde Cami ve Mescitler". Journal of Waqfs (in Turkish). 61: 133–150. ISSN 2564-6796.
- van Lint, Theo M. (1999). "Lament on Edessa by Nerses Snorhali". In Ciggaar, Krijna Nelly; Teule, Herman G. B. (eds.). East and West in the Crusader States: Context, Contacts, Confrontations II: Acta of the Congress Held at Hernen Castle in May 1997. Peeters Publishers. pp. 29–48. ISBN 978-90-429-0786-7.
- Yinanç, Refet (1989). Dulkadir Beyliği (in Turkish). Ankara: Turkish Historical Society Press. ISBN 9751601711. OCLC 21676736.
