= Izz al-Din al-Kawrani =

Egyptian politician and military leader

Emir Izz al-Din al-Kawrani
- عز الدين الكوراني
- Born: Egypt
- Relatives: Hussein bin al-Kawrani (brother); Alaa al-Din bin Ali bin Mamdoud al-Kawrani (Wali of Gharbia); Husam al-Din Hussein bin Ali bin Mamdoud al-Kawrani (Wali of Menoufia); Omar bin Mamdoud al-Kawrani
- Military career
- Allegiance: Mamluk Sultanate
- Branch: Mamluk army
- Rank: Wali (governor) of Qus
- Conflicts: Fourth battle of Dongola (1287)

Izz al-Din al-Kawrani (Arabic: عز الدين الكَوْراني) was an Egyptian politician and military leader, and one of the leaders of the campaign to invade Makuria (Nubia) in 1287 by order of Sultan Qalawun of Egypt. His campaign achieved a landslide victory, and this victory is one of the reasons for the end of the rule of the Christian Nubian kingdoms in Sudan.

== Lineage ==
He comes from the al-Kawrani family, which is an Egyptian family that follows the Shafi'i school. Al-Kawrani means “Kawar | كور,” and “Kawar” is a geographical term that refers to the people of villages in Egypt, and some suggest that Izz al-Din is originally from the villages of Upper Egypt.

A number of political and military figures appeared from this family during the reign of the Qalawunid dynasty, the most prominent of whom was Alaa al-Din Ali bin al-Kawrani, who was the governor (wali) of Gharbia, then became the governor of Cairo in the year 764 AH, and his son Husam al-Din Hassan bin Alaa al-Din Ali bin Mamdoud al-Kawrani, who became the governor of Menoufia in the year 765 AH. In the year 768 AH, he became governor of Cairo, put down the rebellions in the Levant, and attained the highest military rank in the Egyptian Mamluk Sultanate, which was Muqadam Alaf.

== Conquest of Makuria ==
On the 6th of Dhu al-Hijja of the year 686 AH, emir Alam al-Din Sanjar al-Masrouri, known as al-Khayyat, governor of Cairo, emir Izz al-Din al-Kawrani, and emir Izz al-Din Aidmar headed to invade Nubia. Sultan Qalawun sent with them a group of soldiers from the provinces of Upper Egypt and al-Qaragholamiya, and wrote to emir Izz al-Din Aidmar al-Sayfi al-Selahdar, the governor of Qus, to march with them with his equipment and those of the Royal Mamluks with him who are centered in the al-a'mal al-Qusyia and the soldiers of the markaz Qus (Qus center).

Al-Khayyat marched on the western coast with half of the army, and Aidmar marched on the second half of the eastern shore, which is the side in which the city of Dongola (the capital of the Kingdom of Makuria) is located. When the army reached the outskirts of Nubia, the king of Makuria, Samamoun, evacuated the country. He was clever and cunning, and he was powerful.

Samamoun sent a letter to his deputy, whose name was Jiris, and the owner of this state was known in Makuria as the owner of the mountain (Sahib al-Jabal), ordering him to evacuate the lands under his hand in front of the advancing army, and they (Makurians) kept leaving, with the Egyptian soldiers behind them, until they reached the king of Makuria at Dongola, and Samamoun came out and fought emir Izz al-Din Aidmar fiercely, and the king of Makuria was defeated and many of those with him were killed, and several Muslims were martyred.

The Egyptian army followed the king of Makuria on a fifteen-day march from Dongola until they overtook Jiris and captured him. They also captured the king’s cousin, who was one of their greats, so emir Izz al-Din appointed the king’s sister’s son to the kingdom of Makuria and appointed Jiris as his deputy. He sent soldiers with them and assigned them a piece of land that they would carry every year, and he returned with spoils, including many slaves, horses, camels, cows, and livestock.
