= Baydara =

Badr al-Din Baydara al-Mansuri (Arabic: بدر الدين بيدارة المنصوري) was the na'ib al-saltana (viceroy) of the Mamluk sultan al-Ashraf Khalil (r. 1290–1293)

== Early life ==
Baydara was a toddler when he arrived in Cairo with his mother as captives from the Battle of Ain Jalut in 1260.

== Career ==
Baydara was appointed the governor of Upper Egypt, excluding the Fayyum oasis, in 1281 by the Mamluk Sultan Qalawun (r. 1271–1290).

== Bibliography ==
- Mazor, Amir (2015). The Rise and Fall of a Muslim Regiment: The Manṣūriyya in the First Mamluk Sultanate, 678/1279–741/1341. Gottingen: Bonn University Press. ISBN 978-3-8471-0424-7.
- Sato, Tsugitaka (1997). State and Rural Society in Medieval Islam: Sultans, Muqtaʻs, and Fallahun. Leiden, New York and Koln: Brill. ISBN 90-04-10649-9.
