= Hasan al-Rammah =

Syrian chemist and engineer (died 1295)

Hasan al-Rammah (Arabic: حسن الرماح, died 1295) was a Syrian Arab chemist and engineer during the Mamluk Sultanate who studied gunpowders and explosives, and sketched prototype instruments of warfare, including a rocket-propelled surface weapon designed for water. Al-Rammah described this design as "an egg which moves itself and burns." It was made of two sheet-pans of metal fastened together and filled with naphtha, metal filings, and potassium nitrate. It was intended to move across the surface of the water, propelled by a large rocket and kept on course by a small rudder. Despite being frequently cited as the first "torpedo," historians of technology classify the device as a rocket-propelled surface weapon rather than a modern underwater missile, as it was designed to skim across the surface of the water and lacks historical evidence of actual deployment in combat.

Al-Rammah devised several new types of gunpowder, a new type of fuse, and two types of lighters.
