= Qalawun =

Mamluk Sultan of Egypt and Syria (r. 1279–1290)

al-Manṣūr Qalāwūn
- al-Malik al-Manṣūr kassim amir al-mu'minin
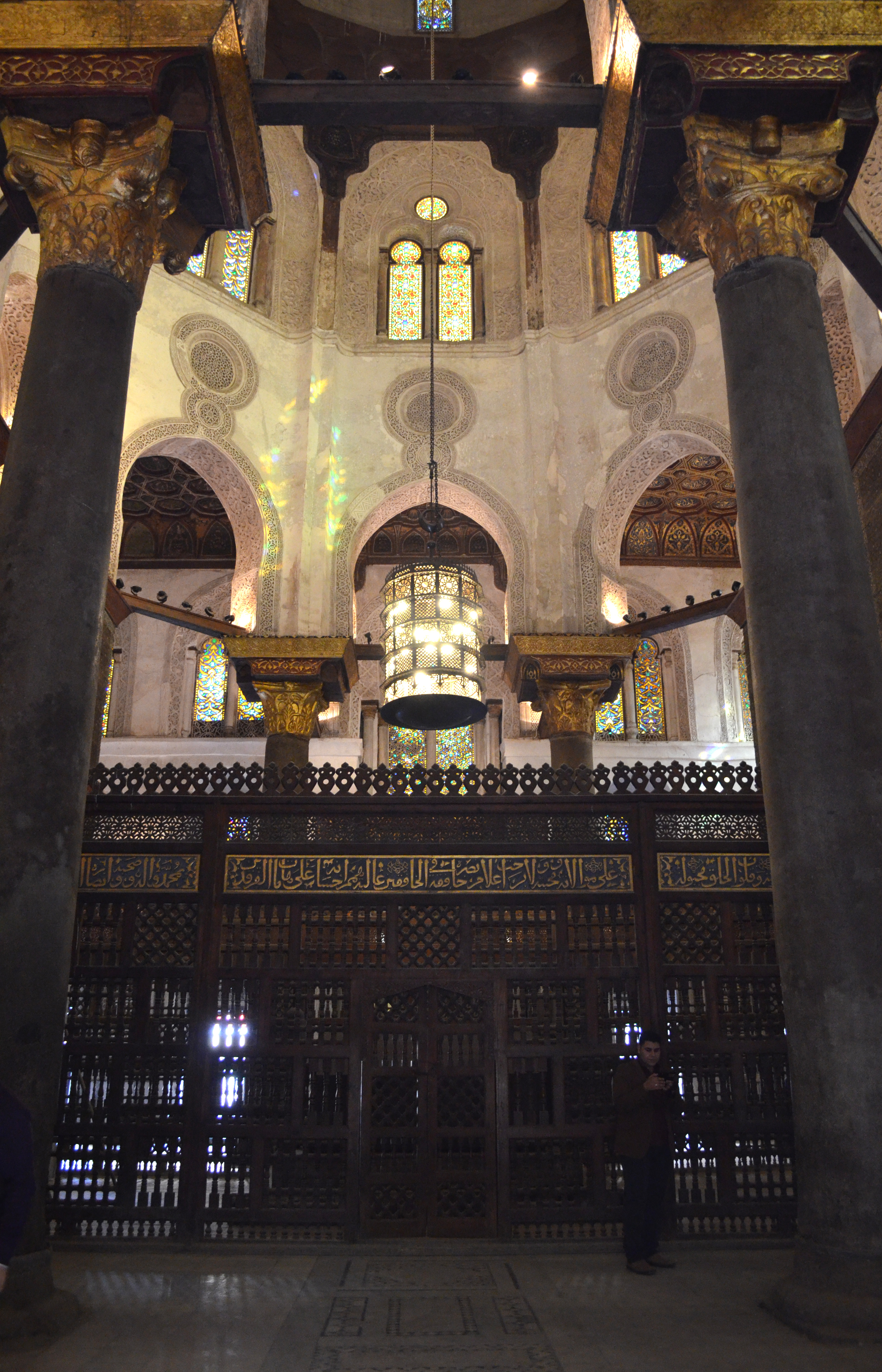
- For a time, Mamluk sultans after him received their coronation here.

Sultan of Egypt
- Reign: November 1279 – 10 November 1290
- Predecessor: Solamish
- Successor: al-Ashraf Khalil
- Born: c. 1222
- Died: November 10, 1290 (aged 67–68); Cairo, Egypt
- Burial: Qalawun complex
- Consort: Fatima Khatun; Qutqutiya Khatun; Sitt Ashlun Khatun
- Issue: As-Salih Ali; Al-Ashraf Khalil; An-Nasir Muhammad; Amir Ahmad; Ghaziya Khatun; Dar Mukhtar al-Jawhari; Dar Anbar al-Kamili
- Royal name: الملك الْمَنْصُور سيف الدّين قَلَاوُونَ بن عبد الله الألفي العلائي الصَّالِحِي
- House: Qalawunid dynasty
- Dynasty: Bahri Mamluks
- Religion: Sunni Islam

Qalāwūn aṣ-Ṣāliḥī (Arabic: قلاوون الصالحي, c. 1222 – November 10, 1290) was the seventh Turkic Bahri Mamluk sultan of Egypt; he ruled from 1279 to 1290. He was called al-Manṣūr Qalāwūn (المنصور قلاوون, "Qalāwūn the Victorious"). After having risen in power in the Mamluk court and elite circles, Qalawun eventually held the title of "the victorious king" and gained de facto authority over the sultanate. He is the founder of the Qalawunid dynasty that ruled Egypt for over a century.

The current sultan, Barakah was exiled and rumored to have been poisoned by Qalawun. He would then wage war against the Crusaders, capturing lands held by the County of Tripoli, and later totally defeating them in 1289. Acre, a major Crusader stronghold was besieged by Qalawun but would only be taken by his son al-Ashraf Khalil as the former died before the siege was won in 1291. His son Khalil succeeded him as sultan.

== Biography and rise to power ==
Qalawun was a Kipchak (a Turkic people living between the Black Sea and Caspian Sea) from the Burj Oghli (Arabic: برج اغلي) tribe, the same tribe as the earlier Mamluk sultan Baybars. They were both probably sold into slavery during the Mongol invasions of Kipchak territories in the 1220s and 1230s. When he was 14 years old, Qalawun was brought by slave merchants to Egypt, which was under Ayyubid rule at the time. He was then purchased as a mamluk (slave soldier) sometime in the 1230s or 1240s, by a mamluk amir (commander) whom different historical sources name as either 'Ala al-Din Aqsunqur al-Kamili (a mamluk of Sultan al-Kamil) or 'Ala al-Din Aqsunqur al-Saqi al-'Adili (a mamluk of Sultan al-Adil). He was bought for the unusually high price of a thousand dinars, which earned him the nickname al-Alfī ("the Thousander").

Qalawun initially spoke little Arabic, but he rose in power and influence, becoming an emir under Sultan Baibars, (Note: Upon the death of Faris ad-Din Aktai in 1254, Bahri Mamluks (including Baibars and Qalawun) fled to an-Nasir Yusuf in Syria, then returned to Egypt during the reign of Qutuz.) whose son, al-Said Barakah, was married to Qalawun's daughter. Baibars died in 1277 and was succeeded by Barakah. In early 1279, as Barakah and Qalawun invaded the Armenian Kingdom of Cilicia, a revolt in Egypt forced Barakah to abdicate upon his return home. He was succeeded by his brother Solamish, but it was Qalawun, acting as atabeg, who was the true holder of power. Because Solamish was only seven years old, Qalawun argued that Egypt needed an adult ruler, and Solamish was sent into exile in Constantinople in late 1279. As a result, Qalawun took the title al-Malik al-Manṣūr ("the victorious king").

The governor of Damascus, Sunqur al-Ashqar, opposed Qalawun's ascent to power and declared himself sultan. Sunqur's claim of leadership, however, was repelled in 1280, when Qalawun defeated him in battle. In 1281, Qalawun and Sunqur reconciled as a matter of convenience when Abaqa Khan, head of the Ilkhanate, invaded Syria. Qalawun and Sunqur, working together, successfully repelled Abaqa's attack at the Second Battle of Homs.

Barakah, Solamish, and their brother Khadir were exiled to al-Karak, the former Crusader castle. Barakah died there in 1280 (it was rumored that Qalawun had him poisoned), and Khadir gained control of the castle, until 1286 when Qalawun took it over directly.

In 1282 he founded Ribat al-Mansuri, a ribat (hospice) next to the Ḥaram ash-Sharīf in Jerusalem. The nearby Ribāṭ Kurt al-Manṣūrī was founded by Kurd al-Manṣūrī, a mamluk of Qalawun.

== Mamluk diplomacy ==
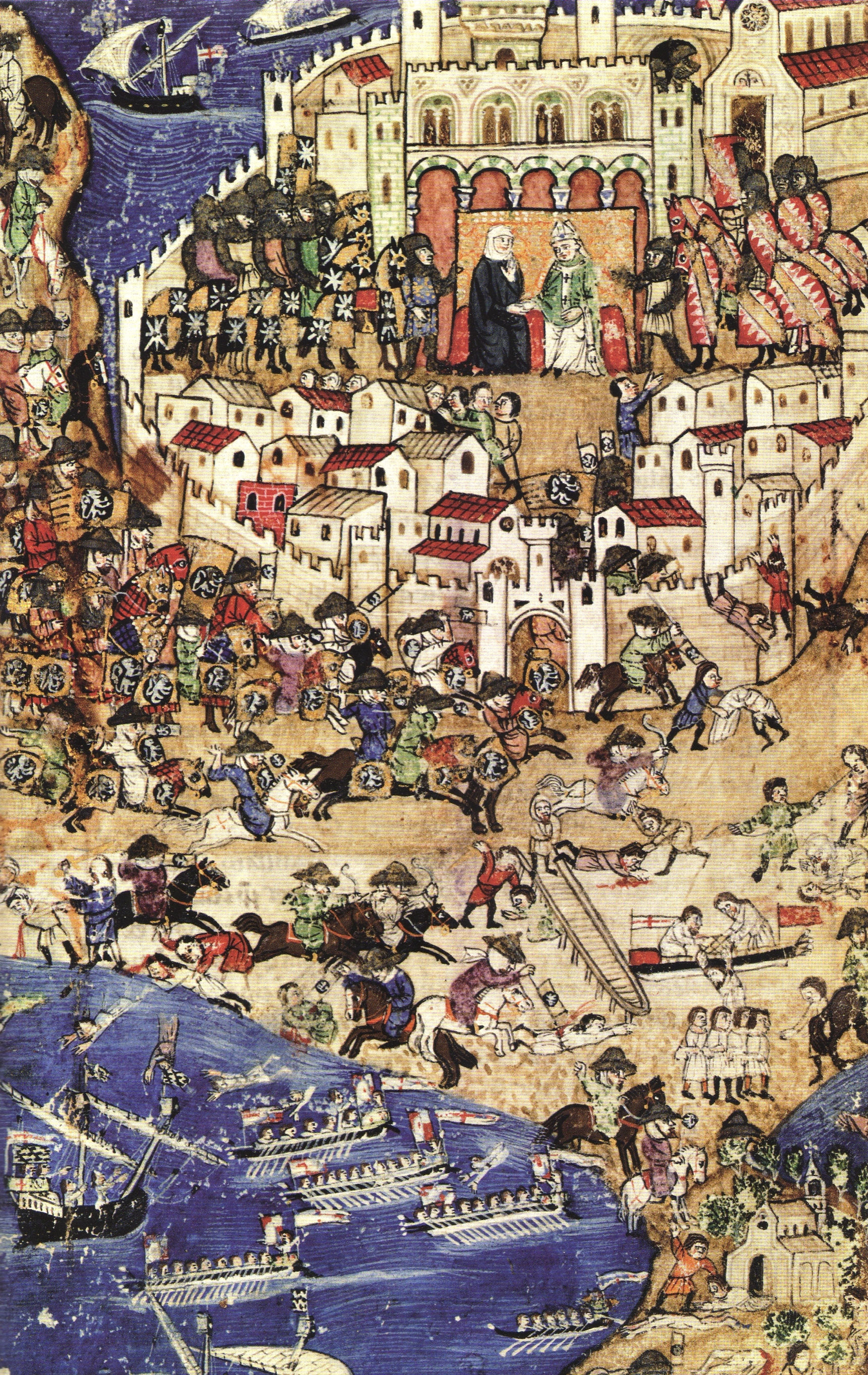
The siege of Tripoli by the Mamluks of Qalawun in 1289.

As Baibars had done previously, Qalawun entered into land control treaties with the remaining Crusader states, military orders and individual lords who wished to remain independent; he recognized Tyre and Beirut as separate from the Kingdom of Jerusalem, now centered on Acre. The treaties were always in Qalawun's favor, and his treaty with Tyre mandated that the city would not build new fortifications, would stay neutral in conflicts between the Mamluks and other Crusaders, and Qalawun would be allowed to collect half the city's taxes.

In 1281 Qalawun also negotiated an alliance with Michael VIII Palaiologos of the Byzantine Empire to bolster resistance against Charles I of Naples, who was threatening both the Byzantine Empire and the Kingdom of Jerusalem. In 1290, he concluded trade alliances with the Republic of Genoa and the Kingdom of Sicily.

== Wars against the Crusader states ==
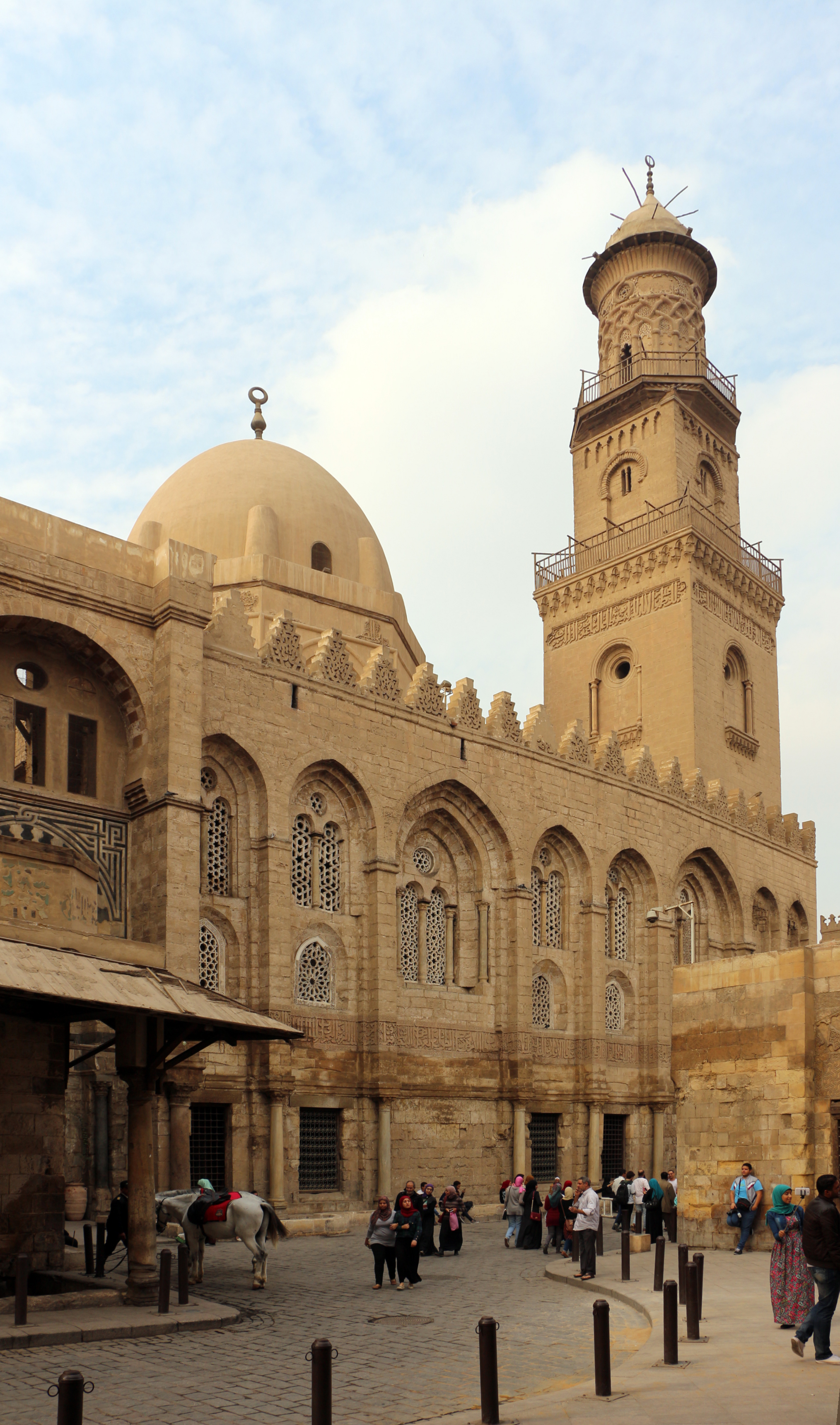
The Qalawun complex (mausoleum-madrasa-maristan) on Muizz Street, Bayn al-Qasrayn, Egypt.

Undeterred by the terms of these newly formed peace treaties, Qalawun sacked the "impregnable" Hospitaller fortress of Margat in 1285, and established a Mamluk garrison there. He also captured and destroyed the castle of Maraclea. He captured Latakia in 1287 and Tripoli on April 27, 1289, thus ending the Crusader County of Tripoli. The Fall of Tripoli in 1289 was spurred by the Venetians and the Pisans, who opposed rising Genoese influence in the area. In 1290, reinforcements of King Henry arrived in Acre and drunkenly slaughtered peaceable merchants and peasants, Christians and Muslims alike.

Qalawun sent an emissary to ask for an explanation and above all to demand that the murderers be handed over for punishment. The Frankish response was divided between those who sought to appease him and those who sought a new war. Having received neither an explanation nor the murderers themselves, Qalawun decided that the ten-year truce he had formed with Acre in 1284 had been broken by the Franks. He subsequently besieged the city that same year. He died in Cairo on 10 November 1290, before taking the city, but Acre was captured the next year by his son and successor al-Ashraf Khalil.

Despite Qalawun's distrust of his son, Khalil succeeded him following his death. Khalil continued his father's policy of replacing TurkicMamluks with Circassians, which eventually led to conflict within the Mamluk ranks. Khalil was assassinated by the Turks in 1293, but Qalawun's legacy continued when his younger son, an-Nasir Muhammad, claimed power.

== Family ==
Qalawun's first wife was Fatima Khatun, known as Umm Salih. She was the daughter of Sayf ad-Din Karmun (Karamūm), a Mongol commander from the Golden Horde who had integrated the Mamluks. They married in 1265–66. She was the mother of his eldest son, as-Salih Ali (died 2 September 1288) and Ghaziya Khatun. She died in 1283–84, and was buried in her own mausoleum in Southern Cemetery, Cairo.

After her death, he married her sister, the widow of Sayf ad-Din Kunduk. Another wife was Qutqutiya Khatun. She was the mother of his second son, Sultan al-Ashraf Khalil.

Another wife was Sitt Ashlun Khatun (Ašlūn), the daughter of an Ilkhanate Mongol notable named Suktay bin Qarajin bin Jighan Nuwan (Šaktāy) who also had joined the Mamluks. They married in 1282. She was the mother of his third son, Sultan an-Nasir Muhammad. An-Nasir Muhammad was raised and behaved in Mongol fashion until the age of 29, until he had a change of mood after an illness in 1315, which led him and his followers to "shave their heads [...] and give up their flowing locks".

Another wife was the daughter of Amir Shams ad-Din Sunqur al-Takriti al-Zahiri. They married in 1288–89. Qalawun, however, dissolved the marriage shortly thereafter. Another son was Amir Ahmad, who died during the reign of his brother al-Ashraf Khalil. Qalawun's daughter Ghaziya Khatun was betrothed to as-Said Barakah (son of Sultan Baibars) on 28 May 1276, with a dowry of five thousand dinars. The wedding took place on 8 June 1277. She died in August 1288, and was buried in the mausoleum of her mother. Another daughter was Dar Mukhatar al-Jawhari (Altumish). She was the wife of Mukhtar al-Jawhari. Another daughter was Dar Anbar al-Kamili. She was the wife of Anbar al-Kamili.

== See also ==
- Qalawun complex

== Bibliography ==
- Burgoyne, Michael Hamilton (1987). Mamluk Jerusalem. British School of Archaeology in Jerusalem by the World of Islam Festival Trust. ISBN 090503533X.
- The Travels of Ibn Battuta translated by H.A.R. Gibb
- Humphreys, R. Stephen (1977), From Saladin to the Mongols: The Ayyubids of Damascus, 1193–1260, Albany, New York: State University of New York Press, ISBN 0-87395-263-4
- Northrup, Linda (1998). From Slave to Sultan: The Career of Al-Manṣūr Qalāwūn and the Consolidation of Mamluk Rule in Egypt and Syria (678-689 A.H./1279-1290 A.D.). Stuttgart. ISBN 3-515-06861-9.

Qalawun Bahri Mamluks Cadet branch of the Mamluk Sultanate Born: c. 1222 Died: 10 November 1290
Regnal titles
Preceded by Solamish	Sultan of Egypt and Syria; November 1279 – 10 November 1290	Succeeded by al-Ashraf Khalil
