= Hugh II of Cyprus =

King of Cyprus from 1253 to 1267

Hugh II
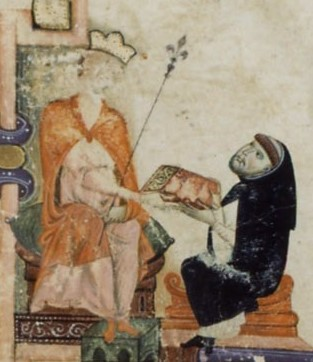
- Thomas Aquinas presents his book, De regno, ad regem Cypri, to King Hugh

King of Cyprus
- Reign: 1253–1267
- Predecessor: Henry I
- Successor: Hugh III
- Regents: Plaisance of Antioch (1253–1261); Hugh of Antioch (1261–1267)
- Born: c. December 1252
- Died: November or 5 December 1267
- Spouse: Isabella, Lady of Beirut (possibly only betrothed)
- House: House of Lusignan
- Father: Henry I of Cyprus
- Mother: Plaisance of Antioch

Hugh II (French: Hugues; c. December 1252 – November or 5 December 1267) was the king of Cyprus and lord of the Kingdom of Jerusalem. When his father, King Henry I, died shortly after his birth, the infant became king under the regency of his mother, Plaisance of Antioch. In 1258, he was recognized as the heir presumptive and regent of King Conrad III of Jerusalem. After Queen Plaisance died in 1261, Hugh's cousin Hugh of Antioch became the new regent. The king died shortly before he was to reach the age of majority, which spelled the end of the first Lusignan dynasty in Cyprus. He was succeeded by Hugh of Antioch.

== Birth ==
Hugh was the only child of Henry I, king of Cyprus and lord of the Kingdom of Jerusalem, and his third wife, Plaisance of Antioch. He was born after November or December 1252; King Henry died on 18 January 1253 or 1254, and there is no evidence suggesting that Hugh was born posthumously. Henry had been obese and had apparently been expected to die childless. Hugh's birth—or impending birth—appears to have prompted John of Ibelin to scramble to have the pope recognize his title to the County of Jaffa, given to him by Henry; he may have feared that Hugh would one day challenge the legality of the grant.

== Reign ==
=== Regencies ===
With King Henry's death, his son became king of Cyprus, and the High Court of Cyprus recognized the late king's widow, Plaisance, as their son's guardian and regent. In the Kingdom of Jerusalem, a legal principle established in 1243 held that the regency on behalf of the absent king–then Conrad II, who lived in Europe–should belong to his nearest relative in the Latin East who laid a claim to it; on this basis, it had been conferred on Hugh's grandmother, Queen Alice, and father, King Henry. This principle became difficult to implement after Henry's death because Hugh, Conrad's new heir, was a minor and so could not exercise the regency. John of Arsuf became the de facto ruler of Jerusalem, holding the office of bailli. Conrad II died in 1254 and was succeeded by his infant son Conrad III. In 1256, Queen Plaisance sent envoys to King Henry III of England proposing that she marry Henry's son Edmund and that Hugh marry Henry's daughter Beatrice. Neither union materialized, probably because Henry attempted to obtain the Sicilian throne for his son.

In the Kingdom of Jerusalem, a war raged between the Knights Templar, the Venetians, and the Pisans on one side and the Knights Hospitaller, the Genoese, and the Catalans on the other. Queen Plaisance's brother, Bohemond VI, prince of Antioch and count of Tripoli, decided to intervene. On 1 February 1258, he brought his sister and nephew to the kingdom's capital, Acre. At a general assembly of the barons, the military orders, the communes, and the burghers, Bohemond argued for the recognition of Hugh as the heir presumptive to Conrad and lord of the kingdom and of Plaisance as his bailli. The masters of the Templars and the Teutonic Order, the barons, and the representatives of the Venetian and Pisan communes swore fealty to Hugh, but the Hospitallers, the Genoese, and the Catalans refused. Having failed to achieve peace, Bohemond took Plaisance and Hugh to Tripoli, from where they returned to Cyprus.

Queen Plaisance died in September 1261. The right to the regency then belonged to Hugh's closest relative and heir presumptive—his aunt Isabella. She allowed her son, Hugh of Antioch, to become the new regent of Cyprus, while she claimed the bailliage of Jerusalem. Jerusalemite law required the prospective bailli to appear at the High Court of Jerusalem with their ward, but Isabella failed to bring Hugh II and her powers were thus restricted. After Isabella's death in 1264, Hugh II's cousins Hugh of Antioch and Hugh of Brienne both claimed the bailliage. Hugh of Brienne had a strong claim because his mother, Maria, was the elder of King Henry's sisters, but the High Court recognized Hugh of Antioch because he was the elder cousin and the son of the previous bailli, Isabella.

The philosopher Thomas Aquinas wrote the tractate De regno, ad regem Cypri in 1265–1266 and addressed it to King Hugh. (Note: Stephen of Lusignan wrote that the intended recipient of De regno was Hugh II's successor, Hugh of Antioch (Hugh III). Modern historians consider Hugh II the likelier candidate because the book's author was a subject of King Charles I of Sicily, a rival of Hugh III; it was never completed, which may be explained by the early death of the intended recipient; and the exhortative tone was not suited to addressing an adult.) Thomas was a proponent of absolute monarchy and may have hoped to influence the young king at a time when Hugh of Antioch was struggling to control the barons of Cyprus. Thomas never finished the book probably because of the king's early death.

=== Marriage and succession ===
By May 1265, a marriage was being planned between Hugh and Isabella of Ibelin, lady of Beirut. On 21 May, Pope Clement IV granted a dispensation, which was necessary because Hugh and Isabella were fourth cousins. Only one near-contemporary source, the Lignages d'Outremer, states that the marriage was concluded. They had no children, and probably did not consummate their union.

Hugh died in November or on 5 December 1267, shortly before he was to reach his majority on his fifteenth birthday. The preparations for his marriage with Isabella of Ibelin suggest that he had not been expected to die so young, but his mother had died at about 25 at most and his grandfather King Hugh I at 23. The first dynasty of the Lusignan kings of Cyprus thus ended. He was buried in the grand chapel of the Church of Saint Dominic in Nicosia, which he had enriched and endowed with privileges. Hugh II's cousin and regent, Hugh of Antioch, was crowned king of Cyprus on Christmas, but the other namesake cousin, Hugh of Brienne, continued to regard himself as the rightful successor.

Hugh's relationship with the kings and queens (bold) and regents (italics) of Jerusalem and the other rulers of the Latin East

Conrad of Montferrat	Isabella I of Jerusalem	Henry II of Champagne	Bohemond IV of Antioch	Plaisance of Gibelet
Maria of Jerusalem	Alice of Champagne	Hugh I of Cyprus	Bohemond V of Antioch	Lucia of Segni
Isabella II of Jerusalem	Maria of Cyprus	Isabella of Cyprus	Henry of Antioch	Henry I of Cyprus	Plaisance of Antioch	Bohemond VI of Antioch
Conrad II of Jerusalem	Hugh of Brienne	Hugh III of Cyprus	Hugh II of Cyprus
Conrad III of Jerusalem

== Notes ==
Regnal titles
Preceded by Henry I	King of Cyprus; 1253–1267	Succeeded by Hugh III
