= Plaisance of Antioch =

Queen of Cyprus from 1250 to 1253

Queen consort of Cyprus
- Tenure: 1250–1253

Regent of Cyprus
- Regency: 1253–1261
- Monarch: Hugh II

Regent of Jerusalem
- Regency: 1258–1261
- Monarch: Conrad III
- Born: Late 1230s
- Died: 22 or 27 September 1261 (Note: The Annales de Terre Sainte state that Plaisance died on 25 December. All other 13th-century sources place her death in September. Eracles gives 22 September, while the Chronicle of Amadi and the Gestes des Chiprois give 27 September. September is likelier than December.)
- Spouse: Henry I of Cyprus; Balian of Arsuf
- Issue: Hugh II of Cyprus
- House: Poitiers
- Father: Bohemond V of Antioch
- Mother: Lucia of Segni

Plaisance of Antioch (late 1230s–1261) was a Cypriot queen dowager who ruled the kingdoms of Cyprus and Jerusalem as regent from 1253 and 1258, respectively, until her death. She was the third wife of King Henry I of Cyprus and the mother of his only child, King Hugh II.

Hugh II succeeded to the throne as a minor, and the widowed Plaisance took up government in his name. She took Balian of Arsuf as her second husband in 1254, but separated from him in 1255. She attempted to marry herself and her son into the English royal family, but did not succeed. In 1258, she travelled to Acre with her son and was recognized as his bailli (lieutenant) in his capacity as titular regent for his kinsman King Conrad III of Jerusalem. As such, she intervened in the war waged by the Venetians and their allies against the Genoese and their allies, supporting the former. Around that time she became involved with a married man, Count John of Jaffa, prompting Pope Urban IV to write an admonishing letter. She may have never received it, having died around the same time.

== Early life ==
Plaisance was born, at the earliest, either in 1235 or mid-1239, depending on the dating of the marriage of her parents, Bohemond V and Lucia of Segni. Plaisance's father was the ruler of the Principality of Antioch and the County of Tripoli; he preferred to reside in Tripoli. The historian Hans E. Mayer follows the Estoire d'Eracles in dating Bohemond V and Lucia's marriage to 1238 and concludes that Plaisance was younger than her brother, Bohemond VI.

In September 1250, Plaisance became the third wife of the childless King Henry I of Cyprus. Henry was the closest kin in the Latin East of King Conrad IV of Germany and thus also ruled Conrad's Kingdom of Jerusalem as regent. Plaisance's father, Bohemond V, died in January 1252; her brother, Bohemond VI, succeeded him. King Henry was obese and apparently expected to die childless; Queen Plaisance's pregnancy and the birth of their son, Hugh, in late 1252 or early 1253 may have prompted John of Ibelin's unusual appeal for papal recognition of his title to the lordship of Beirut, which Henry had given to him at the expense of any issue that might be born to Henry.

== Regency ==
=== Insular issues ===
Plaisance's husband, King Henry, died on 18 January 1253, leaving the throne to their son, Hugh II. The High Court of Cyprus promptly accepted Plaisance as her son's guardian and regent. The government of the Kingdom of Jerusalem alternated between its constable and incumbent bailli (lieutenant), John of Arsuf, and his cousin John, count of Jaffa.

The archbishop of Nicosia, Hugh of Fagiano, who had gone into exile due to a quarrel with King Henry, returned after his death; he probably expected more freedom of action now that a woman led the government. Yet he soon came into conflict with Plaisance too–and with the clergy, the nobles, and his parishioners. He complained to Pope Alexander IV that the queen refused to defend him, and Alexander reprimanded her for an alleged mistreatment of the archbishop. (Note: Archimandrite Kyprianos wrote in the 18th century that Plaisance was responsible for the reorganization of the Church in Cyprus. Relying on Stephen of Lusignan and Gianfrancesco Loredan, writers from the 16th and 17th century respectively, Kyprianos states that in 1255 Plaisance wrote to Pope Alexander to request a solution for the conflict between the Latin and Greek clergy in Cyprus, resulting in the pope's issuance of the Bulla Cypria. Contemporary sources do not mention the queen or any other secular authority with respect to the Bulla Cypria. She most likely had nothing to do with it.)

Plaisance decided to ally with the Ibelin family to bolster her rule; in 1254, she married Balian, the eldest son of John of Arsuf and second cousin of her first husband, King Henry. Plaisance was 14 or 19 at the most and Balian 16. By the middle of 1255, they had separated. The queen appealed to Pope Alexander for an annulment, saying that she had separated from Balian before they received a papal dispensation for their marriage and alleging that Balian had seized her property and regency. Alexander then instructed Hugh of Fagiano and the bishop of Famagusta, Stephen of Mezel, to investigate Plaisance's allegations and, if true, to see to it that Balian return government and property to Plaisance. Balian stated that he and Plaisance had taken an oath to marry if they obtained a dispensation and that they had already married by the time Innocent IV, Alexander's predecessor, granted the dispensation. Plaisance then asserted that she had only sworn to marry Balian if her brother, Bohemond, agreed to the marriage. Bohemond, in fact, actively opposed the match.

Plaisance appears to have made contact with the English court in 1255, soon after her separation from Balian of Arsuf. King Henry III of England intended to undertake a crusade to the Holy Land and Plaisance probably thought that he might become influential in the Latin East. In 1256, her envoys brought a proposal that she marry Henry's son Edmund and that her son marry Henry's daughter Beatrice. Nothing came of this, probably because of the scheme to put Edmund on the Sicilian throne.

=== Mainland affairs ===
Plaisance's place within the ruling families of the Latin East

Conrad of Montferrat	Isabella I of Jerusalem	Henry II of Champagne	Bohemond IV of Antioch	Plaisance of Gibelet
Maria of Jerusalem	Alice of Champagne	Hugh I of Cyprus	Bohemond V of Antioch	Lucia of Segni
Isabella II of Jerusalem	Maria of Cyprus	Isabella of Cyprus	Henry of Antioch	Henry I of Cyprus	Plaisance of Antioch	Bohemond VI of Antioch
Conrad II of Jerusalem	Hugh of Brienne	Hugh III of Cyprus	Hugh II of Cyprus
Conrad III of Jerusalem

A civil war was raging in the Kingdom of Jerusalem between two rival factions: the Templars, Venetians, and Pisans against the Hospitallers, Genoese, and Catalans. The Ibelin-led government had sided with the Genoese, but when the tide turned against them in late 1257, the government had to change sides; to do this without losing face, they decided to again invite the next-in-line to the throne to take charge as regent. John of Jaffa and the master of the Temple, Thomas Berard, urged Bohemond VI of Antioch to bring Plaisance and her son to Acre, the kingdom's capital.

Plaisance ruled the two kingdoms of the Latin East while her brother ruled the two northern mainland states.

Plaisance sailed with Hugh from Cyprus to Tripoli, where she met with Bohemond. They arrived in Acre on 1 February 1258. Bohemond urged the High Court of Jerusalem to acknowledge Hugh as King Conrad III's heir and lord of the kingdom in the absence of the king with Plaisance as Hugh's bailli. The Templars, the Teutonic Knights, most of the barons, and the Venetian and Pisan delegates swore fealty to Hugh, but the Hospitallers and their allies insisted that nothing could be decided in Conrad's absence. Plaisance was elected bailli by a majority vote and her father-in-law, John of Arsuf, duly resigned the bailliage to her. She was only distantly related to Conrad and received the regency on account of her relationship to her son.

As soon as Plaisance took up the government of the Kingdom of Jerusalem, she and her brother launched a determined attack on the Genoese in Acre. She ordered all crown vassals to abandon the Genoese, whom Bohemond tried to starve out, and to support the Venetians. John of Arsuf and his son Balian, Plaisance's estranged husband, then reconciled with Plaisance and Bohemond. They agreed to the annulment of Plaisance and Balian's marriage and in return Plaisance appointed John as her bailli. He was instructed to sternly deal with the rebels. Plaisance and her son withdrew with her brother to Tripoli, from where they returned to Cyprus. Plaisance's regency was made effective by Bohemond's military assistance: he provided 800 men-at-arms to force the Genoese and their allies to cease fighting in Acre, though without success. The Venetians soon triumphed nevertheless.

In 1258, Pope Alexander granted Plaisance's request and annulled her marriage with Balian of Arsuf. His father, John, died soon after his reappointment to the bailliage and Plaisance returned to Acre on 1 May 1259 to install Geoffrey of Sergines, seneschal of Jerusalem, as her new bailli. The Latin patriarch of Jerusalem, James Pantaleon, supported Plaisance's regime on the mainland. At some point Plaisance entered into a sexual relationship with John of Jaffa. He was a married man, and their affair may have become common knowledge by early 1261. Pantaleon, who became Pope Urban IV on 29 August, chastisised Plaisance for the relationship in a letter. (Note: The letter is addressed to "the queen", and the identities of this queen, her lover, and the admonishing pope were long debated, with Isabella of Ibelin being the other woman considered. Later editions contain evidence that the letter dates from around 1261 and is therefore addressed to Plaisance.) Plaisance died on 22 or 27 September 1261. Urban IV could not have been aware until at least late October, and the letter may not have been finished. She was succeeded as regent by her cousin Hugh of Antioch.

== Historiography ==
Chronicles from the Republic of Venice, which Plaisance supported in their war against Genoa, describe her as a woman of character and high moral integrity. Modern historians offer different interpretations of the queen and her agency. Peter W. Edbury presumes, although cautiously, that she was a pawn successively of her second husband, Balian; her brother, Bohemond; and her lover, John of Jaffa. Simon D. Lloyd and Hans E. Mayer, on the other hand, attribute political decisions to Plaisance herself.

== Notes ==
Royal titles
Vacant Title last held by Stephanie of Lampron	Queen consort of Cyprus; 1250–1254	Vacant Title next held by Isabella of Ibelin
