= Hugh of Brienne =

Count of Brienne and Lecce

Hugh, Count of Brienne
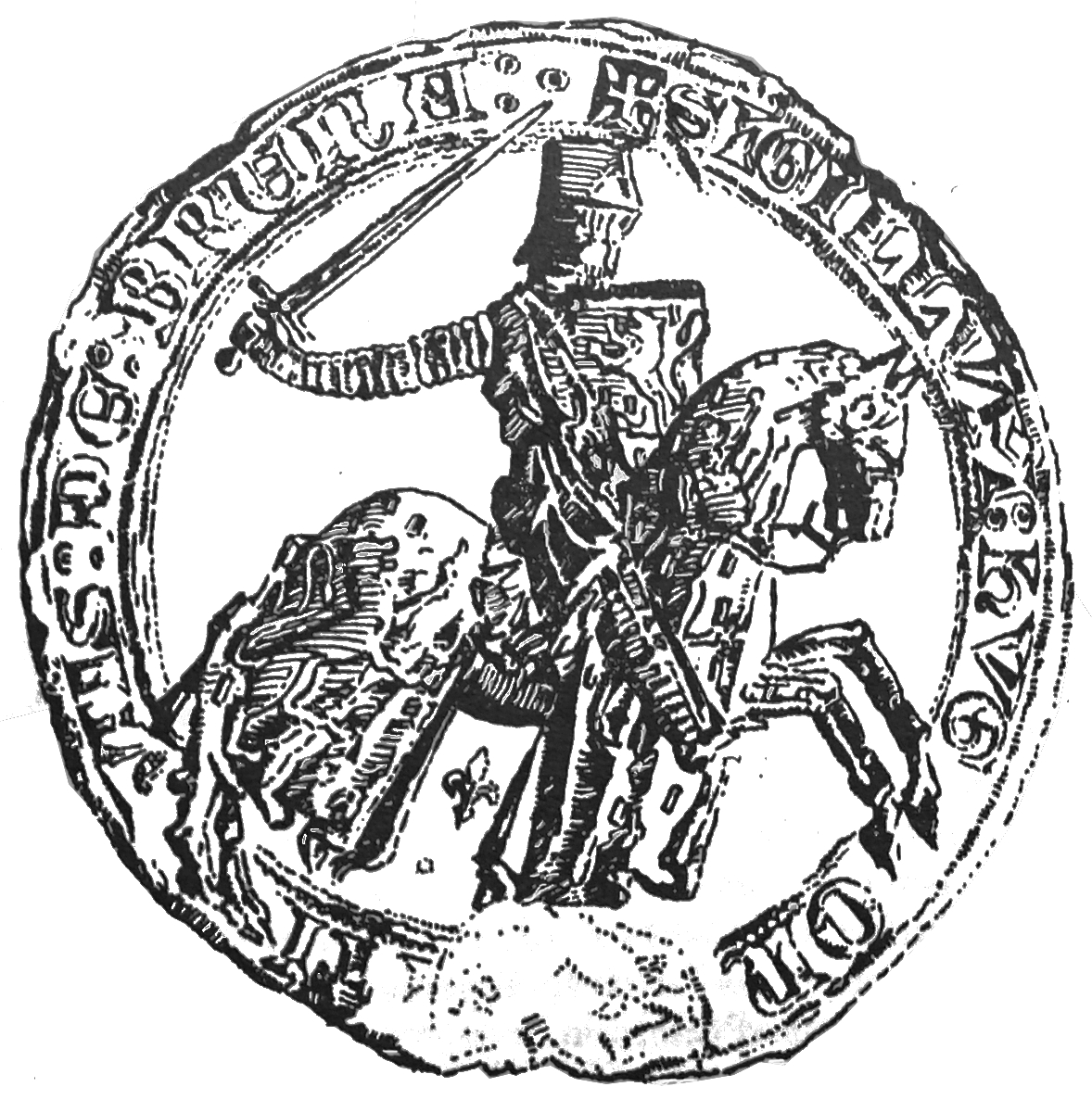
- Seal of Hugh of Brienne
- Born: c. 1240
- Died: 9 August 1296
- Noble family: House of Brienne
- Spouses: Isabella de la Roche; Helena Angelina Komnene
- Issue: Walter V, Count of Brienne
- Father: Walter IV of Brienne
- Mother: Marie de Lusignan

Hugh, Count of Brienne and Lecce (c. 1240 – 9 August 1296) was the second surviving son of Count Walter IV of Brienne and Marie de Lusignan of Cyprus.

== Life ==
His father, Count of Jaffa and Ascalon in Palestine, was murdered in 1244 in Cairo, and was succeeded by his eldest son, John.

On John's death (c. 1260), Hugh inherited the County of Brienne in France and the family's claims in southern Italy, including the Principality of Taranto and the County of Lecce, which had been confiscated in 1205.

He claimed the regency of the Kingdom of Jerusalem (and indirectly a place in the succession) in 1264 as senior heir to Alice of Jerusalem and Hugh I of Cyprus, being the son of their eldest daughter, but was passed over by the Haute Cour in favour of his cousin Hugh of Antioch and thereafter took little part in the affairs of Outremer. His first cousin, King Hugh II of Cyprus, died in 1267 and despite Hugh's rights as senior heir, Hugh of Antioch was crowned Hugh III of Cyprus. When his second cousin's son Conradin, King of Jerusalem, was killed in 1268, the succession passed again to his junior cousin Hugh III.

Deciding to seek his fortune in Europe rather than Outremer, Hugh entered the service of Charles I of Naples. Charles made him Captain-General of Brindisi, Otranto and Apulia and Lord of Conversano, and he was an enthusiastic partisan of the Angevin cause in Italy. For this service he was restored to his family's County of Lecce. He was captured with Charles II of Naples in the Battle of the Gulf of Naples in 1284 and again in the Battle of the Counts in 1287, both times in naval battles against Roger of Lauria. After his second capture, the Sicilians demanded a very large ransom from Hugh; the Count of Brienne paid this, and also sent his son and heir Walter as a hostage.

In 1291 he married Helena Angelina Komnene, widow of William de la Roche, Duke of Athens, and regent for her underage son Guy II de la Roche. He thus became Bailli of the Duchy of Athens until Guy II came of age in 1296.

=== Death ===
In late 1295, Hugh was given command of Angevin troops in Apulia and the port of Brindisi by Charles II of Naples. In early 1296, the new king of Sicily, Frederick III, launched an offensive against the Angevins in lower Italy. As part of this offensive, a Sicilian fleet under Roger of Lauria raided Brindisi, during which Hugh was killed.

== Marriages and issue ==
Hugh's first wife was Isabella de la Roche, heiress of Thebes. They had a son, Walter V (d. 1311), who succeeded Hugh, and a daughter, Agnes, who married Count John of Joigny. Hugh and his second wife, Helena Angelina Komnene, had a daughter, Joanna, who married Duke Nicholas I Sanudo of Naxos.

== Genealogical table ==
Hugh's relationship to the rulers of Champagne, Jerusalem, and Cyprus

Erard II of Brienne	Agnes of Montbéliard	Conrad of Montferrat	Isabella I of Jerusalem	Henry II of Champagne
Elvira of Lecce	Walter III of Brienne	John of Brienne	Maria of Jerusalem	Alice of Champagne	Hugh I of Cyprus
Walter IV of Brienne	Maria of Cyprus	Henry I of Cyprus	Isabella of Cyprus
Isabella II of Jerusalem
John of Brienne	Hugh of Brienne	Hugh II of Cyprus	Hugh III of Cyprus & Jerusalem
Conrad II of Jerusalem
Conrad III of Jerusalem

== Sources ==
- Longnon, Jean (1969). "The Frankish States in Greece, 1204–1311". In Wolff, Robert Lee; Hazard, Harry W. (eds.). A History of the Crusades, Volume II: The Later Crusades, 1189–1311. University of Wisconsin Press. pp. 234–275.
- Perry, Guy (2018). The Briennes: The Rise and Fall of a Champenois Dynasty in the Age of the Crusades, c. 950–1356. Cambridge University Press. ISBN 1107196906.

Hugh of Brienne House of Brienne Born: c. 1240 Died: 9 August 1296
Preceded by John	Count of Brienne c. 1260–1296	Succeeded by Walter V of Brienne
Vacant Title last held by Walter IV of Brienne	Count of Lecce; 1260–1296	Succeeded by Walter V of Brienne
Vacant Title last held by Philip Chinard	Count of Conversano; 1269–1296	Succeeded by Walter V of Brienne
