= Isabella of Cyprus =

Regent of Jerusalem from 1263 to 1264

Isabella of Cyprus (Old French: Isabel; died in 1264) was a princess of the House of Lusignan. She was the heir presumptive to the Kingdom of Cyprus during the reign of her minor nephew King Hugh II, but ceded the right to rule the kingdom as regent to her son, Hugh of Antioch. In 1263 she claimed the regency of the Kingdom of Jerusalem, but was granted limited powers by its High Court. She then returned to Cyprus, where she died soon after.

== War of the Lombards ==
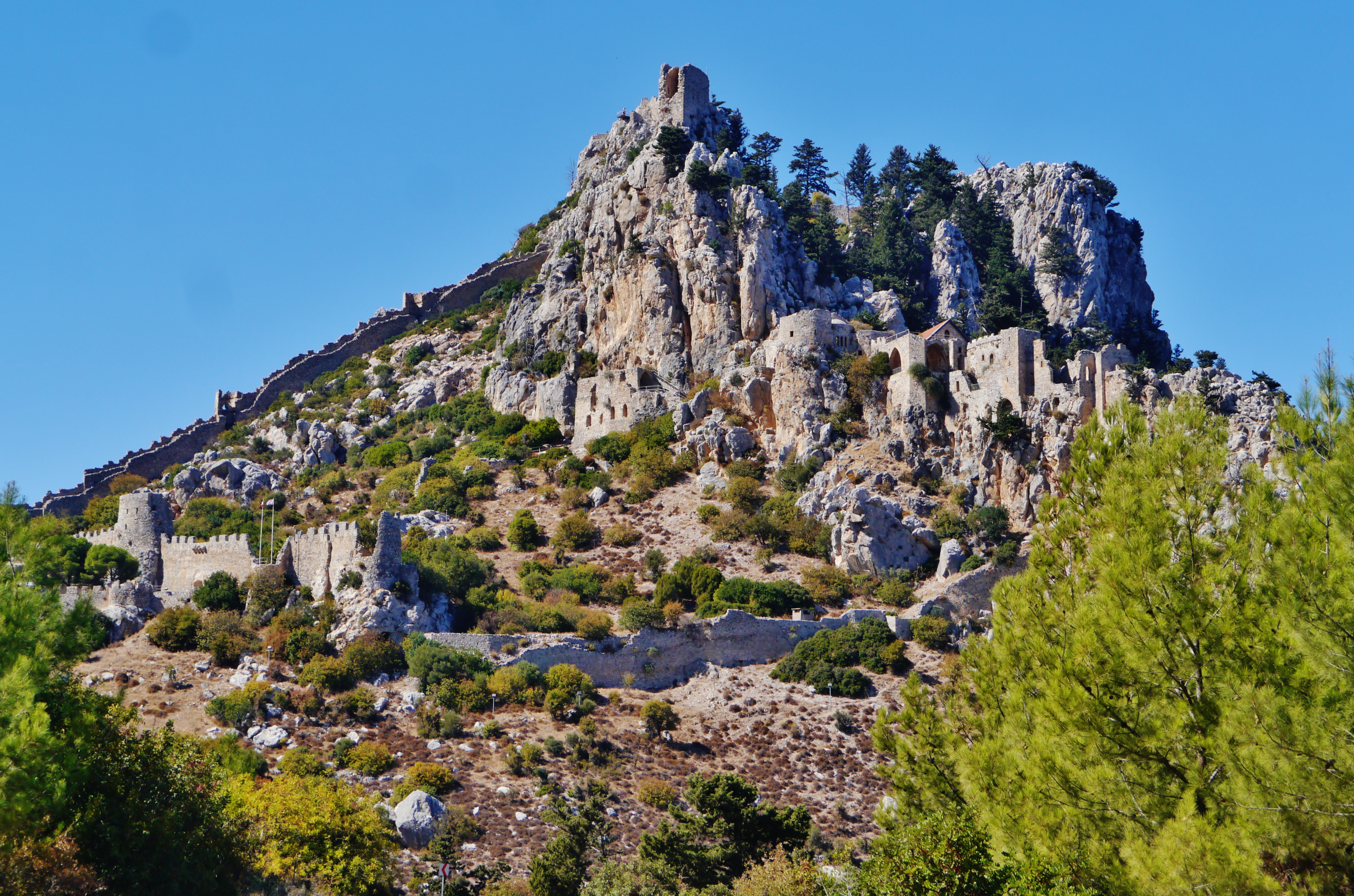
Isabella and her siblings spent time at Dieudamour at various times during the War of the Lombards

Isabella was the younger daughter of King Hugh I of Cyprus and Alice of Champagne, who married around 1210. Upon the death of King Hugh in 1218, the throne of Cyprus passed to Isabella's infant brother, Henry I. Queen Alice's uncles Philip and John of Ibelin took power, but Holy Roman Emperor Frederick II claimed the right to rule Cyprus as suzerain during Henry's minority. A long conflict known as the War of the Lombards ensued between the Imperialist and the Ibelin factions. After the sieges of Dieudamour and Kantara in 1230, the Imperialists surrendered Henry, Isabella, and their sister, Maria, to the Ibelins.

A marriage between Isabella and Henry of Antioch, the youngest son of Prince Bohemond IV of Antioch, was envisioned as early as March 1227, when Pope Honorius III entrusted the inquiry into their consanguinity to the Latin patriarch of Jerusalem and the bishop of Acre. The union was promoted by John of Ibelin, Isabella's granduncle and the leading nobleman of the kingdoms of Cyprus and Jerusalem. In 1232 he sent an embassy under his son Balian, Lord of Beirut to Bohemond IV's court at Tripoli to negotiate Isabella's marriage. When the Imperialists overran Cyprus in 1232, Isabella and Maria took shelter at Dieudamour.

Isabella married Henry around 1233, after the defeat of the Imperialists in Cyprus. Isabella's brother granted substantial lands on Cyprus to her husband. The couple had two children, Hugh and Margaret. After the death of her sister, Maria, Isabella raised Maria's son Hugh of Brienne alongside her son, Hugh of Antioch, and he regarded her as his mother.

== Regency ==
Isabella's mother, Queen Alice of Cyprus, was the daughter of Queen Isabella I of Jerusalem. In 1243, the High Court of Jerusalem elected Alice to rule the Kingdom of Jerusalem as regent in the name of King Conrad II, who lived in Europe. When she died in 1246, her son King Henry I of Cyprus was recognized as the new regent of the mainland kingdom. Isabella's brother was a pliant king whose rule was dominated by their Ibelin kin; his lethargy may have been connected with his obesity. He was apparently not expected to leave children. (Note: During the deliberations about the regency of the Kingdom of Jerusalem after her death, Isabella's son argued that the regency of that kingdom would have escheated to Isabella if her brother had only died childless.) Sometime after November or December 1252, a son was born to King Henry and his third wife, Plaisance of Antioch. King Henry died on 18 January 1253, and was succeeded by his newborn son, King Hugh II.

Hugh II was regarded as the heir presumptive of King Conrad III of Jerusalem, who lived in Europe, and was entitled to rule the mainland kingdom too as regent. But since Hugh also required a regent on account of his minority, it was his mother, Queen Plaisance, who governed. Plaisance died in 1261. As the young king's only surviving aunt and closest relative, Isabella was the heir presumptive to the throne and entitled to be the next regent of Cyprus. She stood aside and allowed her son, Hugh of Antioch, to take up the regency. Hugh of Brienne, though the son of the elder of Henry I's sisters, did not counter the claim of Hugh of Antioch; in 1264, he said that he had refrained from doing so out of respect for his aunt who had raised him.

Geoffrey of Sergines, Queen Plaisance's delegate, continued to rule the Kingdom of Jerusalem after her death. The right to exercise regency of Jerusalem on behalf of the minor regent, Hugh II, remained unclaimed by his family until 1263. Isabella stepped forward only after the Mamluk ruler of Egypt, Baibars, attacked Acre, the seat of the royal government. She then came to Acre with her husband, Henry. The law stated that the claimant to bailliage had to bring their ward when appearing before the High Court of Jerusalem. Since Isabella failed to do so, the High Court restricted her rule and refused to do homage and fealty to her. She then returned to Cyprus, leaving Henry to act on her behalf.

Isabella died in 1264 (Note: The Venetian Chronicle of Amadi records Isabella's death and burial under 1263. The historian George Francis Hill notes that in medieval Venice, the year began in March, and argues that Isabella probably died in early 1264. Eracles mentions her death at the end of the year, after the death of Pope Urban IV (early October 1264). The historian Jonathan Riley-Smith concludes that Isabella probably died in the latter half of 1264.) and was buried in the Cathedral of Saint Sophia in Nicosia. She was succeeded as regent by her son, Hugh of Antioch; when her nephew, Hugh of Brienne, countered his claim to the regency, Hugh of Antioch invoked his closer relationship with the previous holder of the office, Isabella. After the deaths of Hugh II and Conrad III, Isabella's son became king of Cyprus and Jerusalem.

Isabella's relationship with the kings and regents of Cyprus and Jerusalem

Isabella I of Jerusalem
Maria of Jerusalem	Alice of Champagne	Hugh I of Cyprus
Isabella II of Jerusalem	Maria of Cyprus	Isabella of Cyprus	Henry of Antioch	Henry I of Cyprus	Plaisance of Antioch
Conrad II of Jerusalem	Hugh of Brienne	Hugh III of Cyprus	Hugh II of Cyprus
Conrad III of Jerusalem
