= Alice of Champagne =

Queen of Cyprus from 1210 to 1218

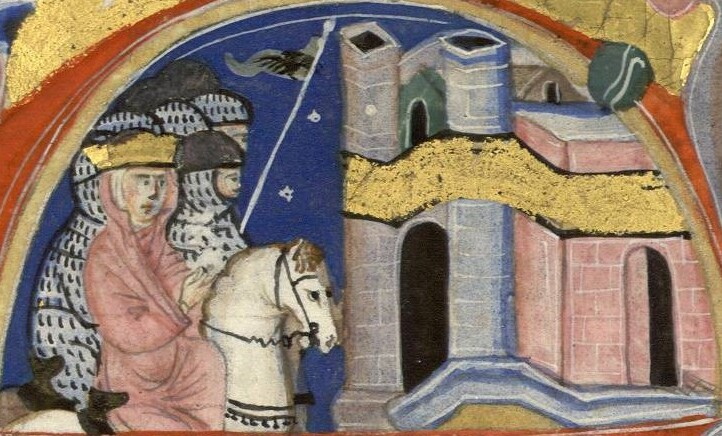
- Alice's arrival at Acre

Queen consort of Cyprus
- Tenure: c. 1210 – 1218

Regent of Cyprus (absent from Cyprus from 1224)
- Tenure: 1218–1232
- Monarch: Henry I

Regent of Jerusalem Contested by Emperor Frederick II
- Tenure: 1243–1246
- Monarch: Conrad II
- Co-regent: Ralph of Soissons (1243)

Countess of Jaffa
- Tenure: 1210–1233
- Predecessor: Aimery of Lusignan
- Successor: Walter of Brienne
- Born: c. 1193
- Died: 1246 (aged 52–53)
- Spouses: Hugh I, King of Cyprus; Bohemond V, Prince of Antioch; Ralph of Soissons
- Issue: Mary, Countess of Brienne; Isabella, Regent of Jerusalem; Henry I, King of Cyprus
- House: House of Blois
- Father: Henry II, Count of Champagne
- Mother: Isabella I, Queen of Jerusalem

Alice of Champagne (French: Alix; c. 1193 – 1246) was the queen consort of Cyprus from 1210 to 1218, regent of Cyprus from 1218 to 1232, and regent of Jerusalem from 1243 to 1246. She was the daughter of Queen Isabella I of Jerusalem and Count Henry II of Champagne. Around 1210, Alice married her stepbrother Hugh I of Cyprus, receiving the County of Jaffa as her dowry. After her husband's death in 1218, she assumed the regency for their infant son, King Henry I, but her maternal uncle Philip of Ibelin became the actual head of state administration as bailli (governor).

Alice began seeking contacts within her father's counties in France to bolster her claim to Champagne and Brie against her cousin Theobald IV, but the kings of France never acknowledged her claim. After a dispute with Philip of Ibelin, she left the island in 1223. She married Bohemond, heir apparent to the Principality of Antioch and the County of Tripoli, but their marriage was annulled on grounds of consanguinity—they were too closely related according to canon law. In 1229, she laid claim to the Kingdom of Jerusalem against her infant great-nephew Conrad, who was absent from the kingdom, but the High Court of Jerusalem rejected her claim. When her son reached the age of majority in 1232, Alice abdicated her regency and departed for France to claim Champagne and Brie. She subsequently renounced her claim and returned to the Holy Land.

In 1240, Alice married the much younger Ralph of Soissons. The High Court of Jerusalem proclaimed Alice and Ralph regents for Conrad in 1243, but their power was only nominal. Ralph left the kingdom, and Alice, before the end of the year. Alice retained the regency until her death in 1246.

== Childhood ==
Alice, born c. 1193, was the daughter of Queen Isabella I of Jerusalem and her third husband, Count Henry II of Champagne. The Kingdom of Jerusalem had been established by western European knights in Palestine in the aftermath of the First Crusade in 1100 but was nearly annihilated by the Egyptian sultan Saladin in 1187–1189. The kingdom and two other Crusader states—the Principality of Antioch and County of Tripoli—survived in a small strip along the eastern Mediterranean coast due to the Third Crusade, proclaimed by the papacy for their rescue, but the city of Jerusalem remained in Muslim hands. Isabella's first marriage with the Jerusalemite aristocrat Humphrey IV of Toron had been annulled in preparation for her second marriage with an ambitious crusader leader, Conrad of Montferrat. As the only surviving child of King Amalric of Jerusalem, Isabella had a strong claim to rule the remnants of the kingdom along with her new husband. Their joint rule did not last long as Conrad was murdered by two members of the Assassins in 1192. Urged by her subjects, the widowed Isabella quickly agreed to remarry. As a nephew of both Kings Richard I of England and Philip II of France, Henry was an ideal candidate. Before joining the Third Crusade, he had bequeathed his French counties of Champagne and Brie to his brother, Theobald, should he die without issue.

Henry married Isabella in May 1192 and assumed power in the Kingdom of Jerusalem, although he was never crowned king. They had two children who survived childhood, Alice and her younger sister Philippa. Henry promised his eldest surviving daughter in marriage to the eldest surviving son of Aimery of Lusignan, lord of Cyprus, with the County of Jaffa as her dowry. Henry died unexpectedly when he fell from a tower in his palace in Acre on 10 September 1197. A month later, his widow chose Aimery, who had recently been crowned the first king of Cyprus, as her fourth husband, while Philip II of France invested not the late count's daughters but his brother, Theobald III, with Champagne and Brie in January 1198. Theobald III died on 24 May 1201, leaving the counties under the regency of his widow Blanche of Navarre, who soon gave birth to a son, Theobald IV. Theobald IV's position was not secure because Alice and Philippa, both born while their father was count, could challenge their cousin's claim to his counties.

Alice's mother and stepfather, Queen Isabella and King Aimery, both died in 1205. Maria, Isabella's fourteen-year-old daughter by Conrad of Montferrat, ascended the throne while Isabella's half-brother John of Ibelin assumed the regency for the young queen. As Maria's eldest half-sister, Alice became heir presumptive, and she was placed under the guardianship of their maternal grandmother Maria Komnene.

Genealogy of the ruling houses of Jerusalem and Champagne

Amalric of Jerusalem	Maria Komnene
John of Ibelin
Conrad of Montferrat	Isabella I of Jerusalem
Maria of Jerusalem	Hugh I of Cyprus
Frederick II of Germany	Isabella II of Jerusalem	Henry I of Cyprus
Conrad II of Jerusalem	Hugh II of Cyprus

Balian of Ibelin
Henry I of Champagne	Marie of France
Philip of Ibelin
Henry II of Champagne	Theobald III of Champagne	Blanche of Navarre
Alice of Champagne	Philippa of Champagne	Erard of Ramerupt	Theobald IV of Champagne
Maria of Cyprus	Walter IV of Brienne	Isabella of Cyprus
Hugh of Brienne	Hugh III of Cyprus

== Cyprus ==
=== Queen consort ===
Maria Komnene conducted the negotiations for the marriage of Alice to King Hugh I of Cyprus, Aimery of Lusignan's son and successor, in accordance with the agreement their fathers had reached. Since the marriage of Alice's mother and Hugh’s father made them step-siblings, a special dispensation was needed and was granted by Pope Innocent III. Blanche of Navarre paid part of her niece's dowry to ensure that she would stay in Cyprus rather than attempt to lay claim to Champagne and Brie. To strengthen her son's position, Blanche also persuaded Philip II of France in 1209 to promise that he would not allow anyone to challenge Theobald IV's right to the two counties before Theobald reached the age of majority.

Alice and Hugh married probably in 1210, with Alice receiving the County of Jaffa as the agreed upon dowry. They had two daughters, Maria and Isabella, and a son, Henry. Alice's sister, Philippa, married Erard of Ramerupt, who laid claim to Champagne and Brie on Philippa's behalf in 1213, leading to a succession war. Blanche soon approached the Holy See to demand an investigation into the validity of the second and third marriages of Alice's mother, stating that her first marriage to Humphrey of Toron had not been annulled in accordance with canon law. The inquiry conducted by Cardinal Robert of Courçon at the Pope's order concluded that both Humphrey and Isabella had protested against the annulment of their marriage, implying that her two subsequent marriages were void. If the inquiry had been completed, Alice and her sisters Maria and Philippa could have lost their claim to the Kingdom of Jerusalem, for children born to parents whose marriage was declared void were regarded as illegitimate. Probably to avoid such undesirable political consequences, as the historian Bernard Hamilton notes, the investigation was not "pursued with any degree of rigour".

=== Regent ===
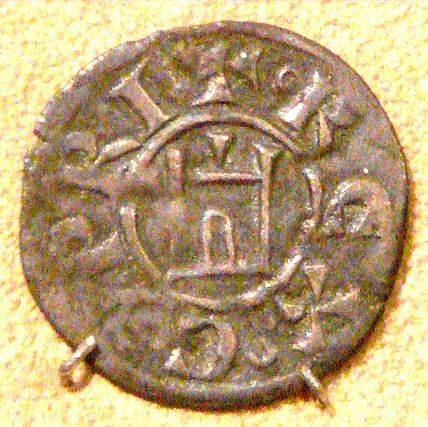
Coin of Alice's son, Henry I of Cyprus

After Hugh I died in Tripoli on 10 January 1218, Alice assumed the regency for their infant son, Henry I, and installed her uncle Philip of Ibelin as bailli (governor). According to the contemporaneous lawyer Philip of Novara, Hugh arranged the administration of the kingdom on his deathbed. Another contemporaneous source, the Chronicle of Ernoul and Bernard the Treasurer, suggests that Alice acted independently. Finally, a papal letter of February 1226 states that the Cypriot nobles, barons, knights, and people elected Philip of Ibelin as bailli. Pope Honorius III instructed his legate, Cardinal Pelagius Galvani, to protect Alice and her children against "certain men inspired with wicked fervour", suggesting that she faced some opposition at the beginning of her regency. Her regency set a precedent, for no queen mothers had previously assumed regency for an underage son in Jerusalem or Cyprus, but the appointment of her uncle as the actual governor indicates a deep-seated aversion to female rulers.

In 1218, Alice's brother-in-law Erard of Ramerupt renounced his wife's claim to Champagne in return for compensation, even promising to support Theobald IV against Alice. This led Alice to send envoys to Champagne, prompting her aunt Blanche to make a complaint against her at the Holy See on 23 June 1219. Alice entered into negotiations with Pelagius about the status of the Church in Cyprus where the native Greek population adhered to the autocephalous (or autonomous) local Orthodox Church. Either under the influence of her Byzantine grandmother, or for political considerations, Alice protected the interests of the Orthodox clergy. She achieved a compromise at an assembly of the Cypriot aristocrats and Catholic prelates in Pelagius's presence in October 1220. On her demand, the Orthodox priests were exempted from taxation, and she also prevented the abolition of the Orthodox hierarchy on the island, as the Pope permitted the appointment of Orthodox suffragan bishops in the four Catholic dioceses. The compromise also included obligating the Cypriot aristocrats to pay a tithe for the maintencance of the Latin hierarchy, which they opposed. On the other hand, the Holy See demanded that the estates the nobles had seized from the Orthodox Church be transferred to Catholic clerics. A new agreement, reached in 1222, sanctioned the status quo, as it neither freed the noblemen from the tithe nor prescribed the restoration of Church property.

Rumours that Alice would marry William II of Dampierre, constable of Champagne, spread in France in 1223. In August that year, Pope Honorius forbade the marriage at Theobald IV's behest, emphasizing that Alice and William were closely related. According to the "Chronicle of the Holy Land" section of the Gestes des Chiprois, Alice "spent the revenues of the kingdom liberally", resulting in conflict with Philip of Ibelin. She furiously accused Philip of disrespecting her wishes and voluntarily retired from Cyprus in 1224. She settled in either Tripoli or Jaffa, but her children remained on the island.

== In exile ==
=== Conflicts ===
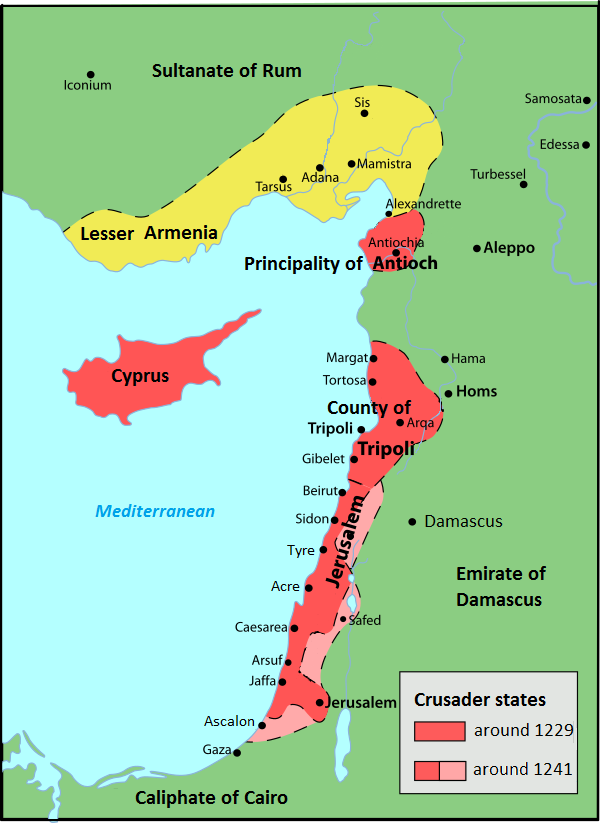
Crusader states in the middle of the 13th century

Around late 1224 or early 1225, Alice married Bohemond, heir apparent to Antioch and Tripoli. Pope Honorius ordered Archbishop Eustorgius of Nicosia to inquire into the legality of the marriage, probably on the request of Cypriot barons who did not want her new husband to intervene in the government of Cyprus. Alice, who continued to regard herself as regent, was planning to appoint Bohemond as bailli, but the Cypriot barons resisted her plan, saying that Bohemond would probably mistreat their young king. Alice then offered the office to Aimery Barlais, who was amenable, but the High Court—the supreme tribunal in the kingdom—ruled that Alice could not replace Philip of Ibelin who had been made bailli for the duration of her son's minority. Barlais left the island to join Alice, while his supporter Gavin of Chenichy visited Holy Roman Emperor Frederick II, who had decided to launch the Sixth Crusade for the Holy Land.

Emperor Frederick II regarded himself as overlord of Cyprus because his father, Emperor Henry VI, had sent the royal crown to Aimery of Lusignan. On Philip of Ibelin's initiative, the High Court arranged the coronation of the eight-year-old Henry without the Emperor's consent in 1225, drawing Frederick's ire. The marriage of Frederick and Queen Isabella II of Jerusalem, daughter and successor of Alice's half-sister Maria, had been decided in 1223. Alice attended Isabella's coronation in Tyre before Isabella departed for Italy to meet Frederick in 1225. Either Frederick or Alice and Bohemond's envoys persuaded the dying Pope Honorius to delegate two new judges (the Latin patriarch of Jerusalem, Gerold of Lausanne, and the bishop of Acre, Jacques de Vitry) to investigate the marriage of Alice and Bohemond, accusing Eustorgius of partiality in the couple's favour. Honorius III's decision was confirmed by his successor, Pope Gregory IX. Alice and her husband came to Limassol in summer 1227 intending to meet Frederick, but illness prevented Frederick from departing Italy. Alice and Bohemond's marriage was subsequently annulled but the circumstances of the process are unknown.

When Philip of Ibelin died in 1227, the High Court appointed his brother John as bailli without consulting Frederick or Alice. Frederick departed for Cyprus, landing at Limassol on 21 July 1228. Upon arriving, he ordered John of Ibelin to account for the administration of royal revenue, but John refused, stating that the revenue had been paid to Alice. Frederick dismissed John and forced Henry to swear fealty to him. He also demanded an oath of fealty from the Cypriot noblemen, but they were only willing to submit to him as their king's overlord, declaring that they only owed fealty to Alice who served as regent to their king. Frederick made Aimery Barlais, Gavin of Chenichy, Amaury of Beisan, Hugh of Gibelet and William of Rivet baillis of Cyprus without Alice's consent before departing for Italy in May 1229. Duke Peter I of Brittany declared that he wanted to marry Alice, but Pope Gregory refused this on 29 May because of consanguinity.

=== Claims ===
In autumn 1229, Alice arrived in Acre, whereupon she laid claim to the Kingdom of Jerusalem against the infant Conrad, son and successor of Isabella II. She appeared before the High Court of Jerusalem declaring that Conrad had forfeited his right to the kingdom as he had failed to personally take possession of it within a year and a day of the death of his mother, as required by a local law regarding fiefs inherited by a non-resident heir. The members of the High Court, who had recently pledged fealty to Conrad's father, rejected Alice's claim, emphasizing that Conrad was a minor. However, they sent their envoys to Frederick in Foggia, Italy, requesting that he send Conrad to the Holy Land within a year and a day. Frederick informed the envoys in May 1230 that he would do what he thought best.

When her son reached the age of majority on 3 May 1232, Alice abdicated from her regency, which she had retained despite having left Cyprus. She went to France to personally advance her claim for Champagne and Brie in 1233, but only one local nobleman, Renier II of Nogent, supported her. Theobald IV of Champagne later captured the fortress of Nogent and confiscated Renier's estates.

At Theobald's request, Pope Gregory urged Alice to come to Rome, because the legitimacy of her parents' marriage was to be investigated. Alice refused to appear before the papal tribunal, but concluded a treaty with Theobald in September 1234, renouncing her claim to Champagne and Brie for 40,000 livres tournois and estates yielding a yearly income of 2,000 livres. In the agreement with Theobald, she also stated that she would not erect fortresses in her estates in Champagne.

Alice returned to the Holy Land in 1233. She probably renounced the County of Jaffa in favor of her son-in-law, Walter IV of Brienne, who married her daughter Mary in the same year, because Walter was styled Count of Jaffa from there on. Alice (who was about 46) married Ralph of Soissons, a man in his twenties who had come to the Holy Land during her cousin Theobald's crusade.

== Kingdom of Jerusalem ==
In 1242, the citizens of Tyre offered the barons opposed to Frederick's rule in the Kingdom of Jerusalem (Balian of Ibelin, Lord of Beirut, and Philip of Montfort, Lord of Toron) their assistance against Richard Filangieri, who ruled Tyre on Frederick's behalf. Marsilio Zorzi, the bailli of the Venetian community in the Holy Land offered naval support to the coalition. Conrad reached the age of majority on 25 April 1243. The members of the High Court approached Philip of Novara, a noted jurist, for a legal opinion, and he concluded that Frederick could no longer administer the Kingdom of Jerusalem on his son's behalf. Philip of Novara also argued that Alice and her husband were entitled to rule the kingdom as regents for the absent Conrad because she was his closest relative who lived in the Holy Land. The members of the High Court, the representatives of the clergy, the Military Orders and the Italian communities held a joint assembly where Alice and Ralph were proclaimed regents on 5 June. She agreed that Balian of Ibelin and Philip of Montfort would keep all royal castles in the kingdom.

Frederick's troops were expelled from Tyre in mid-July. Ralph sought to retain control of the town, but Balian of Ibelin and Philip of Montfort rejected him. The pair also refused to transfer Acre to Ralph and Alice, causing Ralph to depart the Holy Land in anger, stating that he was only a "shadow" ruler in the kingdom. Frederick refused to acknowledge Alice as regent and sent Thomas of Acerra to administer the kingdom on Conrad's behalf, but Thomas was prevented from landing in the kingdom, instead disembarking in the County of Tripoli.

The Kingdom of Jerusalem became a "sort of feudal republic" administered by the most powerful barons. Alice nonetheless exercised royal prerogatives: she annulled grants and appointments that Frederick had made after the death of Isabella II, and she gave Philip of Novara a money-fief of 1,000 bezants. Despite these exercises of royal power, she also stated before Marsilio Zorzi, who demanded the confirmation of the rights of the Venetian commune in Tyre, that she could not restore rights that had been withdrawn by a monarch because "she was not the lawful ruler of the kingdom". When Alice died in 1246, her son Henry succeeded her as regent of the Kingdom of Jerusalem although her younger half-sister Melisende also claimed the regency.

== Sources ==
- Edbury, Peter W. (1994) [1991]. The Kingdom of Cyprus and the Crusades, 1191–1374. Cambridge University Press. ISBN 978-0-521-45837-5.
- Evergates, Theodore (2007). The Aristocracy in the County of Champagne, 1100–1300. The Middle Ages. University of Pennsylvania Press. ISBN 978-0-8122-4019-1.
- Hamilton, Bernard (2016). "Queen Alice of Cyprus". In Boas, Adrian J. (ed.). The Crusader World. The Routledge Worlds. The University of Wisconsin Press. pp. 225–240. ISBN 978-0-415-82494-1.
- Hardwicke, Mary Nickerson (1969) [1962]. "The Crusader States, 1192–1243". In Setton, Kenneth M.; Wolff, Robert Lee; Hazard, Harry (eds.). The Later Crusades, 1189–1311. A History of the Crusades. Vol. II (Second ed.). The University of Wisconsin Press. pp. 522–554. ISBN 978-0-299-04844-0.
- Lock, Peter (2006). The Routledge Companion to the Crusades. Routledge Companions to History. Routledge. ISBN 978-0-415-39312-6.
- Runciman, Steven (1989) [1954]. The Kingdom of Acre and the Later Crusades. A History of the Crusades. Vol. III. Cambridge University Press. ISBN 978-0-521-06163-6.

Royal titles
Preceded by Isabella I of Jerusalem	Queen consort of Cyprus c. 1210–1218	Succeeded by Alice of Montferrat
Regnal titles
Vacant Title last held by Aimery of Lusignan	Countess of Jaffa; 1210–1233	Succeeded by Walter of Brienne
