= Queen Stephanie =

Queen Stephanie or Queen Estefania may refer to:

- Stephanie, Queen of Navarre, wife of King García Sánchez III of Navarre
- Stephanie of Lampron, wife of Henry I de Lusignan, King of Cyprus
- Stephanie of Hohenzollern-Sigmaringen (1837–1859), wife of King Peter V of Portugal
