= Aimery Barlais =

Baron in the kingdom of Cyprus, born in Jaffa

Aimery Barlais (died before June 1253) was a baron in the Kingdom of Cyprus, born in Jaffa. He was a son of Renaud Barlais, bailli of Jaffa –in 1197 under Aimery of Cyprus– and Isabelle of Bethsan.

== Biography ==
At an early age, Aimery moved to Cyprus, where he rose to become one of the kingdom's leading barons, and one of the opponents of the dominant Ibelin family. In 1227, he was appointed by Queen Alice, then living in voluntary exile, to be the ruling bailli of her underage son, King Henry I. This appointment was rejected by the island's haute cour, which instead appointed Henry's regent, Philip of Ibelin. Aimery joined Alice in exile in Tripoli, but made contact through his aide Gavin of Chenichy with Emperor Frederick II, who was preparing for the Sixth Crusade.

In July 1228, Frederick II landed in Cyprus and temporarily ended the government of John of Ibelin, the Old Lord of Beirut. He then set up a five-member regency council consisting of Aimery, Gavin of Chenichy, Amalric of Bethsan, Hugo of Gibelet and Wilhelm of Rivet. On 3 September 1228, Frederick departed for Acre, taking Henry I and John of Ibelin with him. He was to sell the bailliage of Cyprus to Aimery Barlais and his four colleagues, collecting revenue for three years.

The Emperor left for Italy on 1 May 1229, at the conclusion of the Sixth Crusade. Ibelin responded with military force, defeating the imperial council in a battle outside Nicosia on 14 July 1229, thus beginning the War of the Lombards. Aimery fled with the young king and his sisters to Dieu d'Amour Castle, where he withstood a siege for a year, surrendering in the summer of 1230. The victorious Ibelin forced Aimery to give up his reign in Cyprus, supported by the Haute Cour and the King.

In February 1232, Aimery was forced to take part in Ibelin's campaign against the imperial governor in the Kingdom of Jerusalem, Richard Filangieri. As soon as the Cypriot army went ashore near Tripoli, he withdrew with a few companions and allied himself with Filangieri. While Ibelin and his supporters were busy fighting on the mainland, Aimery received an army from Filangieri with which he wreaked havoc over defenseless Cyprus and conquered multiple castle. After the victory at Casal Imbert on 2 May 1232, Filangieri also crossed Cyprus to complete the conquest of the island. But only a month later, the Ibelins returned to the island with the help of the Genoese and on 15 June 1232, they were victorious over Filangieri in the Battle of Agridi. Aimery and his comrades-in-arms, were forced to flee from Cyprus again, this time to Cilician Armenia. In April 1233, Kyrenia, the last castle in Cyprus to be held by the imperial family, fell.

== Family ==
Aimery was married to Agnes of Marqab (died after 1239), daughter of Bertrand, lord of Marqab, with whom he had five sons and a daughter, Philippa. Philippa Barlais married Guy of Ibelin, constable of Cyprus and son of John of Ibelin, around 1240. The second-born son may have been William Barlais, Lord of Beirut.

== Bibliography ==
- Abulafia, David (1992). Frederick II: A Medieval Emperor. Oxford University Press. ISBN 019508040-8.
- Edbury, Peter W. (1997). John of Ibelin and the Kingdom of Jerusalem. Boydell Press. ISBN 978-0851157030.
- Furber, Elizabeth Chapin (1969). The Kingdom of Cyprus, 1191–1291 (PDF). A History of the Crusades (Setton), Volume II. Archived from the original (PDF) on 2023-03-26.
- Giles, Keith R. (1987). "The Emperor Frederick II's Crusade, 1215 – c. 1231" (PDF). Asian Journal of Pharmaceutical Sciences. 5 (4). Ph.D Dissertation, Keele University.
- Hardwicke, Mary Nickerson (1969). The Crusader States, 1192–1243 (PDF). A History of the Crusades (Setton), Volume II. Archived from the original (PDF) on 2024-03-28.
- La Monte, John L. (1937). "John d'Ibelin: The Old Lord of Beiruit, 1177-1236". Byzantion. 12 (1/2). Byzantion, Volume 12, No. 1/2, Peeters Publishers, pp. 417–448: 417–448. JSTOR 44169728.
- Lock, Peter (2006). The Routledge Companion to the Crusades. Routledge. doi:10.4324/9780203389638. ISBN 0-415-39312-4.
- Murray, Alan V. (2006). The Crusades—An Encyclopedia. ABC-CLIO. ISBN 978-1-57607-862-4. Archived from the original on 2023-03-26.
- Runciman, Steven (1954). A History of the Crusades, Volume Three: The Kingdom of Acre and the Later Crusades. Cambridge University Press. ISBN 978-0521347723.
- Setton, Kenneth M. (1969). A History of the Crusades. Six Volumes. University of Wisconsin Press.
- Tyerman, Christopher (2006). God's War: A New History of the Crusades. Belknap Press. ISBN 978-0-674-02387-1.
- Van Cleve, Thomas C. (1969). The Crusade of Frederick II (PDF). A History of the Crusades (Setton), Volume II. Archived from the original (PDF) on 2021-03-04.
- Van Cleve, Thomas C. (1972). The Emperor Frederick II of Hohenstaufen, Immutator Mundi. Clarendon Press, London. ISBN 019822513X.
- Weiler, Björn K. U. (2006a). Frederick II of Germany. The Crusades––An Encyclopedia, pp. 475–477.
- Weiler, Björn K. U. (2006b). Crusade of Emperor Frederick II (1227–1229). The Crusades––An Encyclopedia, pp. 313–315.
- Wolff, Robert Lee (1969). The Latin Empire of Constantinople, 1204-1312 (PDF). A History of the Crusades (Setton), Volume II. Archived from the original (PDF) on 2023-03-26.
