= James of Ibelin =

James of Ibelin (French: Jacques d'Ibelin; died in 1276) was count of Jaffa and, titularly, of Ascalon too as well as a noted jurist in the Kingdom of Jerusalem.

James was the son of Count John of Jaffa and Ascalon, himself a noted jurist in the crusader kingdom. John had urged King Henry I of Cyprus to send his army to defend the Kingdom of Jerusalem, where John and many Cypriot knights held land, from the Mamluks. The fortress of Ascalon was lost to the Muslim Mamluk Sultanate in 1247. John, who also held valuable estates in the Kingdom of Cyprus, died in 1266. Jaffa was conquered by the Mamluks in 1268.

In 1271, James advocated for the knights of Cyprus in their dispute with King Hugh III, who had ascended the thrones of Cyprus and Jerusalem in 1267 and 1268 respectively. In their deposition to the English prince Edward Longshanks, who acted as arbiter, the knights insisted that they did not owe military service to the king on the mainland. Unlike John decades earlier, James and the knights had no vested interest in fighting on the mainland because most of their possessions there had been lost. James's effort failed, but he demonstrated his family's pride in his speech, saying: "The men of the kingdom of Cyprus have more often served the house of Ibelin outside the kingdom than they have the king or his ancestors." James thus became the first member of the Ibelin family to challenge the power of the Lusignan kings of Jerusalem and Cyprus.

James dictated a law treatise on his deathbed in 1276.

== Sources ==
- Edbury, Peter W. (1991). The Kingdom of Cyprus and the Crusades, 1191–1374. Cambridge University Press.
- Edbury, Peter W. (2003), John of Ibelin: Le Livre Des Assises, Brill, ISBN 90-04-13179-5
