= Walter IV of Brienne =

13th-century French nobleman

Coat of arms of the Counts of Brienne

Walter IV (French: Gauthier (1205–before 1251) was the count of Brienne from 1205 to 1246, and of Jaffa and Ascalon. He was captured in the Battle of Forbie and tortured at the walls

== Life ==
Walter was the son of Walter III of Brienne and Elvira of Sicily.

While a teenager, Walter was sent to Outremer where his uncle John of Brienne was the ruler of Jerusalem. In 1235 John gave him the County of Jaffa and Ascalon, (Note: Edbury states that Walter of Brienne may have gained Jaffa as part of his wife's dowry.) that and arranged a marriage with Maria (before March, 1215 – ca. 1252 or 1254), daughter of Hugh I of Cyprus, in 1233. It is unknown how Walter came to become count of Jaffa and one theory is that Jaffa was given to him as a dowry by Henry I of Cyprus for marrying Marie.

Even after his uncle had been forced out of the kingdom by Frederick II, Walter remained one of the most important lords of the Kingdom of Jerusalem. He participated in the Crusade of Theobald I of Navarre in 1239 and was among the many French Crusaders captured by the Ayyubids. He was commander of the Crusader army that marched against the forces of as-Salih Ayyub at the Battle of La Forbie in 1244. Against the advice of al-Mansur of Homs, his Syrian ally, Walter insisted on taking the offensive, rather than fortifying his camp and awaiting the retreat of the Khwarezmians. In this disastrous battle, the Crusader-Syrian forces were nearly annihilated. Walter was captured, tortured before the walls of Jaffa, and ultimately turned over to the Egyptians after the Khwarezmian defeat before Homs in 1244. He was imprisoned in Cairo and murdered by merchants whose caravans he had robbed. He died at a later point in an Egyptian prison. His bones were returned to Acre for burial in 1251.

== Works cited ==
=== Books ===
- Edbury, Peter W. (1999). Kingdoms of the Crusaders: From Jerusalem to Cyprus. Ashgate Publishing Company.
- Hamilton, Bernard (2016). "Queen Alice of Cyprus". In Boas, Adrian (ed.). The Crusader World. Routledge.
- Paul, Nicholas L.; Schenk, Jochen G. (2017). "Family Memory and the Crusades". In Cassidy-Welch, Megan (ed.). Remembering the Crusades and Crusading. Routledge.
- Perry, Guy (2018). The Briennes: The Rise and Fall of a Champenois Dynasty in the Age of the Crusades, c. 950-1356. Cambridge University Press.

=== Journals ===
- Mayer, Hans (1984). "John of Jaffa, His Opponents, and His Fiefs". Proceedings of the American Philosophical Society. 128 (2). University of Pennsylvania Press: 134–163. doi:10.2307/986227. JSTOR 986227.

French nobility
Preceded by Walter III	Count of Brienne; 1205–1244	Succeeded by John
Vacant Royal domain Title last held by Alice of Champagne	Count of Jaffa; 1221-1244	Succeeded by John of Ibelin
