= Hugh of Fagiano =

Archbishop of Nicosia (1251–1267)

Hugh of Fagiano (Italian: Ugo di Fagiano) (died 1267) was a Latin prelate who served as the archbishop of Nicosia in the Kingdom of Cyprus from 1251 until his death. Originally a Praemonstratensian monk, he became the most forceful of the 13th-century archbishops of Nicosia. Throughout his term, Hugh was engaged in disputes with Latin and Greek Orthodox clergy, nobles, and secular authorities. He was particularly insistent on the subordination of the Greek bishops to the Latin bishops, in which he was successful. He went into exile due to disputes with King Henry I, a conflict with his own parishioners and Latin religious orders, and finally because he refused to accept Pope Alexander IV's concessions to the Greek archbishop of Cyprus, Germanos I. He was thus absent from Cyprus from 1261, but continued to involve himself in its affairs until at least 1264.

== Early career ==
Hugh was an Italian who arrived in the Kingdom of Cyprus in 1248 with the crusaders of King Louis IX of France. That same year he entered the monastic vocation when he joined the Praemonstratensian abbey of Bellapais. His ecclesiastical career within the Latin Church then progressed rapidly. In December 1250, Pope Innocent IV exempted Hugh from any ecclesiastical penalties such as interdict, suspension, or excommunication by papal legates, and forbidding his summons outside Cyprus unless the pope himself commanded it. Hugh expected to spend the rest of his life at Bellapais as a canon regular.

In 1251, Hugh was elected by the chapter of the Cathedral of Saint Sophia, in accordance with the Church canon, to succeed Eustorge of Montaigu as archbishop of Nicosia. Hugh was the first archbishop of Nicosia from a religious order. He retained close links with the Bellapais monastery.

== Archiepiscopacy ==
=== Conflicts with clergy and state ===
Hugh got into conflicts with virtually everyone in the kingdom: the Latin regular and secular clergy, the Greek Orthodox clergy, the nobles, and the crown. He was resolute in his beliefs and uncompromising in his morality. At the time of his election, Pope Innocent IV was negotiating a settlement with the Greek Orthodox bishops of Cyprus. The Greeks were gaining autonomy from the Latins and were to be directly subject to the pope; Hugh was determined to contest this, and this may be why the chapter of Nicosia elected him. He refused to acknowledge an Orthodox archbishop of Cyprus. The Orthodox bishops elected Germanos I to be their archbishop, which the Latins decried as uncannonical because they had been excommunicated; it was probably Hugh who pronounced that sentence. When Germanos excommunicated some Latins and refused Hugh's request to lift the sentence, Hugh excommunicated him too.

In 1252, Hugh had a dispute with his chapter about the tricenary benefices instituted by his predecessor, Archbishop Eustorge, which Hugh sought to abolish; the outcome of this dispute, which the bishops of Paphos and Limassol were ordered by the Pope to judge, is not known. In January 1253, he condemned the greed of the Latin clergy of Cyprus and imposed three-month suspensions, double restitution, and a ban on acting as trustees or executors without his approval. In 1253, Innocent granted his nephew, Opizo dei Fieschi, Latin patriarch of Antioch, tithes from the churches of Antioch and Cyprus for a period of three years for the purpose of fortifying the patriarch's castle at Qusair against Muslim attacks, but Hugh refused to contribute. The archbishop of Mamistra, who had been appointed to collect this tax, excommunicated him for this.

A dispute with King Henry I escalated to the point that Hugh left the kingdom and placed it under an interdict. In 1253, Pope Innocent granted the administration and revenues of the see of Nicosia to Opizo dei Fieschi, believing that Hugh intended to resign. When the Pope learned that he was mistaken in his presumption, Opizo was granted the administration of the see of Limassol instead. Hugh returned to Cyprus after King Henry's death in 1253 or possibly 1254, expecting to have a freer hand now that the kingdom was ruled by a woman, Queen Plaisance. For unknown reasons, he excommunicated all of his suffragans and subordinates; in 1254 Innocent absolved the bishop of Limassol from this sentence. The same year, Hugh quarreled with the Franciscans, who sold their house in Nicosia to the Cistercians; according to the rules of their order, any land they left was to revert to the diocesan bishop.

Innocent's death in late 1254 allowed Hugh to renew hostilities against the Cypriot Orthodox. The next pope, Alexander IV, favored the Latins and ordered the Greek bishops to obey Hugh. Thus emboldened, Hugh summoned Germanos to respond to certain allegations about the administration of his see. Germanos refused because he considered Hugh to be his equal and went to Rome with his suffragans to appeal to the Pope, Hugh continued to attack Germanos's men even after Germanos placed his Church under the protection of the Holy See. He expelled Germanos's deputies by force and dissuaded the Orthodox clergy from submitting to Germanos's authority, according to the Orthodox, "by various oppressions and damages and ecclesiastical sentences". Queen Plaisance too proved uncooperative, and Hugh complained to Pope Alexander that she refused to defend him and even had him "despoiled of all his ecclesiastical and worldly goods" at the urging of his enemies.

=== Conflicts with parishioners ===
In 1252–1257, frustrated by the allegedly pagan ritual of flute playing and hiring women to wail at funerals, Hugh decreed that, "if from this point on these [singing women] should go against our prohibition, we shall have them captured, beaten, put on the rack and then thrown into prison until they learn from the instruction of punishment how much they have transgressed." At one point he was overthrown by his own parishioners with the help of local Franciscans and Dominicans; he was besieged in his house for several days and nights and eventually left the island in secret and did not return for a long time. (Note: This incident is reported in an undated papal letter, probably by Urban IV (r. 1261–1264). The exile thereby described is either his first or an otherwise unknown second exile distinct from his final departure from the island.)

In 1257, likely responding to Pope Alexander's call to curb abuses in his diocese, Archbishop Hugh issued decrees publicly read in the Cathedral of Saint Sophia. He condemned moneylending as a cancer in Cyprus, excommunicated those involved–including scribes, notaries, agents, witnesses, and likely Latin clergy–and declared their contracts void. He also ordered that Mass be attended at Saint Sophia rather than in private or monastic chapels, stating that the cathedral must not be allowed to "suffer from a lack of respect on feast days or on holy days" or become "abandoned like a hut in the desert".

=== Final exile ===
In the case of the archbishop of Mamistra's excommunication of Hugh, Pope Alexander IV declared that "like has no power over like" and ordered the Latin patriarch of Jerusalem and the archdeacon of Acre to revoke the sentence in October 1259. Alexander's Bulla Cypria subordinated the Orthodox Church of Cyprus to the Latin Church, but allowed Germanos to remain archbishop of Cyprus for life, fully exempt from Hugh's authority. This was a victory for the Latins, but Hugh could not tolerate any concessions. Disgusted by the Pope's decision, Hugh left Cyprus in 1260. He retained his see and an interest in the affairs of the Latin Church in Cyprus, but was not able to maintain discipline from afar.

After Queen Plaisance's death in September 1261, the government of the kingdom passed to Hugh of Antioch. In 1264, Archbishop Hugh personally went to complain to the new pope, Urban IV, that Hugh of Antioch prevented him from enforcing the Bulla Cypria and reserved the right to punish lay people for their transgressions. The archbishop is not known to have involved himself in Cypriot affairs after 1264. He died in 1267 and was succeeded by Giles of Amigny.

Hugh was a "masterful prelate", the most forceful and contentious of the 13th-century archbishops of Nicosia. His final departure from Cyprus set the precedent for absenteeism among the highest clergy of the kingdom, which became an issue for the Latin Church by the early fourteenth century.

== Notes ==
Catholic Church titles
Preceded by Eustorge of Montaigu	Archbishop of Nicosia; 1251–1267	Succeeded by Giles of Amigny
