= Alice of Montferrat =

Queen consort of Cyprus

Queen consort of Cyprus
- Reign: 1229–1232
- Died: c. 1232
- Burial: Cathedral of Saint Sophia
- Spouse: Henry I of Cyprus
- House: Aleramici
- Father: William VI, Marquis of Montferrat
- Mother: Berta of Clavesana

Alice of Montferrat (French: Alix, Italian: Alasia; died c. 1232) was a Lombard noblewoman who was the queen of Cyprus by marriage to King Henry I from 1229 until her death.

Alice was the daughter of William VI of Montferrat and Berta of Clavesana, from Piedmont in the Holy Roman Empire. It is not known when she was born. Her father was one of the most loyal vassals of Emperor Frederick II, and the House of Montferrat was closely associated with both the Hohenstaufen emperors and the Lusignan kings of Cyprus.

Emperor Frederick chose Alice to be the bride of the young King Henry. Alice's royal match was a sign of the reconciliation of Frederick and her brother, Boniface II of Montferrat. Alice and Henry were married by proxy in 1229, and she was escorted to Cyprus by Frederick's supporters. Frederick regarded himself as the suzerain of the Kingdom of Cyprus but was opposed by the nobility headed by the House of Ibelin. The War of the Lombards ensued. Once in Cyprus, Alice was crowned queen. Henry, then aged 12, was too young for the marriage to be consummated.

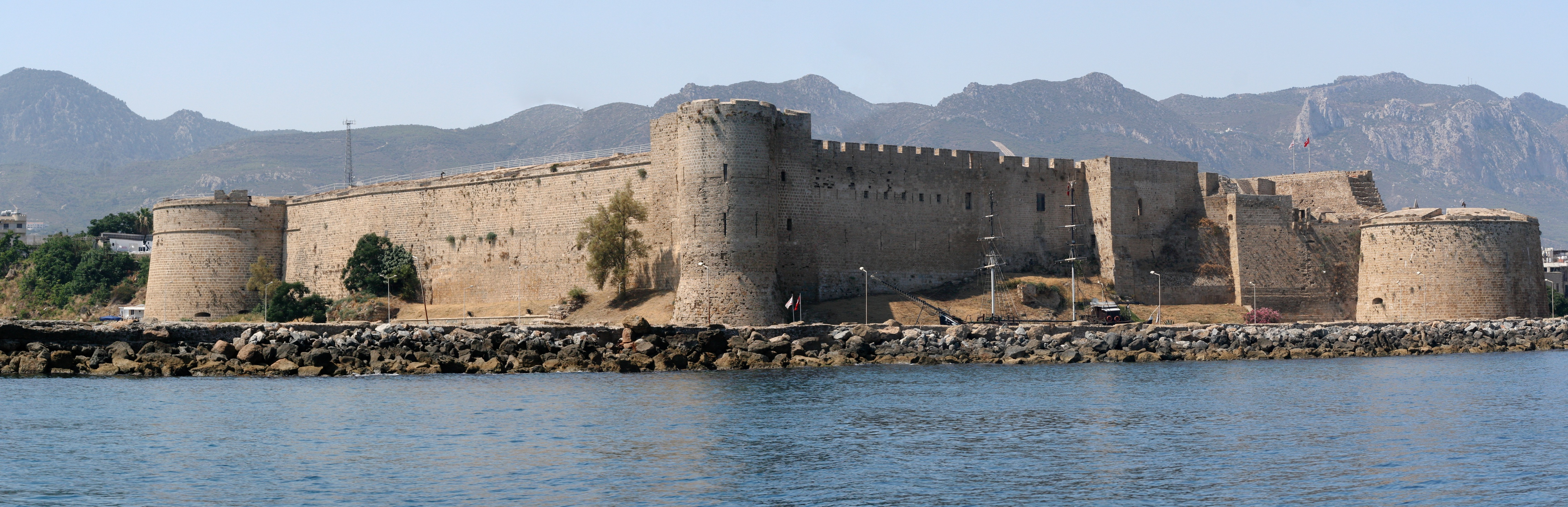
Fortress of Kyrenia

Alice was in Kyrenia with the Lombard faction when the Ibelins laid a 10-month-long siege, while Henry joined the besiegers. Loyal to Frederick's cause, Alice was in Kyrenia voluntarily. She became ill during the siege and died between 1231 and early 1232. Fighting was interrupted so that her corpse could be ceremoniously handed over to Henry for royal burial. She was interred in the Cathedral of Saint Sophia by the archbishop of Nicosia, Eustorgius of Montaigu. Henry had never seen her alive, and the diplomatic relations between the houses of Montferrat and Lusignan lapsed.

== Sources ==
- Edbury, Peter W. (1994). The Kingdom of Cyprus and the Crusades. Cambridge University Press. ISBN 978-0-521-45837-5.
- Haberstumpf, Walter (1995). Dinastie europee nel Mediterraneo orientale: i Monferrato e i Savoia nei secoli XII-XV (in Italian). Scriptorium. ISBN 8886231253.
- Runciman, Steven (1989). A History of the Crusades, Volume III: The Kingdom of Acre and the Later Crusades. Cambridge University Press. ISBN 0-521-06163-6.

Royal titles
| Vacant Title last held by Alice of Champagne | Queen consort of Cyprus; 1229–1232 | Vacant Title next held by Stephanie of Lampron |
