= Mary of Lusignan, Countess of Brienne =

Mary of Lusignan
- Countess of Brienne
- Born: Before March 1215; Cyprus
- Died: 5 July 1251 or 1253; Cyprus
- Spouse: Walter IV of Brienne
- Issue: John, Count of Brienne; Hugh, Count of Brienne; Amaury of Brienne
- House: Lusignan
- Father: Hugh I of Cyprus
- Mother: Alice of Champagne
- Religion: Roman Catholic

Mary of Lusignan (French: Marie de Lusignan; before March 1215 – 5 July 1251 or 1253), was the wife of Count Walter IV of Brienne and Countess of Brienne from the time of her marriage in 1233 to her husband's death while Crusading in 1244. Mary's parents were King Hugh I of Cyprus and Alice of Champagne, making her a maternal granddaughter of Queen Isabella I of Jerusalem. Her two surviving sons were John, Count of Brienne, and Hugh of Brienne.

== Biography ==
Mary was born sometime before March 1215, the eldest daughter and child of King Hugh I of Cyprus and Alice of Champagne. She had a younger sister, Isabella, and a brother, Henry, who, succeeded their father as king upon his death in January 1218.

Before 21 July 1229, Mary was betrothed to Duke Peter I of Brittany, whose wife Alix of Thouars had died in 1221; however, the Pope prohibited the match due to their fourth degree consanguinity.

By 1233, Mary had married Count Walter IV of Brienne. The marriage had been arranged by his uncle John of Brienne. From the time of her marriage, she became the countess of Brienne. Her husband was also the count of Jaffa and Ascalon.

Mary became a widow in October 1244 after Walter was murdered in Cairo. He had been taken prisoner following the Crusader-Syrian defeat at the Battle of La Forbie where he had led the Crusader army against the Egyptian forces. Their eldest son, John, succeeded him as count. Mary remained at the Cypriot court and died on 5 July in 1251 or 1253.

In 1267, after the death of King Hugh II, Mary's only surviving son Hugh claimed the Cypriot kingdom for himself, but was passed over by the High Court of Jerusalem in favour of her younger sister Isabella's son, Hugh of Antioch.

== Issue ==
Mary and Walter had three children:

- John, count of Brienne (c. 1235 – 1260/1261)
- Hugh, count of Brienne and Lecce (c. 1240 – 9 August 1296)
- Amalric

== Sources ==
- Edbury, Peter W. (1994). The Kingdom of Cyprus and the Crusades, 1191-1374. Cambridge University Press.
- Perry, Guy (2018). The Briennes: The Rise and Fall of a Champenois Dynasty in the Age of the Crusades, c. 950-1356. Cambridge University Press.
