= Guy of Ibelin (died 1304) =

Crusader from the Kingdom of Jerusalem

Guy

titular count of Jaffa and Ascalon
- Reign: 1276 - 1304
- Predecessor: John (jurist)
- Successor: Philip (his son)
- Born: 1250/1255
- Died: 1304
- Noble family: House of Ibelin-Jaffa
- Spouses: Maria of Ibelin, Lady of Ascalon and Naumachia
- Issue: Philip, Count of Jaffa; John; Maria, wife of Hugh IV of Cyprus; Hugh, Seneschal of Jerusalem; Balian
- Father: John of Ibelin (jurist)
- Mother: Maria of Barbaron

Guy of Ibelin (French: Guy d'Ibelin) (1250/1255 – 1304), of the Ibelin family, was count of Jaffa and Ascalon during the latter part of the Crusades. He was the son of John of Ibelin (a.k.a. John of Jaffa) and Maria of Barbaron. He was count in name only. His father, John of Jaffa, had died in 1266, after which the fragile truce with the Muslims collapsed, and Jaffa was captured by Baibars in 1268. John was probably succeeded by Guy's older brother James, who held the title of Count of Jaffa until his death in 1276, at which point the title passed to Guy.

In 1299/1300, Guy was able to capture Byblos with a Genoese fleet, but held it only briefly as it was recaptured by the Mamluks shortly after. He also met with the Mongol leader Kutlushah in 1301, in an unsuccessful attempt to coordinate a military attack against the Mamluks. In 1302 he and his family were captured by pirates while staying at their ancestral fiefdom in Episcopia, Cyprus.

He died on 14 February 1304 and was buried in Nicosia, Cyprus, in a pauper's grave in accordance with his vows. Guy must have been held in high regard on the island, judging from the turmoil following his death reported by the chronicler Amadi.

== Family ==
Guy married twice. His second wife was Maria, Lady of Ascalon and Naumachia, daughter of Philip of Ibelin and Simone de Montbeliard. Guy and Maria had five children:

- Philip (born before 1293, died 1315/1316 in Kyrenia), Count of Jaffa
- John (died 1315/1316 in Kyrenia)
- Maria (b. 1294, died before 1318), first wife of the man who later became Hugh IV of Cyprus in 1324
- Hugh (b. 1295/1300, died before 10 May 1349), Count of Jaffa, and then Seneschal of Jerusalem. Second husband of Isabella of Ibelin, widow of Infante don Fernando de Mallorca and daughter of Philip of Ibelin, Seneschal of Cyprus, and his second wife Maria of Giblet.
- Balian (b. 1298/1300), married Joan of Montfort, daughter of Rupen of Montfort
