= Stephanie of Lampron =

Queen consort of Cyprus
- Reign: 1237–1249
- Born: c. 1220/1225
- Died: After 1 April 1249
- Burial: Santa Sophia, Nicosia
- Spouse: Henry I of Cyprus
- House: Hethumids
- Father: Constantine of Baberon
- Mother: Stephanie of Barbaron

Stephanie of Lampron (c. 1220/1225 – soon after April 1, 1249, buried at Santa Sophia, Nicosia), was a queen consort of Cyprus, wife of King Henry I of Cyprus.

She was the daughter of Constantine, lord of Lampron and regent of Armenia, and Stephanie of Barbaron. She was the sister of Sempad the Constable. She married at Nicosia in 1237/1238, and had no issue.

Royal titles
Preceded by Alix of Montferrat	Queen consort of Cyprus; 1237–1249	Succeeded by Plaisance of Antioch
