= John, Count of Brienne =

French noble (c. 1235 – c. 1260)

John, Count of Brienne (c. 1235 – c. 1260) was the eldest son of Walter IV of Brienne and Marie of Cyprus.

He inherited the County of Brienne on his father's passing in 1246, but preferred to live among his mother's relatives at the court of Cyprus, and played little part in international politics. In 1255, he married Marie, Lady of Thieusies (in Hainaut), the daughter of Sohier II of Enghien. His wife and he had no children, and when he died, he was succeeded by his brother Hugh.

French nobility
Preceded by Walter IV	Count of Brienne; 1246–c. 1260	Succeeded by Hugh
