= Henry I of Cyprus =

King of Cyprus from 1218 to 1253

Henry I
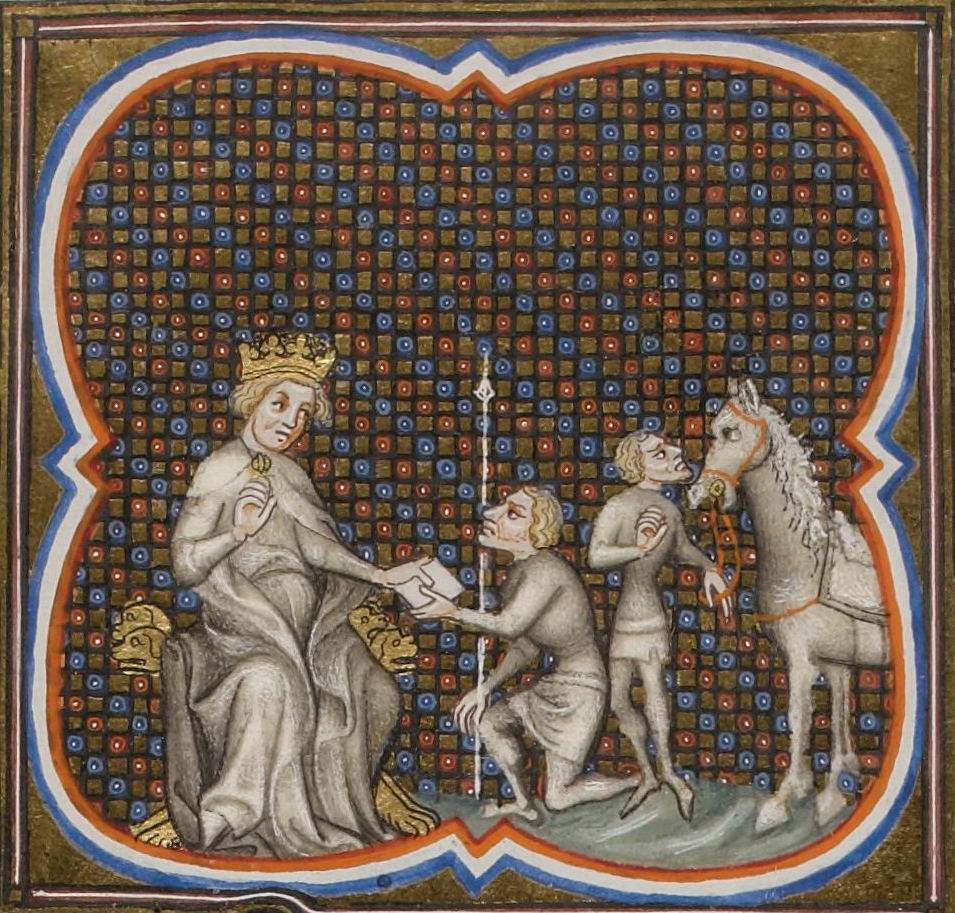
- Miniature of Henry receiving a message in a 1375–1380 edition of the Grandes Chroniques de France

King of Cyprus
- Reign: 10 January 1218 – 18 January 1253 (Note: In the Middle Ages, the year commonly began on 25 March, and this practice was followed in the Kingdom of Cyprus as well. A charter issued by Henry is dated October 1253; Hans E. Mayer suggested that the date was wrongly transcribed and should read 1252. Immediately after mentioning Henry's death, Amadi records that Archbishop Hugh returned after the king's death; Hugh was in Cyprus in June 1253, but away in March 1254. The historian Peter W. Edbury concludes that "having Henry die a year later than is generally supposed is in itself of no particular significance.")
- Predecessor: Hugh I
- Successor: Hugh II
- Born: 3 May 1217; Nicosia, Kingdom of Cyprus
- Died: 18 January 1253 (aged 35); Nicosia, Kingdom of Cyprus
- Spouses: Alix of Montferrat; Stephanie of Lampron; Plaisance of Antioch
- Issue: Hugh II of Cyprus
- House: House of Lusignan
- Father: Hugh I of Cyprus
- Mother: Alice of Champagne

Henry I (French: Henri; 3 May 1217 – 18 January 1253), called the Fat, was the king of Cyprus from 1218 until his death. Noted for his obesity, Henry was a pliant king who relied heavily on his kin from the powerful Ibelin family.

Henry was the son of King Hugh I, whom he succeeded as an infant. His mother, Alice of Champagne, held the regency during his minority, but her uncles Philip and John of Ibelin wielded power. Emperor Frederick II also claimed the right to rule Cyprus during Henry's minority, leading to a long war with the Ibelins, which dominated the first part of Henry's reign. The Ibelins prevailed and retained a leading role after Henry reached the age of majority in 1232.

In 1246, Henry succeeded his mother as regent of the Kingdom of Jerusalem in the name of his kinsman King Conrad II. He appointed John of Ibelin's son Balian to rule the mainland state in his name. In 1248 he sailed with King Louis IX of France to Egypt on the Seventh Crusade, but returned to Cyprus shortly after, leaving his men to serve under Louis. He died in 1253 and was succeeded by his infant son, Hugh II.

== Minority ==
=== Infancy ===
Henry was born on 3 May 1217 to Hugh I of Cyprus and Alice of Champagne. He had two sisters, Maria and Isabella. His mother, Queen Alice, was the aunt and heir presumptive to Isabella II of Jerusalem. King Hugh died on 10 January 1218 and the 8-month-old Henry succeeded him with Alice as his regent and guardian. Alice appointed her uncle Philip of Ibelin to govern the Kingdom of Cyprus as her bailli (lieutenant). The kingdom had been established by Hugh's father, Aimery of Lusignan (r. 1196–1205), who accepted the suzerainty of Emperor Henry VI in return for a crown.

During Henry's minority, Duke Leopold VI of Austria laid claim to the kingdom. Leopold was a second cousin once removed of the last Byzantine ruler of Cyprus, Isaac Komnenos, and must have tried to displace Henry in 1217–1219, while participating in the Fifth Crusade. The barons thwarted Leopold's attempt. Philip's brother, John, lord of Beirut, credited himself and his family with preserving the island for Henry.

Henry's kinship with the rulers of the Latin East

Amalric of Jerusalem	Maria Komnene	Balian of Ibelin	Baldwin of Ibelin	Richelda of Bethsan
Aimery of Cyprus	Eschiva of Ibelin
Conrad of Montferrat	Isabella I of Jerusalem	Henry II of Champagne	John of Ibelin	Philip of Ibelin	Margaret of Ibelin
Maria of Montferrat	Melisende of Cyprus	Burgundia of Cyprus	John of Ibelin	John of Caesarea
Alice of Champagne	Hugh I of Cyprus
Isabella II of Jerusalem	Frederick II of Germany	Eschiva of Montbéliard	Balian of Ibelin	Baldwin of Ibelin	Guy of Ibelin
Henry I of Cyprus	Maria of Cyprus	Isabella of Cyprus
Conrad II of Jerusalem

=== Conflicts over regency ===
==== Imperial claims ====
By 1223 or 1224, relations between Alice and Philip had broken down and the Queen left for Syria. In an attempt to get rid of her uncle, she married Bohemond of Antioch and possibly tried to pass the government to him. Philip of Novara, an Ibelin partisan, relates that the barons of Cyprus unanimously rejected Bohemond out of fear for Henry's safety. Alice then appointed Aimery Barlais, but Aimery was not able to dislodge Philip.

Another claimant to the rule over Cyprus during Henry's minority was Holy Roman Emperor Frederick II, who considered himself Henry's suzerain on the basis of King Aimery's fealty to Emperor Henry VI. Frederick married Queen Isabella II of Jerusalem on 9 November 1225 and planned to come to the Latin East on a crusade. Fearing that Frederick might seize the regency of Cyprus, the Ibelins decided to expedite Henry's coronation. In 1225, the archbishop of Nicosia, Eustorge of Montaigu crowned Henry king of Cyprus at the Cathedral of Saint Sophia. Frederick was enraged about not having received prior notification. In early 1226, Pope Honorius III instructed Philip to govern to the benefit of King Henry and the kingdom. He also ordered the military orders and people of Cyprus to be loyal to Henry and Philip and placed Henry under papal protection. After Philip died in 1127 or 1128, his brother John, lord of Beirut, seized power.

Empress Isabella died in 1228 after giving birth to her successor, Conrad II. The widowed Emperor Frederick set out for the Latin East nonetheless and arrived in Cyprus in July 1228. At the Emperor's request, John joined Frederick at a banquet in Limassol and brought his sons and King Henry. John and Frederick argued at the banquet, and John soon took up armed resistance. In September the men agreed that Queen Alice was the rightful regent, that the Emperor should have the profits from the royal revenues, that the fortresses should nominally be under the King's control and in the custody of his vassals until he came of age, and the Emperor took the fealty of the Cypriots as the kingdom's suzerain. Henry was left in Frederick's hands. A plot was hatched to kidnap King Henry and desert Frederick, but John refused to sanction it.

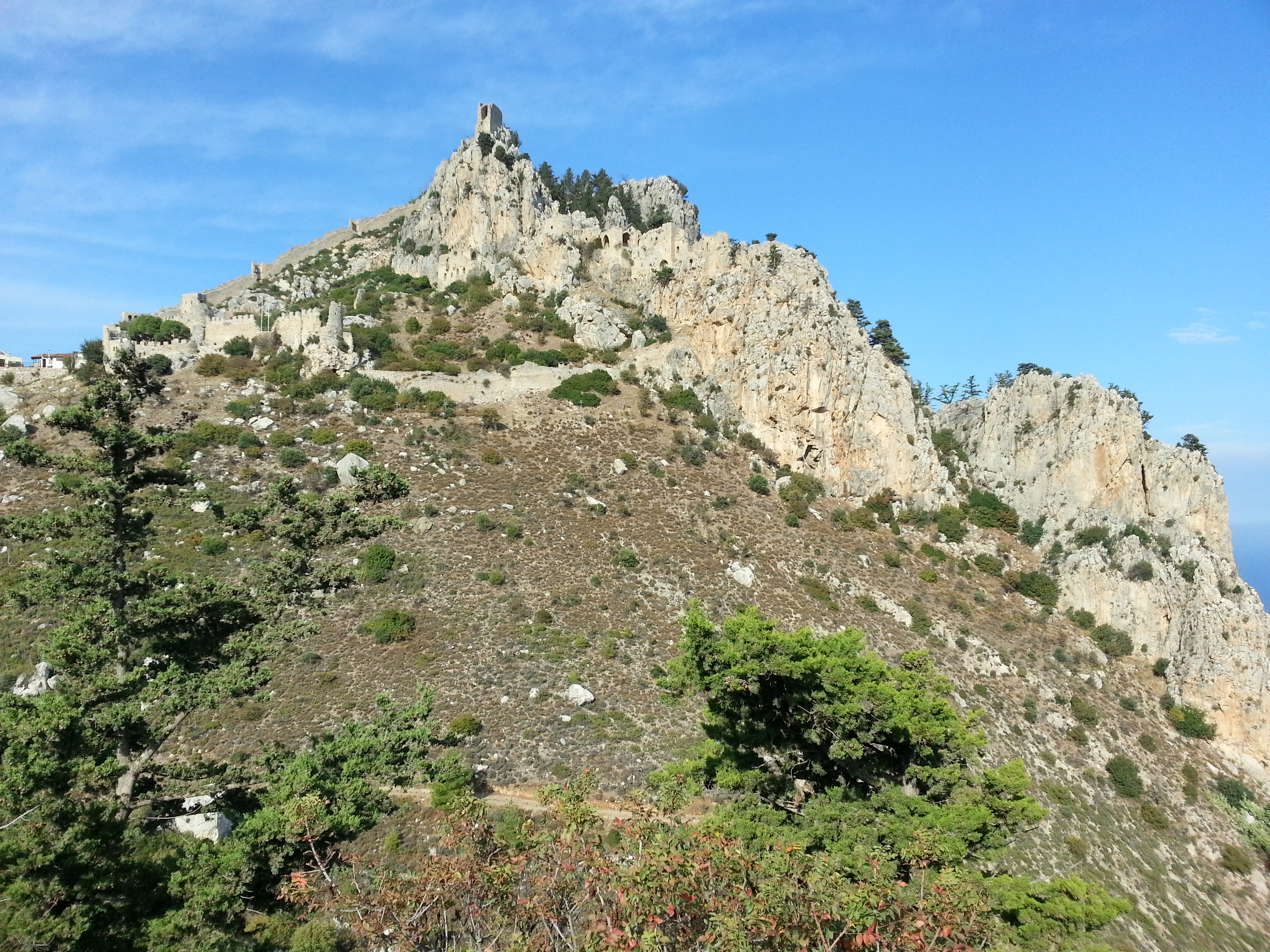
The young King Henry was kept at Dieudamour, which underwent a long siege in 1229–1230.

When in 1229 Frederick decided to return to Europe, he took Henry to Limassol and had him married by proxy to Alice of Montferrat, a daughter of the Emperor's kinsman and vassal William VI of Montferrat. The Emperor then handed over Henry to his supporters in Cyprus and named Aimery Barlais, Amalric of Bethsan, Hugh of Jubail, William of Rivet and Gauvain of Cheneche—leaders of the opposition to the Ibelins—as co-baillis. In June 1229 the Emperor was back in Italy. With the emperor gone, the baillis invited Philip of Novara—according to Philip's testimony—to King Henry's court and tried to tempt him into abandoning the Ibelin party while the young king looked at him helplessly. An armed conflict followed. The baillis sent the King under guard to Dieudamour before being defeated by the Ibelins at Nicosia in July. They retired to the castles of Dieudamour, Kyrenia, and Kantara, which the Ibelins promptly besieged. Kyrenia was taken swiftly, but the siege of Dieudamour lasted for nearly a year, starving the defenders. John of Ibelin feared that the baillis might smuggle the King away to Italy. Dieudamour capitulated in April or May 1230. A peace was then concluded and the baillis handed over the fortresses, the King and his sisters.

==== Imperialist rule ====
In late 1231, Emperor Frederick sent a great host to Cyprus. John of Ibelin was warned, and he took Henry to Kiti. The first detachment of the imperial host anchored off Cape Gata and demanded an audience with the King; when told that he was at Kiti, the Emperor's messengers sailed there. They relayed to Henry a message from the Emperor, who requested that the King banish the Ibelins. Henry took counsel with his advisors and responded, through his vassal William Visconte, that the Emperor's command was astonishing because John was his granduncle and vassal. Richard Filangieri then arrived with the rest of the imperial forces and attacked John's lordship of Beirut in the Kingdom of Jerusalem. John appealed to King Henry and his fellow vassals for help at a meeting of the High Court of Cyprus in Nicosia, and they all agreed.

Unable to lift the siege of Beirut, John of Ibelin negotiated the marriage of Henry's sister Isabella with Henry, the youngest son of Prince Bohemond IV of Antioch. In 1232, King Henry sent John's son Balian, William Visconte, and Philip of Novara to conclude this alliance. The Imperialists overran Cyprus and seized all fortresses except Dieudamour and Buffavento, which was defended by the king's cousin Eschiva of Montbéliard. John allied with the Genoese and decided to attack Filangieri at Tyre. After news reached him that his son Balian had raised the siege of Beirut, John decided to go to Acre to make peace. He left the King at Casal Imbert with his sons Baldwin, Hugh, and Guy; his namesake nephew; and Anselm of Brie. The Imperialists surprised them at night and defeated them. Henry escaped to Acre riding under guard almost naked. There he recruited men by offering fiefs and took out loans from John of Caesarea and the younger John of Ibelin. The King and the lord of Beirut took their small force to Cyprus, defeated the Imperialists in battle, and proceeded to retake the fortresses.

== Personal rule ==
=== Domestic affairs ===
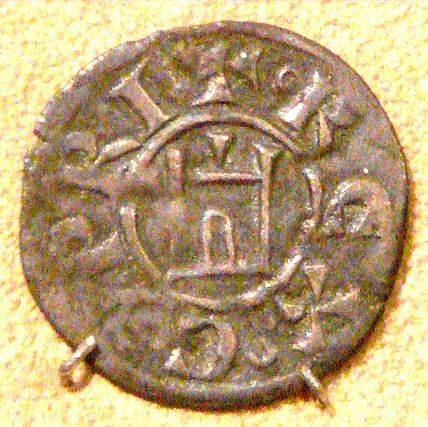
Silver denier of King Henry I

Henry reached the age of majority on 3 May 1232. Frederick was thus deprived of his principal justification for intervening in the affairs of Cyprus, but he may have continued to regard Henry as a minor because in Germany the age of majority was 25. On 10 June Henry rewarded the Genoese with momentous concessions: legal autonomy in Cyprus, trade exemptions, houses and bakeries in major towns, and the casale of Despoire near Limassol. The King and the Ibelins won a decisive battle at Agridi on 15 June.

Henry's wife, Queen Alice, who was on the side of the Imperialists, died of an illness while he and the Ibelins were besieging Kyrenia in the winter of 1232/1233. A truce was arranged for the Queen's body to be delivered to the King and buried. The couple may have met; they could not have seen each other since the Ibelins took custody of the King in April or May 1230. Henry's elder sister, Maria, married Count Walter IV of Brienne in 1233. Henry generously bestowed lands on his brothers-in-law, Walter of Brienne and Henry of Antioch.

After the definite restoration of the Ibelin party to power, Henry accused the Imperialist barons of treason at the High Court. All who had waged war against him after he reached majority—a list headed by Aimery Barlais, Amaury of Bethsan, Hugh of Jubail, and Philip Chenard—had their fiefs confiscated and granted to the King's supporters. With the surrender of Kyrenia in April 1233, the War of the Lombards ended in Cyprus. The last engagements of the conflict drained Henry's treasury. Vassals who had not received payment since the rule of the King's mother, Queen Alice, complained at a session of the High Court, but Henry's granduncle John of Ibelin convinced them that the requisite formalities for the case were not observed and they apologized to the King. Tithes were also owed, and Henry had to compensate the archbishop of Nicosia with royal lands.

John of Ibelin died in 1236. He had enjoyed the King's confidence. His son Balian succeeded him as lord of Beirut and King Henry's counsellor. Henry was not an assertive king. He was noted chiefly for his obesity, which earned him the nickname "the Fat". The Ibelins led Henry's council and the High Court, but appear to have had no differences with him. In 1237 or 1238, Henry cemented the continuously good relations with the Armenian Kingdom of Cilicia by marrying Stephanie of Lampron, a half-sister of King Hethum I.

=== Lordship of Jerusalem ===
Henry's mother was elected regent of the Kingdom of Jerusalem in 1243, in place of the absent King Conrad. Henry ignored the appeals to relieve the city of Jerusalem in 1244 when the Khwarazmian army besieged it. When his mother died in 1246, both Henry and her half-sister Melisende of Cyprus claimed the regency. Although his aunt was more closely related to Conrad, the High Court awarded the regency to Henry. The reasoning is unrecorded, but he was likely preferred as a male and an anointed monarch, and evidence suggests he also secured support by distributing land to court members. Perhaps in an effort to win the regency, Henry appointed Guy and Baldwin, sons of John of Ibelin, as constable and seneschal of Cyprus respectively in the 1240s.

Conrad was still technically king of Jerusalem, but Henry ruled the mainland kingdom as "lord of Jerusalem". Henry appointed Balian of Ibelin as his bailli and granted the lordship of Tyre to Philip of Montfort. After Balian's death in 1247, his brother John became bailli. Tiberias fell to the Khwarazmian army on 16 June 1247. When the Ayyubids laid a siege to Ascalon soon after, the Knights Hospitaller requested Henry's help. Although he sent eight ships, Ascalon fell in October.

=== Seventh Crusade ===
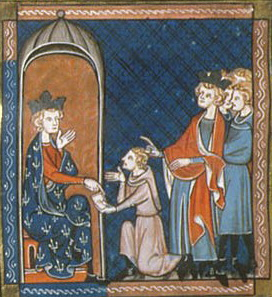
Henry welcomed Louis IX of France in Cyprus and accompanied him on crusade to Egypt.

In 1247 Pope Innocent IV formally released Henry from all oaths sworn to Frederick, permanently ending imperial claims to suzerainty over Cyprus. In September 1248, King Louis IX of France, his wife Margaret, and his brothers Counts Charles I of Anjou and Robert I of Artois arrived in Cyprus on their way to the Seventh Crusade. Henry and the Ibelins welcomed Louis. The French crusaders overwintered in Cyprus, the resources of which proved unable to support a great force, and many died of an epidemic. Henry's wife, Queen Stephanie, also fell ill. Henry and Louis set sail together from Limassol to Egypt. After accompanying Louis on his solemn entry into Damietta on 6 June 1249, Henry returned to Cyprus, leaving his force behind to serve under Louis for a year. The Egyptian campaign ended in a defeat in April 1250.

Archbishop Eustorge died in Egypt in April 1250. Henry quarreled with the new archbishop, Hugh of Fagiano, who left Cyprus and imposed an interdict on the kingdom. In September 1250, shortly after the death of Queen Stephanie, Henry married once again. His third wife, Plaisance, was the daughter of Prince Bohemond V of Antioch. She gave birth to Henry's only child, Hugh, and the King died a few months later in Nicosia. His death is generally dated to 18 January 1253 following the late medieval Italian Chronicle of Amadi; alternatively, it may have taken place in 1254. He was buried in a Templar church. He had appointed Guy of Ibelin, Philip of Novara, and Robert of Montgisard to be his executors. His son, King Hugh II, succeeded him under the regency of Queen Plaisance.

Throughout the 20 years of his personal rule, Henry appears to have never stood at the forefront of the Latin East's political scene. The historian George Francis Hill describes Henry as a "colourless personality" whose reign saw significant events in which he apparently played no leading part. He considers it significant that John of Joinville, who chronicled the Seventh Crusade, does not even mention him.

== Notes ==
Regnal titles
Preceded by Hugh I	King of Cyprus; 1218–1253	Succeeded by Hugh II
