= Conrad IV of Germany =

13th-century king of Germany, Sicily, and Jerusalem

Conrad IV
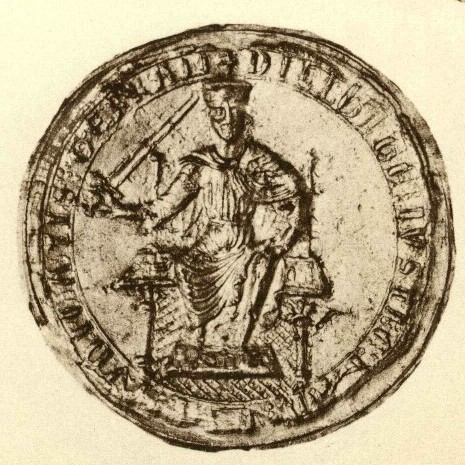
- Seal of Conrad IV

King of Germany (formally King of the Romans) King of Italy
- Reign: May 1237 – 21 May 1254
- Predecessor: Henry (VII)
- Successor: William

King of Sicily
- Reign: 13 December 1250 – 21 May 1254
- Predecessor: Frederick I
- Successor: Conrad II

King of Jerusalem
- Reign: 4 May 1228 – 21 May 1254 (with Frederick I until 1243) (Note: Taking advantage of the precedent established by John of Brienne back in c. 1212, Frederick retain the crown of Jerusalem during Conrad's minority.)
- Predecessor: Isabella II and Frederick I
- Successor: Conrad III
- Regents: Frederick II, Holy Roman Emperor (1228–1243); Alice, Queen of Cyprus (1243–1246); Henry I, King of Cyprus (1246–1253); Plaisance, Queen of Cyprus (1253–1254)

Duke of Swabia
- Reign: 12 February 1235 – 21 May 1254
- Predecessor: Henry
- Successor: Conrad IV
- Born: 25 April 1228; Andria, Kingdom of Sicily
- Died: 21 May 1254 (aged 26); Lavello, Kingdom of Sicily
- Burial: Messina Cathedral
- Spouse: Elisabeth of Bavaria
- Issue: Conradin
- House: Hohenstaufen
- Father: Frederick II, Holy Roman Emperor
- Mother: Isabella II of Jerusalem

Conrad (25 April 1228 – 21 May 1254), a member of the Hohenstaufen dynasty, was the only son of Emperor Frederick II from his second marriage with Queen Isabella II of Jerusalem. He inherited the title of King of Jerusalem (as Conrad II) upon the death of his mother in childbirth. Appointed Duke of Swabia in 1235, his father had him elected King of Germany (King of the Romans) and crowned King of Italy (as Conrad IV) in 1237. After the emperor was deposed and died in 1250, he ruled as King of Sicily (Conrad I) until his death.

== Early years ==
He was the second child, but only surviving son of Emperor Frederick II and Isabella II (Yolanda), the queen regnant of Jerusalem. Born in Andria, in the South Italian Kingdom of Sicily, his mother died shortly after giving birth to him and he succeeded her as monarch of the Crusader state of Jerusalem. By his father, Conrad was the grandson of the Hohenstaufen emperor Henry VI and great-grandson of Emperor Frederick Barbarossa. He lived in Southern Italy until 1235, when he first visited the Kingdom of Germany. During this period his kingdom of Jerusalem, ruled by his father as regent through proxies, was racked by civil war until Conrad declared his majority and his father's regency lost its validity.

In 1235, Conrad was betrothed to a daughter of Duke Otto II of Bavaria. She died before the marriage could take place, but Conrad later married her sister.

== Rise to power ==
When Emperor Frederick II deposed his eldest son, Conrad's rebellious half-brother King Henry (VII), Conrad succeeded him as duke of Swabia in 1235. However, the emperor was not able to have him elected King of the Romans until the 1237 Imperial Diet in Vienna. The electors were "the archbishops of Mentz [Mainz], of Treves [Trier], and of Cologne, the bishops of Bamberg, of Ratisbon [Regensburg], of Frisingen [Freising], and of Passau, the count palatine of the Rhine, the duke of Bavaria, the king of Bohemia, the landgrave of Thuringia, and the duke of Carinthia". This title, though not acknowledged by Pope Gregory IX, presumed his future as a Holy Roman emperor. Prince-Archbishop Siegfried III of Mainz, in his capacity as German archchancellor, acted as regent for the minor until 1242, when Frederick chose Landgrave Henry Raspe of Thuringia, and King Wenceslaus I of Bohemia to assume this function. Conrad intervened directly in German politics from around 1240. He led the short-lived anti-Mongol crusade of 1241.

However, when Pope Innocent IV excommunicated Frederick in 1245 and declared Conrad deposed, Henry Raspe supported the pope and was in turn elected as a rival king of Germany on 22 May 1246. Henry Raspe defeated Conrad in the battle on the Nidda in August 1246. Nevertheless, Henry Raspe’s wider support in Germany was weak and he died several months later. He was succeeded as a rival king by William of Holland.

Also in 1246, Conrad married Elisabeth, a daughter of Otto II of Bavaria. They had a son Conradin, in 1252. In 1250 Conrad temporarily settled the situation in Germany by defeating William of Holland and his Rhenish allies.

== Italian Campaign ==
When Frederick II died in 1250, he passed Sicily and Germany, as well as the title of King of Jerusalem, to Conrad, but the struggle with the pope continued. After reverses in Germany in 1251, Conrad decided to invade Italy, hoping to regain the rich dominions of his father, and where his half-brother Manfred was acting as regent. In January 1252 he invaded Apulia with a Venetian fleet, successfully managing to restrain Manfred and exercise control of the country. That same year Conrad issued constitutions during the hoftag in Foggia, which were based on the well-known examples from Norman and early Staufer times. After the death of Frederick II, riots began in parts of the kingdom of Sicily and several cities attempted to escape the royal control, forcing Conrad to take military action in order to suppress the revolts. In October 1253 his troops conquered Naples. Steadily, Conrad consolidated his position in the kingdom and the formidable centralized government fashioned by his father continued to function effectively. New historical sources have shown, Conrad tried to reconcile with the pope, but no agreement was reached.

The pope offered Sicily to Edmund Crouchback, son of Henry III of England, in 1253. Conrad was excommunicated on 9 April 1254. Nevertheless, Innocent’s support in central Italy was waning. Conrad mustered an army for a decisive assault on Rome but he died of malaria on 21 May 1254 at his army camp in Lavello, Basilicata. Manfred continued the struggle with the Papacy, but after achieving success, he was killed at the Battle of Benevento by Charles I of Anjou. Conrad’s son, Conradin, attempted to reclaim the kingdom of Sicily but was also defeated by Charles of Anjou at the Battle of Tagliacozzo and executed soon after.

Conrad's widow Elisabeth remarried to Meinhard II, Count of Tirol, who in 1286 became Duke of Carinthia.

Conrad's death in 1254 began the Interregnum, during which no single ruler managed to gain undisputed control of Germany. Notably, many princes took this opportunity to gain more influence with their vast wealth and relative stability as opposed to the fractured monarchy which had proven to be somewhat unreliable. Similarly, many nobles accumulated greater autonomy without the guidance of a king. The Interregnum ended in 1273, with the election of Rudolph of Habsburg as King of the Romans.

== See also ==
- Kings of Germany family tree. He was related to every other king of Germany.

== Notes ==
Conrad IV of Germany House of Hohenstaufen Born: 1228 Died: 1254
Regnal titles
Preceded by Isabella II; Frederick	King of Jerusalem; 1228–1254 with Frederick II (1228-1243)	Succeeded by Conradin
Preceded by Henry (VII); Frederick II	Duke of Swabia; 1235–1254	Succeeded by Conradin
Preceded by Henry (VII); Frederick II	King of Germany; 1237–1254 with Frederick II (1237-1250)	Succeeded by William as anti-king since 1247
Preceded by Henry (VII); Frederick II	King of Italy; 1237–1254 with Frederick II (1237-1250)	Succeeded by Henry VII
Preceded by Frederick	King of Sicily; 1250–1254	Succeeded by Conradin
