= County of Jaffa and Ascalon =

Vassal state of the Kingdom of Jerusalem

- 1100–1268
- Status: Vassal of Kingdom of Jerusalem
- Capital: Jaffa
- Common languages: Latin, Old French, Italian (also Arabic and Greek)
- Religion: Roman Catholicism, Eastern Catholicism, Greek Orthodoxy, Syriac Orthodoxy, Islam, Judaism
- Government: Feudal monarchy
- Count
  - c.1100: Roger and Gerard
  - 1266–1268: James of Ibelin
- Historical era: High Middle Ages
  - First Crusade: 1100
  - Conquered by Baibars: 1268
Preceded by	Succeeded by
Fatimid Caliphate	Mamluk Sultanate

The double County of Jaffa and Ascalon was one of the four major seigneuries comprising the major Crusader state of the Kingdom of Jerusalem, according to 13th-century commentator John of Ibelin.

== History ==
Jaffa was fortified by Godfrey of Bouillon after the First Crusade in 1100, and was unsuccessfully claimed by Daimbert of Pisa, the first Latin patriarch. It remained part of the royal domain until it was given to Hugh of Le Puiset in 1110. When Hugh II rebelled against King Fulk in 1134 the county was divided into a number of smaller holdings, and Jaffa itself became a royal domain. In 1151 it was designated as the apanage of King Baldwin III's younger brother, Amalric. After the siege of Ascalon in 1153, King Baldwin III conquered Ascalon, which was added to Amalric's territory.

Jaffa and Ascalon were then granted to close relatives of the monarch and passed in and out of direct royal control as its holders ascended the throne. Around 1250 it was given to a branch of the Ibelin family. With the capture of Jaffa by Baibars in 1268, the county became titular. It was bestowed anew upon John Perez Fabrice by James II of Cyprus and Jerusalem.

== Vassals ==
The County of Jaffa and Ascalon had a number of vassals of its own:

- Lordship of Ramla
- Lordship of Ibelin
- Lordship of Mirabel (technically separate from the above, but held by the Ibelins)

== Counts of Jaffa ==
- Hugh I (1110–1118), first cousin of king Baldwin II of Jerusalem
  - Albert of Namur (1118–1122), stepfather and regent to Hugh II
- Hugh II (1122–1134)

The county passed into royal domain upon confiscation from Hugh II.

- Amalric (1151–1153), granted Jaffa by his brother, King Baldwin III

== Counts of Jaffa and Ascalon ==
In 1153, Amalric was granted Ascalon as well, and from then on Jaffa and Ascalon were held by the same count.

- Amalric (1153–1163)

The county passed into royal domain upon Amalric's accession to the throne in 1163.

- Sibylla (1176–1186), granted county by her brother, King Baldwin IV, upon her marriage
  - William of Montferrat (1176–1177), first husband of Sibylla
  - Guy of Lusignan (1180–1186), second husband of Sibylla

The county passed into royal domain upon Sibylla's accession to the throne in 1186.

- Geoffrey of Lusignan (1191–1193), brother of Guy of Lusignan
- Aimery of Jerusalem (1193–1198)

The county passed into royal domain upon Aimery's accession to the throne in 1198.

- Walter IV of Brienne (1221–1244), nephew of John of Brienne and husband of Aimery's granddaughter Maria
- John of Ibelin (1244–1266), son of Philip of Ibelin, Isabella I's half-brother
- James of Ibelin, son of John (1266–1268)

=== Titular counts ===
- James of Ibelin (1268–1276)
- Guy of Ibelin (1276–1304)
- Hugh of Ibelin (1304–1349)
- Balian II of Ibelin (1349 – c. 1352)
- Guy of Ibelin (c. 1352 – c. 1353)
- Balian of Ibelin (c. 1353 – c. 1365)
- John of Ibelin (c. 1365 – c. 1367)
- Mary of Ibelin (with Regnier le Petit) (c. 1367)
- Florin (c. 1450) perh. the same as
- Jacques de Flory (d. 1463)
- John Perez Fabrice
- Louis Perez Fabrice
- Georges Contaren
- N. Contaren
- Georges Contaren II (c. 1579)

== See also ==
- Vassals of the Kingdom of Jerusalem

== Sources ==
- John L. La Monte, Feudal Monarchy in the Latin Kingdom of Jerusalem, 1100–1291. The Medieval Academy of America, 1932.
- Jonathan Riley-Smith, The Feudal Nobility and the Kingdom of Jerusalem, 1174–1277. The Macmillan Press, 1973.
- Steven Runciman, A History of the Crusades, Vol. II: The Kingdom of Jerusalem and the Frankish East, 1100–1187. Cambridge University Press, 1952.
- Steven Tibble, Monarchy and Lordships in the Latin Kingdom of Jerusalem, 1099–1291. Clarendon Press, 1989.
