= Hugh I of Cyprus =

King of Cyprus from 1205 to 1218

Hugh I
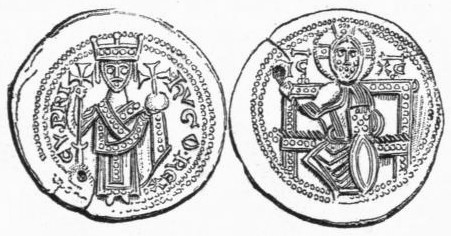
- Bezant of Hugh I

King of Cyprus
- Reign: 1 April 1205 – 10 January 1218
- Predecessor: Aimery
- Successor: Henry I
- Regent: Walter of Montbéliard (1205–1210)
- Born: 1195
- Died: 10 January 1218 (aged 22–23); Tripoli
- Burial: Church of the Hospitallers, Nicosia
- Spouse: Alice of Champagne
- Issue: Mary, Countess of Brienne; Isabella, Regent of Jerusalem; Henry I, King of Cyprus
- House: House of Lusignan
- Father: Aimery of Cyprus
- Mother: Eschiva of Ibelin

Hugh I (French: Hugues; Greek: Ούγος (Oúgos); 1195 – 10 January 1218) was the king of Cyprus from 1205 until his death. He was nine when he succeeded his father, King Aimery, and his brother-in-law Walter of Montbéliard ruled the kingdom as regent. Sometime between 1208 and 1211, Hugh married Alice of Champagne, with whom he had three children. After reaching the age of majority and assuming personal rule in 1210, he fell out with Walter, who fled to the Kingdom of Jerusalem. Hugh reversed Walter's policies, making peace with the Seljuqs of Rum and siding with the Armenians in the War of the Antiochene Succession. Pope Innocent III rebuked him for his hostility to the king of Jerusalem, John of Brienne, and for interfering in church appointments. Hugh embarked on the Fifth Crusade in late 1217, but died of an illness in Tripoli soon after. His infant son, Henry I, succeeded him under Queen Alice's tutelage.

== Early life ==
Hugh was born in 1195 to the lord of Cyprus, Aimery of Lusignan, and his first wife, Eschiva of Ibelin. He was named after his paternal grandfather, Hugh VIII of Lusignan. He had three sisters, of whom Burgundia and Helvis survived childhood, and two brothers, Guy and John. Eschiva was recuperating from an illness at the village of Paradhisi (just north of Salamis) when she and her children were abducted by the pirate Kanakes, who took them to Antiochetta as hostages. The ruler of Armenian Cilicia, Leo II, intervened and demanded their release. He arranged for them to be housed at the fortress of Corycus, where Aimery soon came to retrieve them. Eschiva died shortly after the family's release.

In 1197, Aimery struck an alliance with his hitherto enemy, Count Henry II of Champagne, who ruled the Kingdom of Jerusalem as the husband of Isabella I of Jerusalem. The men agreed that Aimery's sons—Guy, John, and Hugh—would marry Henry and Isabella's daughters—Margaret (or Maria), Alice, and Philippa—and that the girl who married the eldest boy would receive the County of Jaffa as her dowry. In September that year, Aimery was crowned king of Cyprus and Henry died in an accident. Aimery then married Henry's widow, Isabella, and was crowned king of Jerusalem in her right. Aimery and Isabella had a son, Amalric, and two daughters, Sibylla and Melisende. John, Guy, and Amalric died young. In c. 1202, Aimery had his eldest daughter, Burgundia, marry Walter of Montbéliard, a crusader from France, and made him constable of Jerusalem.

Hugh's kinship and affinity with the rulers of the Latin East

Amalric of Jerusalem	Maria Komnene	Balian of Ibelin	Baldwin of Ibelin	Richelda of Bethsan
John of Ibelin	Philip of Ibelin	Margaret of Ibelin m. Walter of Caesarea
Aimery of Cyprus	Eschiva of Ibelin
Conrad of Montferrat	Isabella I of Jerusalem	Henry II of Champagne
Maria of Montferrat m. John of Brienne	Alice of Champagne m. Hugh I of Cyprus	Philippa of Champagne m. Erard of Brienne-Ramerupt	Sibylla of Cyprus m. Leo II of Armenia	Melisende of Cyprus m. Bohemond IV of Antioch	Hugh I of Cyprus m. Alice of Champagne	Helvis of Cyprus m. Raymond-Roupen	Burgundia of Cyprus m. Walter of Montbéliard

== Reign ==
=== Regency and marriage ===
King Aimery died of food poisoning on 1 April 1205; Hugh, by then the king's only surviving son, was nine years old. The crowns of Jerusalem and Cyprus parted ways: Isabella died soon after Aimery, and her daughter Maria succeeded her in Jerusalem while Cyprus passed to Hugh. Hugh's heir presumptive was his elder sister, Burgundia. The High Court of Cyprus appointed her husband, Walter of Montbéliard, to rule Cyprus as regent. Walter also became Hugh's guardian. Walter was an energetic and ambitious regent; he launched an unsuccessful attempt to establish Cypriot rule in Satalia (now Antalya, Turkey), and arranged for Helvis, sister of Hugh and Burgundia, to marry his kinsman, Odo of Dampierre.

Hugh reached marriageable age upon turning thirteen in 1208. According to the marriage agreement King Aimery had made with Count Henry, Hugh was to marry Alice, the eldest surviving daughter of Count Henry and Queen Isabella. In 1206, at Walter's request, Pope Innocent III instructed the Latin patriarch of Jerusalem, Albert of Vercelli, to look into the agreement and judge whether implementing it would be beneficial to the Latin East. John and Philip of Ibelin were uncles and guardians of Henry's daughters, Alice and Philippa, and were also maternal kin of King Hugh. They agreed to the union and promised that, if Alice died before the marriage could be celebrated, the king could marry the younger sister, Philippa, instead. Alice was then the heir presumptive to the Kingdom of Jerusalem and had a strong claim to the County of Champagne. Walter probably pushed for the marriage because, if Alice's half-sister Queen Maria died childless, it would bring the Kingdom of Jerusalem under Hugh's rule. A papal dispensation was needed—and granted—because the marriage of Hugh's father to Alice's mother, concluded after Henry's death, made Hugh and Alice stepsiblings.

According to the historian George Francis Hill, Hugh married Alice in 1208. Hill's colleague Peter W. Edbury argues that this dating, though frequent, is "unwarranted", and that the Eracles is right in placing the marriage just before September 1210. The Gestes des Chiprois and the Annales de Terre Sainte date it to 1211.

=== Personal rule ===
==== Regime and policy changes ====
He was of middle stature, neither tall nor short, of goodly limbs and figure, but stooping slightly. His expression was coldly reserved; his complexion pale, his hair blond. He was very ready to undertake anything which concerned him and might turn to his honour. He was very fond of the company of knights and all kinds of men of arms. He was irascible and violent, but his anger soon passed. — Continuator of William of Tyre

Hugh reached the age of majority in September 1210 and his brother-in-law, Walter of Montbéliard, resigned regency. Hugh immediately called Walter to account, stating that Walter had kept him in a "state of deprivation". He demanded that Walter restore the treasure left by King Aimery, amounting to 200,000 white bezants, and repay the 40,000 bezants Hugh had been forced to borrow for his upkeep—funds he argued Walter should have provided during his minority. Instead of rendering an account, Walter and Burgundia left Cyprus with the assistance of the Knights Templar and Prince Bohemond IV of Antioch. Walter was given shelter by his cousin John of Brienne, who had just become king of Jerusalem, for which Hugh resented John. In a letter sent to Pope Innocent III, Walter complained that Hugh had expelled him from Cyprus and confiscated his property without the judgement of the High Court. Hugh was probably advised to act against Walter by the older nobility, including Walter III of Caesarea, Aimery of Rivet, Reynald of Soissons, and Walter of Bethsan, who attended Hugh at this time.

With Hugh I's assumption of personal rule, Walter's policies on Cypriot foreign relations were reversed. Hugh concluded a treaty with the Seljuqs of Rum which guaranteed that the merchants from Cyprus and Rum could safely run their business in both countries. South of Rum, Leo II of Cilicia and the Hospitallers waged a war against Bohemond IV and the Templars in support of Raymond-Roupen's claim on the Principality of Antioch. While Walter had supported Bohemond, Hugh stood with Leo and Raymond-Roupen. The king gave his 12-year-old half-sister, Sibylla, in marriage to the 60-year-old Leo when the latter arrived in Cyprus in 1210, and had his full sister Helvis marry Raymond-Roupen, prompting Odo of Dampierre to complain to the pope. Already at the beginning of his personal rule, Hugh established close relations with the Hospitallers, confirming and extending their privileges and property in Cyprus.

Hugh I was the first king of Cyprus to have coins minted in his name. His surviving coinage consists of white bezants and two types of denier. The deniers bearing the inscription Ugonis Re(gis) de Cipro are of inferior craftsmanship and may have been issued by Walter of Montbéliard in Hugh's name. The other deniers, possibly issued by Hugh after he came of age, are inscribed Hugo Rex Cypri.

==== Conflicts with Church and mainland ====
In 1211, Hugh chose Durand, treasurer of the archdiocese of Nicosia, to become the new archbishop of Nicosia, and the canons duly elected Durand. Royal involvement in episcopal selection was customary, but Walter denounced Durand to Pope Innocent III, who instructed Patriarch Albert to investigate. Innocent also urged Albert to reconcile Walter and Hugh, but the young king was not willing. Albert quashed the election of Durand on the grounds that secular powers should not interfere. Hugh saw this as Albert's capriciousness and sent the archdeacon of Famagusta to Rome to protest.

After Queen Maria of Jerusalem died in 1212, relations broke down between her widower, John, and her uncles John and Philip of Ibelin. Maria left a daughter, Isabella II, and King John's rule thus continued, though not without opposition from a part of the nobility. Hugh lent his support to the barons who challenged King John's authority and imprisoned John's relative (probably Walter's nephew Odo of Montbéliard) and some vassals, who had taken refuge in Cyprus after naval attacks by Muslims. Hugh I's politics are sparsely covered in historical sources. Presumably, he supported the rebels because he and his wife would have become regents for Isabella II if King John had stood down; they also stood to inherit the mainland kingdom in case the girl died. It is probably at this time that the Ibelins and other dissatisfied barons went to live in Cyprus. By 1217, they had become the highest-ranking witnesses to Hugh's acts.

Pope Innocent rebuked Hugh for his interference in Church matters and his acts against John of Brienne in early 1213, and ordered that the canons of Nicosia elect another archbishop, who would be approved by the patriarch of Jerusalem, the archbishop of Caesarea, and the bishop of Acre. Eustorge of Montaigu eventually rose to the see, but the king retained his customary right to nominate clergy.

==== Fifth Crusade ====
In 1215 or 1216, Pope Honorius III urged Hugh to make peace with King John and prepare his ships for the Fifth Crusade. The original plan was for the crusaders to assemble in Cyprus, and Honorius declared that Hugh and his family would be under apostolic protection. The crusaders started assembling in Syria instead in September 1217. King Hugh arrived with his constable, Walter of Caesarea; Archbishop Eustorge; his kinsmen John and Philip of Ibelin; and Walter and Gremont of Bethsan. Hugh took part in the siege of Mount Tabor, the failure of which was blamed—among others—on him, and one or two likewise unsuccessful expeditions.

Hugh and another crusade leader, King Andrew II of Hungary, had a disagreement with King John, and towards the end 1217, Andrew decided to return home. Hugh accompanied Andrew to Tripoli. At Tripoli, Hugh attended the wedding of his half-sister Melisende and Prince Bohemond IV of Antioch. During the festivities, Hugh became ill and died at Tripoli on 10 January 1218. He left two daughters, Maria and Isabella, and an infant son, Henry I, who succeeded him under Alice's tutelage. Hugh was buried in a Hospitaller church in Tripoli, presumably at his request. In 1223, his remains were transferred to a Hospitaller church in Nicosia.

== Sources ==
- Donnachie, Stephen (27 May 2021). "The predicaments of Aimery de Lusignan". Settlement and Crusade in the Thirteenth Century. London: Routledge. pp. 183–193. doi:10.4324/9780429203886-15. ISBN 978-0-429-20388-6.
- Edbury, Peter W. (1994). Kingdom of Cyprus and the Crusades. Cambridge University Press. ISBN 978-0-521-45837-5.
- Hamilton, Bernard (2016). "Queen Alice of Cyprus". In Boas, Adrian J. (ed.). The Crusader World. The Routledge Worlds. The University of Wisconsin Press. pp. 225–240. ISBN 978-0-415-82494-1.
- Hill, George Francis (2010). A History of Cyprus. Vol. 2. Cambridge University Press. ISBN 978-1-108-02063-3.
- Molin, Kristian (2006). "Hugh I of Cyprus". In Murray, Alan V. (ed.). The Crusades: An Encyclopedia. Vol. 607–608. ABC-CLIO. p. 24. ISBN 978-1-576-07862-4.
- Runciman, Steven (1952). A History of the Crusades: The Kingdom of Jerusalem and the Frankish East, 1100–1187. Vol. 2. Cambridge University Press. ISBN 0241298768.
- Runciman, Steven (1989). A History of the Crusades. Vol. III: The Kingdom of Acre and the Later Crusades. Cambridge University Press. ISBN 0-521-06163-6.

Regnal titles
Preceded by Aimery	King of Cyprus; 1205–1218	Succeeded by Henry I
