= Philip of Ibelin (1180–1227) =

Cypriot nobleman

Philip

regent of Cyprus
- Born: 1180
- Died: 1227 (aged 46–47)
- Noble family: House of Ibelin-Jaffa
- Spouse: Alice of Montbéliard
- Issue: Maria; John (jurist)
- Father: Balian of Ibelin
- Mother: Maria Komnene

Philip of Ibelin (1180–1227) was a leading nobleman of the Kingdom of Cyprus. As a younger son of Balian of Ibelin and the dowager queen Maria Komnene, he came from the high Crusader nobility of the Kingdom of Jerusalem.

== Life ==
Philip is first mentioned in 1206, when he and his older brother John of Ibelin, the Old Lord of Beirut accompanied their niece Alice (Note: Alice was the grand-daughter of their mother, Maria Kommene, by her first marriage) to Cyprus for her marriage to Hugh I of Cyprus. Both brothers moved their power base to the island permanently before 1217, probably after coming into conflict with King John of Jerusalem. In 1218, Hugh I of Cyprus died and Philip was made steward (regent) to Henry I of Cyprus during his minority – in this position he was instrumental in the house of Ibelin's rising dominance over the island.

== Marriage and issue ==
Philip married Alice of Montbéliard (died after 1244), a sister of Odo of Montbéliard. They had two children:

1. Maria of Ibelin († after 1244), became a nun, for whom in 1244 Alice funded the establishment of St Theodor monastery in Nicosia.
2. John of Ibelin († 1266), Count of Jaffa

== Bibliography ==
- Steven Runciman: A History of the Crusades. 1951.
- Kenneth M. Setton, Robert Lee Wolff, Harry W. Hazard: A History of the Crusades, Volume II. The Later Crusades, 1189-1311. 2006.
