= High Court of Jerusalem =

Feudal council of the Kingdom of Jerusalem

Coat of arms of the Kingdom of Jerusalem.

The High Court (French: Haute cour) was the feudal council of the Kingdom of Jerusalem. It was sometimes also called the curia generalis, the curia regis, or, rarely, the parlement.

== Composition of the court ==
The Haute Cour was a combination of legislative and judicial powers. It had its basis in medieval parliamentarian ideals: a sovereign desired the consent of his subjects in certain matters, such as taxation and obligations to conduct military service.

The court developed gradually during the early 12th century CE, along with the kingdom itself, in the aftermath of the First Crusade. Technically all vassals of the king who were subject to its decisions had the right to sit and vote, but in practice only the more wealthy nobles did so; certain nobles attended regularly and tended to serve as presiding judges when necessary. This developed into a system of higher nobles (direct vassals of the king) and lesser nobles (indirect vassals, who owed service to the higher nobles), with different privileges depending on idiosyncratic circumstances. Anyone who had committed perjury or had broken an oath (whether a higher or lesser noble) forfeited his right to speak and vote. Only four votes (the king and any three vassals) were required to form a quorum.

The court could meet wherever necessary, not solely in Jerusalem. After around 1120 the court also included bishops, and according to tradition new crusaders were entitled to sit and vote; the first time this occurred was the Council of Acre on 24 June 1148 during the Second Crusade, when the fatal decision to attack Damascus was made. Later the masters of the military orders were entitled to sit and vote as well. During the 12th century there was also a smaller group of advisors to the king, but by the end of the century this group had fallen out of use.

== Duties of the court ==
The court levied taxes on the inhabitants of the kingdom, and voted on military expeditions. A formal vote for war would mobilize all the vassals of the kingdom. The court was the only judicial body for the nobles of the kingdom, hearing cases of murder, rape, assault, wardship, debt, recovery of slaves, sales and purchases of fiefs and horses, default of service, inheritance, and treason. Punishments included forfeiture of land and exile, or in extreme cases, death. It was possible to escape punishment from the court by challenging all the appointed judges to a trial by combat and defeating them (but this was of course impractical and was never done). The court was also responsible for minting coins.

Most importantly, the court elected the king or his regent, or settled disputes between various claimants. Each new reign began with a meeting of the court, to formally recognize the new king and to swear an oath of homage to him. They also gave advice to the king and developed proper procedures for doing so, but in practise they could disagree with the king and override his wishes. Essentially, the king was only "first among equals" while sitting in the court, although he was recognized as its head (in the king's absence the court was presided over by his seneschal).

== Factions within the court ==
There tended to be two factions within the court, a so-called "court party," consisting of the royal family, the patriarch, and their supporters, and the "nobles' party", consisting of the higher nobility and the military orders. Disputes between the two factions were frequent. There was a major dispute during the co-reign of Melisende and her son Baldwin III, when Melisende refused to give up the crown after Baldwin came of age. Baldwin eventually gained the support of the nobility and was recognized as sole king. A second major dispute arose during the regency of Raymond III of Tripoli for the child-king Baldwin V, when the relative newcomer Guy of Lusignan was chosen by the court party over more experienced nobles. This decision would eventually lead to increased conflict with the Muslims and the fall of Jerusalem itself in 1187.

== The Assise sur la ligece ==
Perhaps the most important piece of legislation passed by the court was Amalric I's Assise sur la ligece. The Assise formally prohibited the illegal confiscation of fiefs and required all of the king's vassals to ally against any lord who did so. Such a lord would not be given a trial, but would instead be stripped of his land or exiled. It also made all nobles direct vassals of the king, eliminating the previous distinction between higher and lesser nobles. This distinction still existed in reality, and although lesser nobles now had an equal voice in the court, the more powerful barons refused to be tried by lesser lords who were not their peers. The higher nobles were still able to judge the less powerful lords themselves. There were about 600 men eligible to vote in the Court according to the Assise.

== The court in the 13th century ==
There was also a Cour des Bourgeois in the kingdom but in the 12th century the two do not seem to have met together. They began to do so in the 13th century when the capital of the kingdom had been moved to Acre, and the leaders of the merchant colonies in the coastal cities were also allowed to sit (but not vote). By this time central authority had eroded so much that the more powerful nobles often had their own courts.

Holy Roman Emperor Frederick II opposed the authority of the court while he was staying in Acre during the Fifth Crusade, and it was temporarily abolished from 1232 to 1244. In its place the Commune of Acre was set up, which invoked the Assise against him, although his army was much larger than any force the remnant of the kingdom could muster. The Commune, unlike the Court, included the burgesses. Meanwhile, the High Court of Cyprus adopted basically the same structure.

== Significance ==
Most of our information on the court comes from John of Ibelin's description of it, written in the 1260s. His description was an idealized explanation of the laws and procedures, based on the idea that Godfrey of Bouillon, the first king of Jerusalem, had personally established it and that it had remained unchanged since then (in the 13th century Godfrey was already a legendary figure). This was not the case, although it did develop much more slowly than similar contemporary courts elsewhere in Europe. Unlike France or England, the kingdom was not developing into a centralized parliamentary government – in fact it developed the opposite way, with the king losing more and more power to the barons. The court had essentially fossilized the feudalism of northern France circa 1100; because the kingdom was constantly at war, covered so little land, had so few westerners, and survived in Jerusalem for less than a hundred years, it did not have a chance to develop into a true Parliament.

John of Ibelin's description, while useful, was taken too literally by later historians. In the 19th century, the court was commonly held to be the purest representation of feudalism in all of the Middle Ages, although today this is considered too simplistic. The court was in some ways a fairly typical feudal court, but was adapted to the specific circumstances of the crusades and of the Kingdom of Jerusalem.

== See also ==
- Knesset
- Assizes of Jerusalem

== Sources ==
- Peter W. Edbury, John of Ibelin and the Kingdom of Jerusalem. Rochester, New York: 1997.
- John L. La Monte, Feudal Monarchy in the Latin Kingdom of Jerusalem, 1100-1291. Cambridge, Massachusetts: 1932.
- Prawer, Joshua (1972). The Latin Kingdom of Jerusalem: European Colonialism in the Middle Ages. London: Weidenfeld and Nicolson. ISBN 9780297993971.
