= Bailiff (France) =

French administrative representative during the ancien régime

A bailiff (French: bailli, pronounced [baji]) was the king's administrative representative during the ancien régime in northern France, where the bailiff was responsible for the application of justice and control of the administration and local finances in his bailiwick (baillage).

== Name ==
Bailli is first noted in the 12th century and comes the same word in Old French which means to govern or administer. One 17th Century author credits the Old French word as meaning at the time "guardian" or "protector." This word derives from the Vulgar Latin term bajulivus meaning "official in charge of a castle" (i.e., a royal castellan or "porter."

== History ==
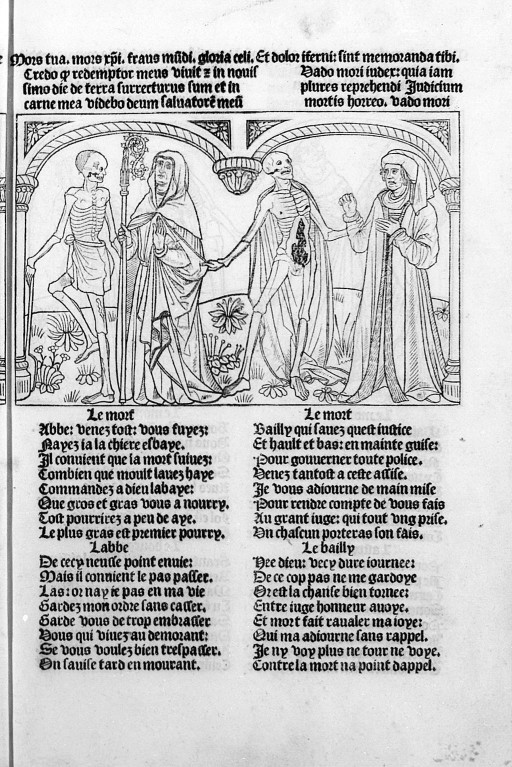
"The Bailiff" from Guyot Marchand's Danse Macabre (14th century): Death, who has summoned me Without right of appeal, casts down my joys. I see no more moves nor routes to take; Against Death there are no appeals.

In the late 12th and early 13th century, King Philip II, an able and ingenious administrator who founded the central institutions on which the French monarchy's system of power would be based, prepared the expansion of the royal demesne through his appointment of bailiffs in the king's northern lands (the domaine royal), based on medieval fiscal and tax divisions (the "baillie") which had been used by earlier sovereign princes such as the Duke of Normandy. In Flanders, the count appointed similar bailiffs (Dutch: baljuw). The equivalent agent in the king's southern lands acquired after the inheritance of the County of Toulouse was the seneschal.

Over time, the role of the baillages would be greatly extended as extensions of royal power, administration and justice. With the office of Great Seneschal vacant after 1191, the bailies became stationary and established themselves as powerful officials superior to provosts. A bailie's district included about half a dozen provostships. When appeals were instituted by the Crown, appeal of provost judgments, formerly impossible, now lay with the bailie. Moreover, in the 14th century, provosts no longer were in charge of collecting domainal revenues, except in farmed provostships, having instead yielded this responsibility to royal receivers (receveurs royaux). Raising local army contingents (ban and arrière-ban) also passed to bailies. Provosts therefore retained the sole function of inferior judges over vassals with original jurisdiction concurrent with bailies over claims against nobles and actions reserved for royal courts (cas royaux). This followed a precedent established in the chief feudal courts in the 13th and 14th centuries in which summary provostship suits were distinguished from solemn bailiary sessions.

Unlike the local administration of Norman England through sheriffs drawn from the great local families, the bailiff was a paid official sent out by the government, who had no power network in the area to which he had been assigned, and, in the way of a true bureaucrat, owed his income and social status wholly to the central administration that he represented. "He was therefore fanatically loyal to the king," Norman Cantor observes, "and was concerned only with the full exercise of royal power." The cathedral schools and the University of Paris provided the clerks and lawyers who served as the king's bailiff.

== See also ==
- Bailiff
- Vidame
