= Eschiva of Montbéliard =

Cypriot noblewoman (c. 1206-c. 1239)

Eschiva of Montbéliard (c. 1206 – c. 1239) was a Cypriot noblewoman. She was related to the reigning Lusignan dynasty and, by marriage, to the prominent Ibelin family of the Kingdom of Jerusalem. She inherited substantial lands in the Kingdom of Cyprus and was lady of Beirut in the Kingdom of Jerusalem. She defended Buffavento Castle in the War of the Lombards.

== Family ==
Eschiva was the daughter of Burgundia, daughter of King Aimery of Cyprus, and Walter of Montbéliard, who ruled the Kingdom of Cyprus as regent on behalf of Burgundia's brother King Hugh I. Walter and Burgundia fled Cyprus with their household in 1205 after Hugh reached the age of majority and demanded money from Walter. The family settled in the Kingdom of Jerusalem, ruled by Walter's cousin John of Brienne. Walter died in 1212 and Eschiva inherited substantial lands in Cyprus from him.

Eschiva's kinship with the rulers of the Latin East

Baldwin of Ibelin	Amalric of Jerusalem	Maria Komnene	Balian of Ibelin
Eschiva of Ibelin	Aimery of Cyprus	Isabella I of Jerusalem	John of Ibelin
Walter of Montbéliard	Burgundia of Cyprus	Hugh I of Cyprus	Alice of Champagne	Maria of Montferrat	John of Brienne	Balian of Ibelin
Eschiva of Montbéliard	Henry I of Cyprus	Frederick II of Germany	Isabella II of Jerusalem

Eschiva's properties made her a desirable bride. Her first husband was Gerard of Montaigu, nephew of the archbishop of Nicosia, Eustorge of Montaigu. They had a daughter, Alice (who married John of Caesarea). He was killed in the War of the Lombards in 1229. Roughly the next year, Eschiva contracted a clandestine marriage with Balian of Ibelin, to whom she was related within the prohibited degrees. The archbishop of Nicosia consequently excommunicated both Eschiva and Balian, but Balian intimidated him and a dispensation for their marriage was eventually granted. Eschiva and Balian's children were John, Hugh, and Isabella (wife of Henry I Embriaco).

== War ==
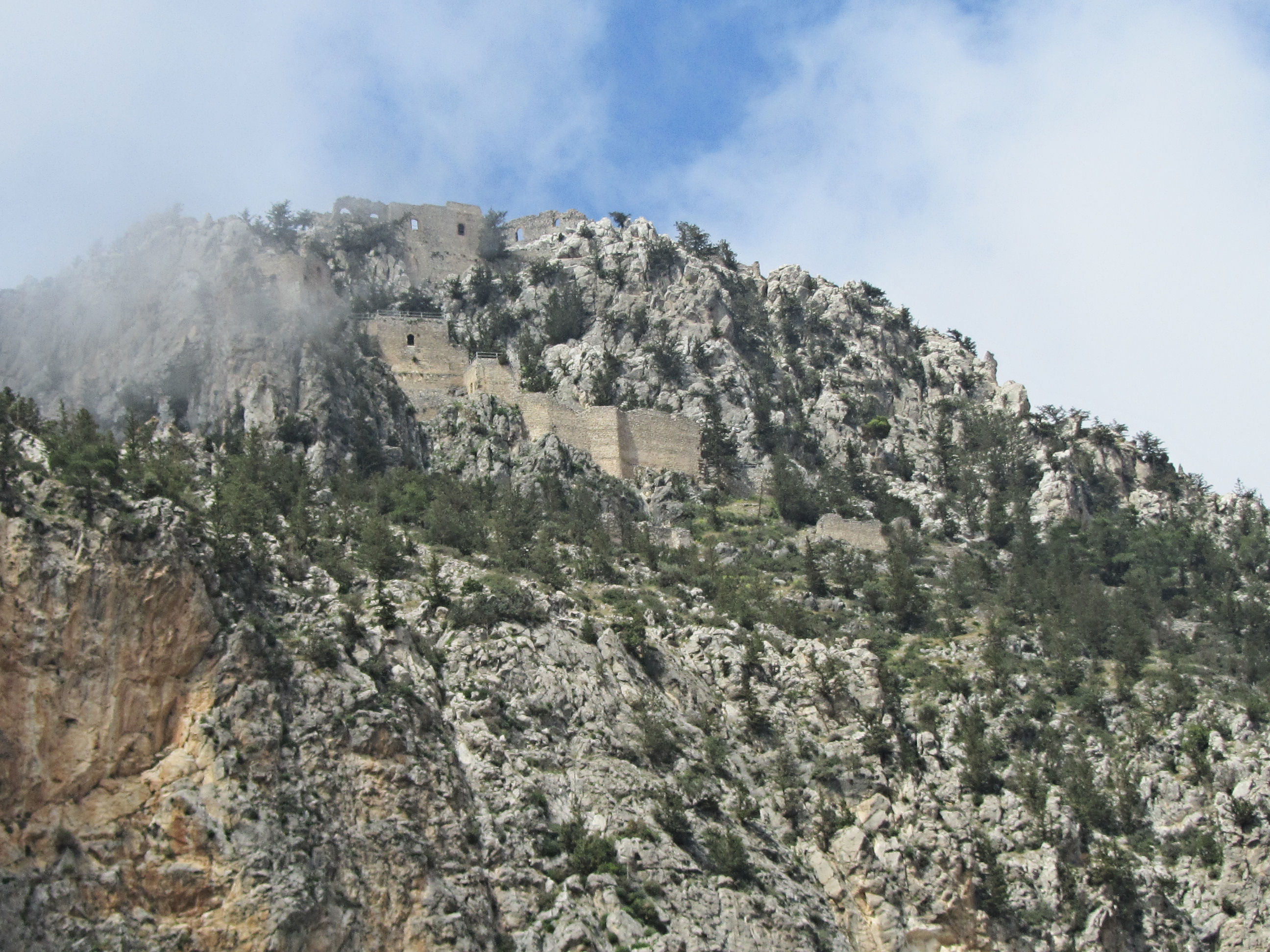
Eschiva held Bufavento for her cousin King Henry; it was one of only two castles in Cyprus not to surrender to the Imperialists.

The War of the Lombards saw the supporters of Emperor Frederick II wage a war against the House of Ibelin for control of Cyprus during the minority of King Hugh I's successor, King Henry I. In 1232, Frederick's army attacked the lordship of Beirut, the fief which Eschiva's father-in-law John of Ibelin held in the Kingdom of Jerusalem. When the Ibelin partisans left Cyprus to defend Beirut, the Imperialists seized the opportunity and overran the island, capturing all fortresses but Buffavento and Dieudamour. The kin of the Ibelin men fighting on the mainland scrambled for shelter: some in churches and monasteries, some in caves and mountains. Eschiva took her children to the Knights Hospitaller, and then left them and her fief to go to Buffavento. She arrived disguised as a Franciscan monk and found the fortress held for the king by an old knight, Guinart of Conches. Eschiva brought ample provisions to the fortress and defended it against the Imperialists.

John of Ibelin died in 1236. Balian, his eldest son and Eschiva's husband, became lord of Beirut. Eschiva was lady of Beirut. She died around 1239.
