= Alice de la Roche =

Medieval noblewoman, regent of the Lordship of Beirut from 1274 to 1277

- Lady of Beirut; Regent of Beirut
- Coat-of-arms de La Roche
- Born: Unknown
- Died: 1282
- Noble family: de la Roche
- Spouses: John II of Ibelin, Lord of Beirut
- Issue: Isabella of Ibelin; Eschive of Ibelin
- Father: Guy I de la Roche, Lord of Athens

Alice de la Roche (died 1282) was a Latin noblewoman who ruled the Lordship of Beirut in the Kingdom of Jerusalem as regent and was a claimant to the Duchy of Athens. She was a daughter of Duke Guy I de la Roche. Alice was regent of Beirut for her daughter, Lady Isabella, while Isabella was the queen consort of Cyprus.

== Family ==
Alice was born on an unknown date. She was one of six children of Guy I de la Roche, Lord of Athens (1205–1263), and his wife, an unnamed woman of the noble House of Villehardouin. Her paternal grandfather was Otho I de la Roche, Lord of Athens. According to a partially fictional tradition, her father Guy was created Duke of Athens in 1260 by King Louis IX of France.

== Marriage and issue ==
In 1249/1250, Alice married John II of Beirut. John and Alice had two daughters:

- Isabella of Ibelin, Lady of Beirut, Queen of Cyprus (1252- 1282/November 1283), married firstly King Hugh II of Cyprus, secondly Hamo le Strange, and thirdly, William Barlais. All three marriages were childless.
- Eschive of Ibelin, Lady of Beirut (1253–1312), married firstly, in 1274, Humphrey de Montfort, Lord of Tyre, by whom she had four children, including Rupen de Montfort; she married secondly in 1291, Guy of Lusignan, Constable of Cyprus, by whom she had two children, King Hugh IV of Cyprus, and Isabelle de Lusignan. Upon the death of her sister Isabella, who died without issue, Eschive inherited the lordship of Beirut. She unsuccessfully claimed the dukedom of Athens by right of her mother.

During her daughter Isabella's absence in Cyprus, from 1274 to 1277, Alice was regent of Beirut.

== Legacy ==
Alice died in 1282. In 1308, her nephew Guy II of Athens died childless. Alice's daughter Eschive claimed the dukedom, but lost to Walter V of Brienne, the son of Alice's younger sister Isabella.
