= Balian, Lord of Beirut =

Christian crusader (died 1247)

Balian

Lord of Beirut
- Predecessor: John I of Beirut
- Successor: John II of Beirut
- Born: Ascalon, Kingdom of Jerusalem
- Died: 1247
- Noble family: House of Ibelin-Beirut
- Spouse: Eschiva of Montbéliard
- Issue: Hugh of Beirut; John II of Beirut; Isabella of Ibelin (died ca 1250)
- Father: John I of Beirut
- Mother: Melisende of Arsuf

Balian III of Beirut (died 1247) was the lord of Beirut, the second of his family, from 1236, and a son of the famous "Old Lord" John of Ibelin, by his second wife Melisende of Arsuf. From his father he assumed the leadership of the nobility in the War of the Lombards, fought against the agents of Emperor Frederick II.

He was a warrior from an early age. At the Battle of Agridi in 1232, though he was supposed to be in the rearguard with his father and King Henry I of Cyprus, he instead went to the front, beside either Hugh of Ibelin and Anceau of Brie, commanders of the first and second battles. At the battle, Balian won fame defending a pass from the Lombards. A story is told in the Gestes des Chiprois that Balian once struck a Lombard knight so hard that he himself was dismounted.

Balian led his family in besieging Tyre in 1242. He also had the support of Philip of Novara and Philip of Montfort and he employed mercenaries and galleys in the endeavour.

Balian of Ibelin, lord of Beirut married Eschiva of Montbéliard and they had issue:

- Hugh 1231/32–1254/55, married (1250/53) to Marie of Montbéliard.
- John II of Beirut died 1264, married to Alice de la Roche, daughter of Guy I, Duke of Athens.
- Isabelle, married (c. 1250) to Henry I Embriaco de Giblet (died c. 1271).

== Sources ==
- Peters, Edward, ed. (1971). Christian Society and the Crusades, 1198-1229 (2nd ed.). University of Pennsylvania Press.
- Marshall, Christopher. Warfare in the Latin East, 1192–1291. Cambridge University Press, 1992.

Regnal titles
Preceded by John I of Beirut	Lord of Beirut; 1236–1247	Succeeded by Hugh of Beirut
