= Kantara Castle =

Medieval castle in Cyprus

- (Greek: Κάστρο της Καντάρας Turkish: Kantara Kalesi)
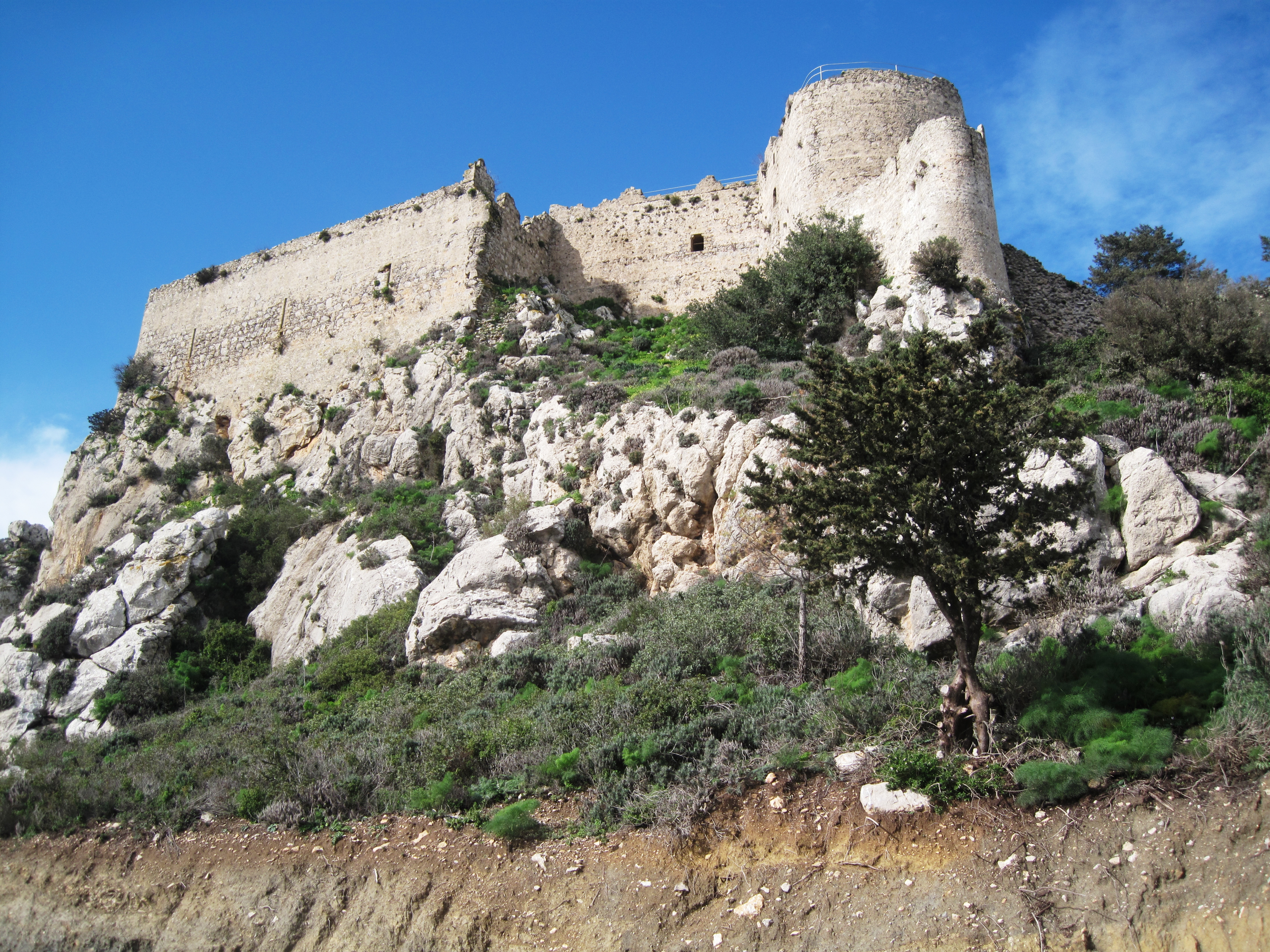
- Kantara Castle

- Location within Cyprus

General information
- Architectural style: Medieval
- Location: de jure Cyprus de facto Northern Cyprus
- Coordinates: 35.4064°N 33.9233°E

Kantara Castle (Greek: Κάστρο της Καντάρας Turkish: Kantara Kalesi) is a castle in Cyprus, in the area controlled by Northern Cyprus. The exact date of its construction is unknown, the most plausible theory being the Byzantine period. It combines Byzantine and Frankish architectural elements, became derelict in 1525 and was dismantled in 1560. It gave its name to the nearby Kantara Monastery.

== History ==
Kantara is situated to the east of Buffavento Castle with Saint Hilarion Castle standing farther to the west forming a protective axis in the Kyrenia Mountains. As the other castles are visible from Buffavento, it was used to pass signals between them. The castles were built in conjunction during the Byzantine period but the date of their commission is unknown. Theories to explain their date of origin include: In 965 (after the expulsion of the Arabs from the island), in 1091 by the rebel Rhapsomates, during the rule of Eumathios Philokales (1091–1094), in the late 11th century after the Cilician coast was overrun by the Seljuk Empire or in 1096 as a countermeasure for the upheaval caused by the First Crusade. The name of the castle derives from the Cypriot Arabic word kandak which means stone bridge.

Serving as a watchtower for pirate raids, an administrative centre and a place of incarceration, the castle saw next to no fighting. In 1191, it was taken by Richard the Lionheart during his campaign against the island's ruler Isaac Komnenos of Cyprus. Richard subsequently sold the island to the Knights Templar whose rule abruptly ended after a major revolt in Nicosia. Cyprus was thus resold to Guy of Lusignan, the former king of Jerusalem who became the first king of Cyprus in 1192. A period of peace ended with the death of Hugh I of Cyprus in 1218. A struggle over who should act as the kingdom's regent ensued, pitting the House of Ibelin with the local supporters of Frederick II, Holy Roman Emperor. Frederick's arrival in Limassol in 1228 escalated the conflict into an open war. In 1229, the castle came under siege by the Ibelins, who bombarded it with trebuchets, reportedly destroying several buildings. The castle's garrison surrendered a year later when its commander Gauvain de Cheneche was killed by a crossbow bolt. Afterwards, the Lusignans continued their reign interrupted only by occasional palace coups. In 1373, Cyprus was invaded by the Republic of Genoa who imprisoned the local nobility. According to Philip of Novara's chronicle prince John of Antioch escaped from Famagusta after disguising himself as the valet of his cook. John subsequently fled to Kantara, from which he organised a successful counter offensive that expelled the Genoese after the latter failed to capture Kantara.

Recognizing the importance of the three Kyrenian castles James I of Cyprus and Peter II of Cyprus vastly expanded their fortifications. During their reign Kantara was transformed into a garrison castle, barracks and an enormous cistern were erected. Another cistern located at the basement of the castle was converted into a prison and later made into rooms for the captain of garrison. In 1489, the Republic of Venice acquired the island, and in 1519 Italian engineers branded the castle as obsolete. At which time the Kyrenian mountain castles fell into disuse, the last garrison departing in 1525. The castle was finally dismantled in 1560. Kantara's buildings remain in a relatively good condition until they were subjected to looting in the early 20th century. In 1905, the castle was classified as historic heritage due to the efforts of the French archaeologist Camille Enlart. In 1914, British colonial authorities under George Jeffery undertook restoration work at the castle, in an effort to attract sightseers. In 1939, the foundation of the horseshoe tower was refurbished to prevent it from collapsing.

== Architecture ==
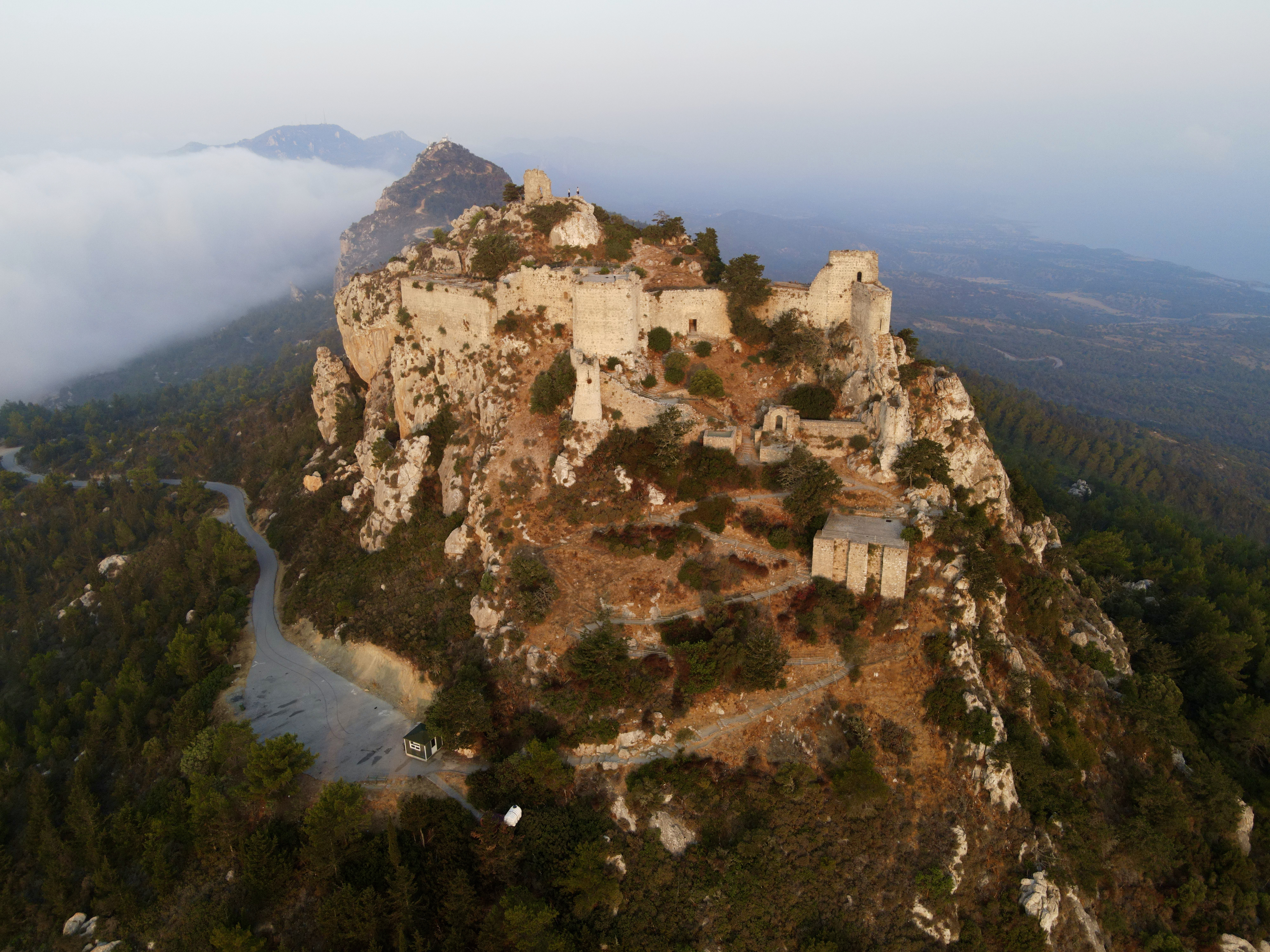
Aerial photo of the castle

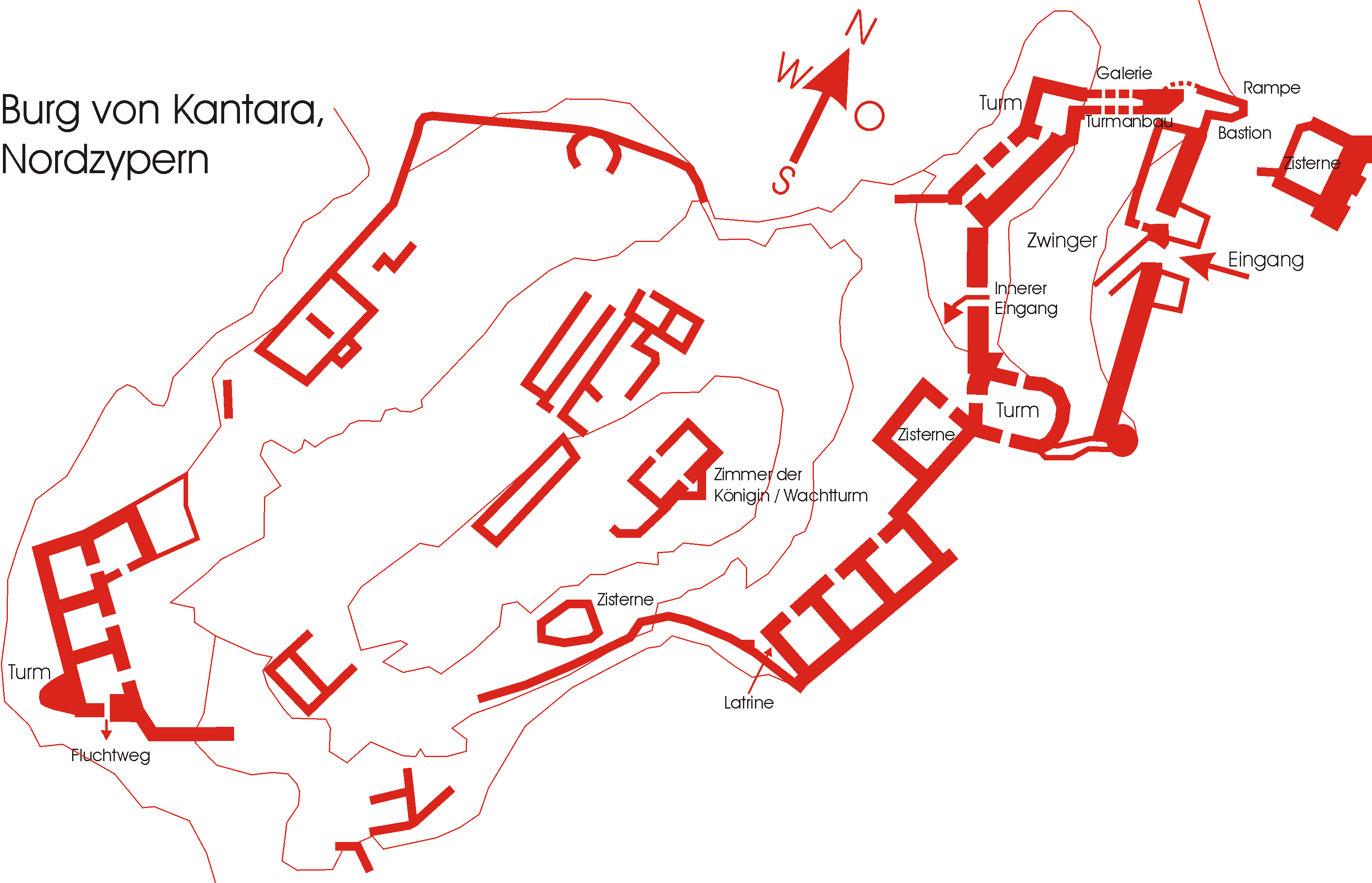
A plan of the Kantara Castle.

Kantara is situated on an elevation of 550–600 metres (1,800–1,970 ft) above sea level. The castle is surrounded by ridges of barren granite and sandstone bedrock which were used as the main building materials for the castle's construction. The materials were subjected to coarse masonry; most of the buildings are coated with thick layers of plaster to cover the poor quality of the materials. Doors, windows and quoins were transported from elsewhere. The lack of local water sources necessitated the collection of rainwater through the use flat roofs which were connected to the cisterns through a drainage system. Among the six cisterns used the largest stood outside the walls. Buildings contained bread ovens and perhaps even a mill.

The steep crags limit the available pathways to a narrow valley on its eastern side, which is guarded by twin towers named Nicolas and Faucherre. The first gate is followed by a barrel vaulted barbican, a steep chicane then leads to the portcullis protected main gate. The barbican shows great similarities with contemporary Cilician Armenian designs, having a gallery of arrowslits and two towers of its own. To the north of the main gate stands a horseshoe shaped tower providing additional support to the defenders of the barbican. The apsidal vault at the front of the tower facilitates better shock absorption. Despite its similarities to Roman and Byzantine military architecture it was constructed sometime between 1208 and 1228.

The surrounding 120 by 70 metres (390 ft × 230 ft) wall contained ten garrison rooms which were constructed in the late 14th century, the barracks were connected with a latrine. A concealed postern, guarded by two towers lies on the southwestern corner of the castle. A rectangular, barrel vaulted keep, used a prison and later converted into a cistern was built to the south of the main gate. The centre of its northern wall has a late 14th century Frankish window built from what once was an embrasure. The shape of the embrasures throughout the castle show that they were mainly used by crossbowmen. At the top of the castle stand the ruins of "The Queen's Chamber", an alleged fortified chapel destroyed in a Turkish naval bombardment in 1525 and looted in the 19th century.

== In popular culture ==
Kantara Castle appears in the video game Assassin's Creed: Bloodlines.

== See also ==
- List of Crusader castles

== Bibliography ==
- Molin, Bengt Kristian (1995). The Role of Castles in the Political and Military History of Crusader States and the Levant 1187 to 1380. etheses.whiterose.ac.uk (PhD thesis). Leeds: University of Leeds. pp. 1–448. EThOS uk.bl.ethos.393342.
- Morelle, Nicolas (2014). "The Castle of Kantara - A Key to the Evolution of Active Defense in the 13th Century Between the Eastern and the Western Worlds". The Castle Studies Group Journal. Exeter: Castle Studies Group: 292–318. ISSN 1741-8828.
- Petre, James (2010). Crusader Castles of Cyprus: The Fortifications of Cyprus under the Lusignans 1191–1489 (PDF) (PhD). Cardiff: University of Cardiff. pp. 1–413. OCLC 870568051.
- Ucar, Gulnur (2004). The Crusader Castles of Cyprus and Their Place within Crusader History (PDF). Middle East Technical University (PhD). Ankara. pp. 1–178. OCLC 58466417.
