= Maria of Antioch-Armenia =

Maria
- Lady of Toron
- Born: 1215
- Died: 1257 (aged 41–42)
- Spouse: Philip of Montfort, Lord of Tyre
- Issue: John of Montfort; Humphrey of Montfort
- House: House of Poitiers
- Father: Raymond-Roupen of Antioch
- Mother: Helvis of Lusignan

Maria of Antioch-Armenia (1215–1257) was lady of Toron from 1229 to her death. She was the elder daughter of Raymond-Roupen, prince of Antioch, and of Helvis of Lusignan. She derived her title of Lady of Toron and claim to the throne of Armenia from her father.

Maria's paternal grandmother, Alice of Armenia, became lady of Toron when Emperor Frederick II, at the end of the Sixth Crusade, negotiated the return of lands conquered by Saladin; Maria succeeded her as she was the closest surviving relative.

In 1240 she married Philip of Montfort, Lord of Tyre, previously lord of Castres, and they had the following children:

- John (died 1283), lord of Toron and Tyre
- Humphrey (died 1284), lord of Beirut and Tyre
- Philippa (d. 1282), married William, lord of Esneval in Normandy
- Alice, living in 1282 and in 1295
- Helvis, living in 1282 and in 1295

She was the great-granddaughter of Roupen III, prince of Armenia (Roupen III's daughter was Alice), who had been succeeded by his brother Leo I. Maria thus unsuccessfully claimed rights to the throne of Armenia, something her father and grandmother had previously attempted and failed.

== Sources ==
- This page is a translation of fr:Marie d'Antioche (1215-).
- http://generoyer.free.fr/H-PhilippedeMONTFORT.htm

Preceded by Alice of Armenia	Lady of Toron c. 1236–1257; With: Philip of Montfort	Succeeded by John of Montfort
