= Margaret of Antioch-Lusignan =

- Lady of Tyre
- Died: 30 January 1308
- Spouse: John of Montfort, Lord of Tyre (d. 1283)
- Father: Henry of Antioch
- Mother: Isabella of Cyprus

Margaret of Antioch-Lusignan (French: Marguerite; c. 1244 – 30 January 1308), also known as Margaret of Tyre, was an Outremer noblewoman who ruled the Lordship of Tyre in the Kingdom of Jerusalem. A member of the House of Antioch-Lusignan, she married John of Montfort, Lord of Tyre, and was granted rule of the city as widow in 1284. She concluded a truce with the Egyptian sultan Al-Mansur Qalawun and ruled until 1291, when she ceded the lordship and moved to Cyprus.

== Dynastic position ==
Margaret was the younger child of the Lusignan Cypriot princess Isabella and Henry, member of the Ramnulfid dynasty which ruled the Principality of Antioch. Like her brother, King Hugh III of Cyprus, Margaret adopted her mother's name. The Templar of Tyre, who served as her page in 1268, recorded that she was "particularly fair of face" at the time, but that later in life she became "enormously fat" and started to resemble her father. According to British historian Steven Runciman, Margaret was considered "the loveliest girl of her generation".

King Hugh III of Cyprus, Margaret's brother, became also King of Jerusalem in 1268, ending a long period of absentee Hohenstaufen kings during which the city of Tyre had been alienated from the royal demesne by Philip of Montfort. Hugh was, however, not only too weak to act against Philip but also needed his help in defending the remnants of the kingdom against the neighbouring Mamluk Sultanate. The two men thus came to an agreement: Philip's son John of Montfort would marry Margaret and Hugh would grant Tyre to John and his descendants by Margaret. If the couple were childless, the lordship would revert to the royal demesne. Philip accepted and ceded rule over Tyre to his son. This marriage may have been envisaged even before Hugh ascended the throne of Jerusalem, but it only took place in 1269.

== Rule ==
Margaret was widowed on 27 November 1283. Her husband had been severely afflicted by gout and she had no children by him. King Hugh allowed the lordship of Tyre to pass to her brother-in-law Humphrey, but reclaimed it when he died on 12 February 1284. Margaret was then confirmed as Lady of Tyre, while her brother died in March.

The Mamluk sultan Al-Mansur Qalawun made clear his intention to attack the remaining Crusader states in 1285. Margaret and her sister-in-law Eschiva of Ibelin, who ruled Beirut alone since Humphrey's death, quickly moved to secure a truce with him. The text of Margaret's treaty with Qalawun survives, signed by "the exalted Lady, Dame Margaret, the daughter of Sir Henry, the son of Prince Bohemond, the Lady of Tyre", and is considered exemplary of early Mamluk diplomacy.

In 1291, Margaret ceded the lordship of Tyre to her nephew, Amalric. She then retired to Cyprus, now ruled by her nephew King Henry II, and entered the monastery of Our Lady of Tyre in Nicosia. She died there as a nun on 30 January 1308.

== Bibliography ==
- Jackson-Laufer, Guida Myrl (1999). Women Rulers Throughout the Ages: An Illustrated Guide. ABC-CLIO. ISBN 1576070913.
- Runciman, Steven (1987). A History of the Crusades. Vol. 3. Cambridge University Press. ISBN 0521347726.
- Holt, Peter Malcolm (1995). Early Mamluk Diplomacy, 1260-1290: Treaties of Baybars and Qalāwūn with Christian Rulers. BRILL. ISBN 9004102469.
- Hodgson, Natsha R. (2007). Women, Crusading and the Holy Land in Historical Narrative. Boydell Press. ISBN 978-1843833321.
- Crawford, Paul (2003). The 'Templar of Tyre': Part III of the 'Deeds of the Cypriots'. Ashgate. ISBN 1840146184.
- Edbury, Peter W. (2001). "The De Montforts in Jerusalem". Thirteenth Century England VIII: Proceedings of the Durham Conference 1999. Boydell & Brewer. ISBN 0851158129.

Regnal titles
Preceded by Humphrey of Montfort	Lady of Tyre; 1284-1291	Succeeded by Amalric of Lusignan
