= Battle of Agridi =

1232 battle in Cyprus

- Part of the War of the Lombards
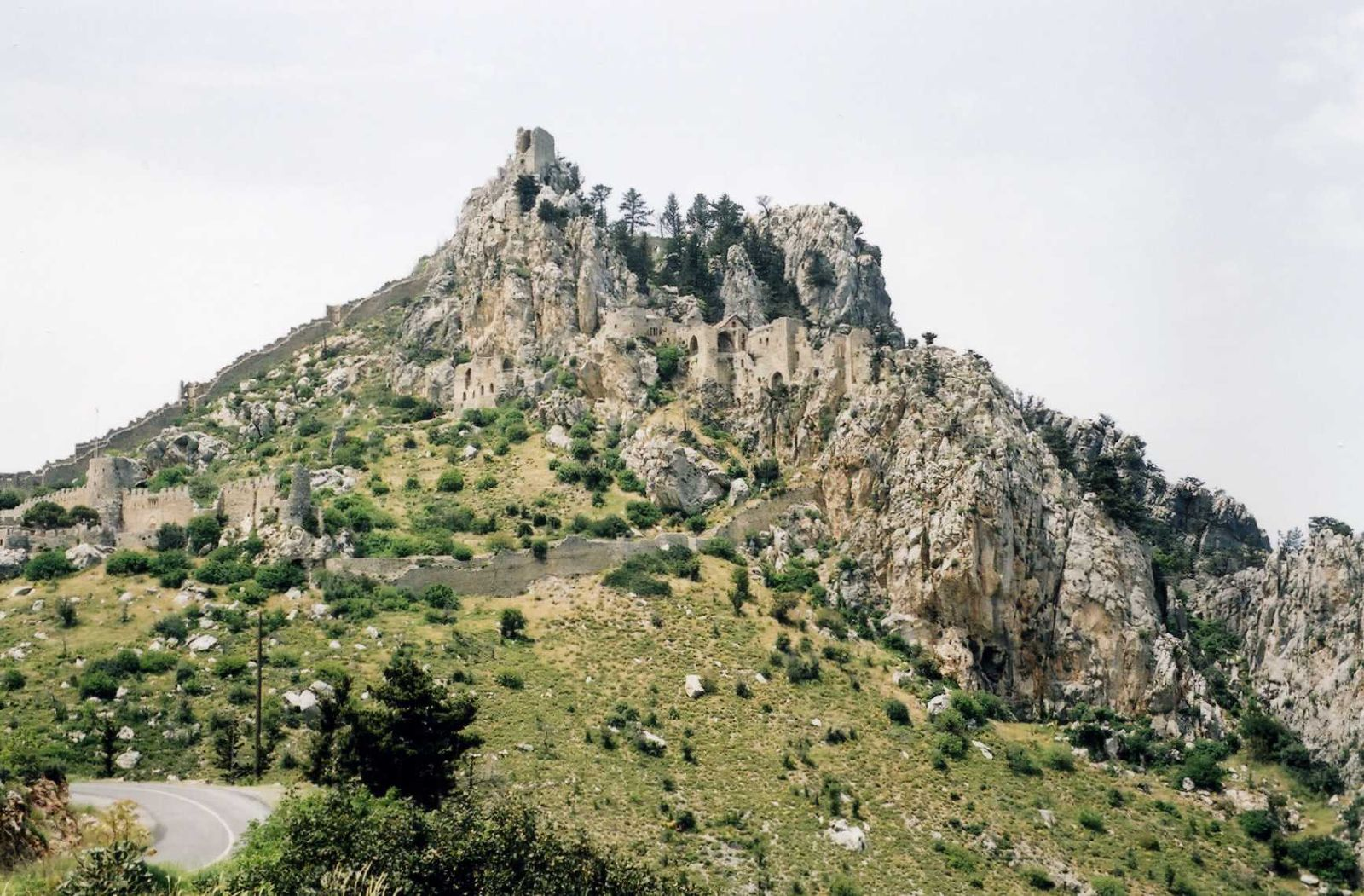
- Saint Hilarion Castle
Date	15 June 1232
Location	Agridi, Cyprus
Result	Cypriot victory

Belligerents
Holy Roman Empire; Republic of Genoa	Kingdom of Cyprus; House of Ibelin

Commanders and leaders
Richard Filangieri; Walter of Manepeau; Berart of Manepeau †	John I of Beirut; Henry I of Cyprus; Balian of Beirut; Hugh of Ibelin; Anceau of Brie; Baldwin of Ibelin; John of Caesarea; John of Ibelin

Strength
2,000 cavalry	233 cavalry 50–60 infantry

Casualties and losses
60 killed 40 captured	

The Battle of Agridi was fought on 15 June 1232 between the forces loyal to King Henry I of Cyprus (such as those of the Ibelin family) and the imperial army of Holy Roman Emperor Frederick II. It resulted in an Ibelin victory and the successful relief of the siege of Dieudamour, an Ibelin castle on Cyprus.

Frederick II, considering himself suzerain of the Kingdom of Cyprus, appointed five bailiffs to govern Cyprus in the name of the King Henry—who was a minor—to the displeasure of the local nobility. This was opposed by the Ibelin family and their partisans, who went to war with the five bailiffs. Initially successful in controlling the chief fortresses of the island, in the first half of 1232, one of the bailiffs, Aimery Barlais, conquered most of Cyprus save Dieudamour and Buffavento for the Emperor. The Ibelins responded by trying to bribe the Genoese into an alliance by offering them commercial privileges at Cypriot ports as well as land grants. This failed, however.

The Ibelins and Cypriots assembled a force of 233 mounted men opposed to the Lombard force of 2,000. Their army was divided into five battles. Four were lined up under the command of Hugh of Ibelin, Anceau of Brie, Baldwin of Ibelin, and John of Caesarea. Balian of Beirut, though he was supposed to be with the rearguard, lined up at the front beside Hugh and Anceau. The rearguard was commanded by John I of Beirut and King Henry.

The Lombard vanguard was led by Walter of Manepeau, who charged as far as the Ibelin rearguard beforing turning around and leading his men at the fourth battle under John of Caesarea. They were repulsed and fled. The second Lombard battle made a successful charge at the force under Hugh's command, but the men of Anceau came to his rescue. After this, "battle subsequently developed as a series of confused individual combats, in which some great feats of arms were performed. . . . though carried out from a position of complete order, [the charge] had merely been the prelude to an untidy mêlée."

During the mêlée, Berart of Manepeau was dismounted by Anceau of Brie and seventeen comrades who dismounted to help him were killed by sergeants on foot before he recovered. The young Balian gained a reputation defending a pass from the Lombards. In the end, the arrival of between 50 and 60 foot sergeants (sergans à pié) from the town of Agridi was critical to their success. According to the Estoire d'Eracles:

". . . une chose y ot, qui aida moult a Chypreis: ce que il avoient sergens a pié; dont il avenoit que, quant un de lor chevaliers estoit abatus, que li sergent le relevoient, et le remetoient a cheval. Et quant un des autres estoit abatus, piestant l'ocioient li sergent et prenoient . . ."

. . . there was one thing which greatly helped the Cypriots: they had foot sergeants, which meant that when one of their knights was knocked down, the sergeants helped him up and remounted him on a horse. And when one of the Lombards was struck down, he was either killed or captured by the foot sergeants.

Following the battle, John of Beirut, with funds from King Henry, hired thirteen Genoese galleys to aid in the siege of Kyrenia.
