= Thierry of Orgue =

Thierry d'Orca (French: Thierry d'Orgue or Their d'Orguenes, Latin: Theodoricus de Orca, before 1174–1207) was Lord of Arsuf by marriage in the Kingdom of Jerusalem.

Thierry was probably a French knight who came with the Third Crusade to the Holy Land in 1190. Their origin is unknown.

It was among the retinue of Count Henry II of Champagne, who ascended as King of Jerusalem in 1192. This allowed him to marry Melisende of Arsuf, the heiress of the Lordship of Arsuf.

He had seven daughters with Melisande, all of them were killed before him. d'Orca died in 1207 without any heirs. After his death, his widow married with John of Ibelin, the "Old Lord of Beirut."
