= Service of marriage =

Legal obligation in Kingdom of Jerusalem

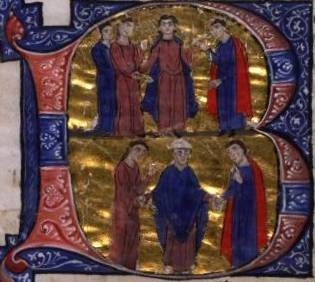
Betrothal and marriage of an heiress as depicted in 13th-century Acre

The service of marriage (Old French: service de mariage) was a legal obligation in the Kingdom of Jerusalem of a female vassal towards her lord. Since her sex precluded her from rendering personal military service, marriage was regarded as a service a liegewoman could perform instead.

When summoned, the vassal had to choose a husband among three candidates presented to her by her lord. The lord was obliged to suggest only men who were not inferior in rank to her or to any former husband she may have had. The intention was to attach to her fief a consort who could render personal service to her lord. A widowed heiress could not be compelled to remarry for a year and a day after her husband's death.

A vassal's widow had the right to rule his lands on behalf of their minor child, but if she refused to perform the service of marriage, the lord was allowed by law to take over the management of the child's land. Otherwise, jurists Balian of Sidon, John of Beirut, and Ralph of Tiberias disagreed on which penalty a liegewoman should be subjected to if she withheld the service of marriage.

In the early 13th century, lords frequently treated cases arbitrarily. Beatrice, heiress of Joscelin of Courtenay, violated her feudal contract by marrying Otto of Henneberg without King Aimery's permission, but the couple were not hindered from granting their lands to the Teutonic Knights after the king's death. A regent could punish the liegewoman for such an infringement of her lord's rights by confiscating her fief, but the measure ceased to have effect when the regency ended. King Hugh failed to enforce the service of marriage from the lady of Beirut, Isabella, who was put under the protection of the Egyptian ruler Baibars by her husband, Hamo le Strange.
