= Lordship of Tyre =

Semi-independent domain of the Kingdom of Jerusalem (1246–1291)

The Lordship of Tyre was a semi-independent domain in the Kingdom of Jerusalem from 1246 to 1291.

== Background ==
The town of Tyre was an important port on the Palestinian coast of the Fatimid Caliphate in the late 11th century. The town was located on a peninsula that a narrow strip of land linked to the mainland. Tyre was surrounded by impressive walls, but its burghers provided the crusaders with food when they invaded Palestine in May 1099, because the townspeople wanted to avoid an armed conflict with these Christians who had departed from Europe to Jerusalem in 1096. In two months, the crusaders captured Jerusalem. Pisan, Genoese and Venetian fleets supported them to conquer most Fatimid ports on the Western coast of the Mediterranean Sea during the next decade. Caesarea surrendered to them in 1101, Acre in 1104, Tripoli in 1109, and Beirut and Sidon in 1110.

The first king of Jerusalem, Baldwin I, tried to capture Tyre in 1107 for the first time, but he soon abandoned the siege. After the fall of Tripoli and Beirut, hundreds of the Muslim inhabitants of the two towns sought refuge in Tyre which remained a Fatimid enclave. Baldwin I again laid siege to Tyre in late November 1111, but the defenders destroyed his siege tower using iron grapnels that a refugee from Tripoli manufactured. The crusaders (or Franks) were again forced to lift the siege on 10 April 1112. However, the crusaders took control of most villages in the town's vicinity.

The Artuqid ruler Nur al-Daulak Balak captured Baldwin I's successor, Baldwin II, in north Syria in 1123. The king was still imprisoned when a Venetian fleet of 120 ships reached the coast of the kingdom under the command of Doge Domenico Michiel. On behalf of the king, Warmund of Picquigny, the Latin patriarch of Jerusalem, concluded a treaty with the Doge about the conquest of Tyre. The treaty, known as Pactum Warmundi, established the Venetians' right to seize one-third of Tyre and the nearby villages and to administer justice to all who lived in their district. The pact also granted one-third of the royal revenues collected in the town.

The Venetians and the Franks laid siege to the town in February 1124. After receiving no support from the Fatimids and the nearby Muslim rulers, the burghers of the town surrendered on 7 July 1124. Most Muslim burghers left Tyre, but many of them stayed behind and continued to live under the Franks' rule. The Venetians took possession of their district and at least sixteen nearby villages. Baldwin II insisted on modifying the Pactum Warmundi after he was released and returned to Jerusalem in 1125. His treaty with the Venetians obliged them to participate in the defense of the kingdom, thus transforming their possessions into a fief held from the monarch. Baldwin II authorized the Pisans to seize five houses near the harbour in the late 1120s. They also bought a caravanserai, most probably from King Amalric in 1168.

To fulfill her military obligations to the king, the Republic of Venice granted hereditary estates in her fief to Venetian patricians with the obligation to provide military service as horsemen in case of a war. Initially, the Venetians owed the service of at least five knights, but it was reduced to three by the 1180s, most probably as a consequence of the loss of Venetian properties to the monarchs. The Venetians were also deprived of their share of the tolls collected at the land gate of Tyre in the 1130s.

== Territory ==
Covering a rectangular area of about 450 km^{2} (110,000 acres), the lordship was one of the smallest domains in the Kingdom of Jerusalem. The Qassimiye River formed its northern border. The lordship's southern border was located about 15 km to the south of Tyre. Its eastern boundary run about 20 km from the coast. The lordship consisted of a narrow strip of land along the coast and a hilly western region. Documents from the crusader period list more than 110 villages and hamlets in the lordship, but the actual number of settlements was a slightly higher. Most villages were located in the western region.

The Venetian patricians' fiefs consisted of estates in the countryside and a house in the Venetian district of Tyre, and some of them also included a share of communal revenues. Vitale Pantaleo received two villages (Dairrham and Gaifiha), and one-third of two other villages (Maharona and Cafardan) in addition to a house in the town and 60 bezants from the tolls collected at the market of musical instruments. His house was held by the husband of a woman from the Pantaleo family in the 1240s. A member of the Contarini family, Rolando, received 12 villages and a share in four other villages, in addition to his house in the town. For Contarini died childless before 1158, the Venetian bailli demanded the return of his fief from his widow, Guida Gradenigo, but she resisted and bequeathed her husband's estates to the king to secure royal protection. Guida was a wealthy widow: she held a whole village, one third of four additional villages and a house in Tyre on her own right. After her death, her late husbands' rural estates were seized by the monarch.

== Montfort lordship ==
In 1242, during the War of the Lombards, Tyre was seized by the Ibelin faction. It was initially placed under the governance of Balian of Ibelin, Lord of Beirut, but in 1246 the Ibelin-backed regent, King Henry I of Cyprus, formally placed it in the custody of Philip of Montfort. All of this was of questionable legality, but there was not doubt that Philip had no title to Tyre. Nevertheless, he soon began to style himself "Lord of Tyre and Toron".

In 1258, during the War of Saint Sabas, Philip expelled the Venetians from Tyre. Thereafter, Tyre was the headquarters of the Genoese in the Kingdom of Jerusalem, as Acre, from which they had been expelled, was of the Venetians.

In 1268, King Hugh III of Cyprus became King of Jerusalem and immediately took steps to regularize the position of Tyre, although whether negotiations were initiated by him or by Philip is not known. In the resulting accord, the king's sister Margaret married Philip's son John and Hugh enfeoffed the latter with Tyre, which Philip voluntarily handed over. The agreement contained a clause whereby in the event of an escheat, the crown would pay the Montforts 150,000 Saracen bezants as an indemnity towards the costs of fortifying and defending Tyre for all the years of Philip's lordship.

As an indication of their independence, Philip and John minted copper coins and made treaties with the Muslims. The numismatist D. M. Metcalf suggests that the coinage may have originated in 1269, when Philip's position was regularized, but it could have come earlier, since Philip had been making his own policy since at least 1258. In 1271, John made a separate treaty with the Mamluk sultan Baybars to cover Tyre, a year before Hugh III made a similar treaty to cover the area around Acre.

John and Margaret had no children, and upon John's death in 1283 Tyre escheated to the crown. Unable to pay the indemnity, Hugh reached an agreement with John's younger brother Humphrey, who was to hold Tyre provisionally until the indemnity was paid and, if it was not paid by May 1284, hold it permanently. Both Hugh and Humphrey died before that date and Tyre escheated. It is not known if the indemnity was paid to Humphrey's heirs.

In the late 1280s, King Henry II enfeoffed his younger brother Amalric with Tyre. Exactly when is not known, but he was lord of Tyre by 1289 at the latest. He held it until it was captured by the Mamluks in 1291.

== Lords of Tyre ==
- Tyre is part of the royal domain (1124–1129)
- Fulk of Anjou (1129–1131)
- Tyre is part of the royal domain (1131–1187)
- Conrad of Montferrat, de facto (1187–1190), de jure (1190–1192)
- Tyre is part of the royal domain (1192–1246)
- Philip of Montfort (1246–1269)
- John of Montfort (1269–1283)
- Humphrey of Montfort (1283–1284)
- Tyre is part of the royal domain (1284–1289)
- Amalric of Lusignan (1289–1291)

== Sources ==
- Edbury, Peter W. (1993). The Kingdom of Cyprus and the Crusades, 1191–1374. Cambridge University Press.
- Edbury, Peter W. (2001). "The De Montforts in the Latin East". Thirteenth Century England. 8: 23–32.
- Jacoby, David (2016). "The Venetian presence in the crusader Lordship of Tyre: A tale of decline". In Boas, Adrian J. (ed.). The Crusader World. Routledge. pp. 181–194. ISBN 978-0-415-82494-1.
- Jotischky, Andrew (2017). Crusading and the Crusader States. Routledge. ISBN 978-1-138-80806-5.
- Maalouf, Amin (1984). The Crusades Through Arab Eyes. SAQI. ISBN 978-0-86356-023-1.
- Metcalf, D. M. (1995). Coinage of the Crusades and the Latin East in the Ashmolean Museum Oxford. Royal Numismatic Society.
- Prawer, Joshua (1998). Crusader Institutions. Oxford University Press. ISBN 0-19-822536-9.
