= Henry of Antioch =

French noble in Jerusalem (1217–1276)

- Born: 1217
- Died: 27 June 1276 (aged 58–59)
- Spouse: Isabella of Cyprus
- Issue: Hugh III of Cyprus; Margaret of Tyre
- House: Poitiers
- Father: Bohemond IV of Antioch
- Mother: Plaisance of Gibelet

Henry of Antioch (French: Henri; 1217 – 27 June 1276) was a nobleman from the Latin East who governed the Kingdom of Jerusalem from 1263 until 1264. He was made bailli by his wife, Isabella of Cyprus, who exercised regency on behalf of their nephew King Hugh II of Cyprus. He died in a shipwreck after their son, Hugh III, became king of both Cyprus and Jerusalem.

== Family ==
Henry was born in 1217. He was the youngest of the four sons of Prince Bohemond IV of Antioch and his first wife, Plaisance Embriaco. Bohemond IV had a tense relationship with the Ibelin family becauzse they opposed the idea that his son Bohemond V should govern the Kingdom of Cyprus after marrying Queen Alice, mother of King Henry I. He reconciled with the Ibelins in order to resist the ambitions of Emperor Frederick II, who attempted to assert his authority over the Crusader states. The young Bohemond's marriage to Alice was annulled, and the prince of Antioch instead readily consented to John of Ibelin's suggestion that the former's younger son Henry should marry King Henry's sister Isabella. They married c. 1233, and had two children, Hugh and Margaret. Henry received substantial lands on Cyprus from his brother-in-law the king.

Henry's father, Bohemond IV, died in 1233. Shortly after, Henry was sent by his brother Bohemond V to assist the Hospitallers and the Templars in attacking Baarin. The campaign ended when the defenders promised to pay a tribute to the Hospital.

== Lieutenancy ==
King Henry died in 1253. His son, King Hugh II of Cyprus, was regarded as the heir presumptive of the absent King Conrad III of Jerusalem and was thus recognized as regent by the High Court of Jerusalem. But King Hugh was a minor, and so the regency was exercised on his behalf by his mother, Queen Plaisance. Plaisance died in 1261. Henry's wife Isabella, aunt and closest relative of King Hugh, waived her right to Cypriot regency in favour of their son, Hugh. But in 1263, Isabella claimed the right to exercise regency in the Kingdom of Jerusalem on Hugh's behalf. She and Henry arrived in Acre, the capital of what had remained of the mainland kingdom, to assume the reins of government shortly after Baibars attacked.

Isabella deputised Henry to act as her bailli. This appointment was resented, possibly because coming from the ruling family of Antioch made Henry appear as an outsider. The High Court refused them fealty and homage, claiming that they should have brought King Hugh with them. The following year, Pope Urban IV implored Henry, John II of Beirut, Geoffrey of Sergines, and John of Jaffa to settle their differences for the sake of the kingdom. Little is known about Henry's government. It was cut short by Isabella's death in 1264, as his lieutenancy then lapsed.

== Aftermath ==
Henry and Isabella's son, Hugh, was selected to exercise regency in Jerusalem after Isabella's death. When the young kings of Cyprus and Jerusalem died in 1267 and 1268, respectively, Henry's son ascended both thrones. Henry died in a shipwreck on 27 June 1276 when the taride carrying him from Acre to Cyprus hit a rock. He was buried in the church of the Knights Hospitaller in Nicosia, Cyprus.
