= Templar of Tyre =

Anonymous 14th-century historian

Templar of Tyre (French: Templier de Tyr) is the conventional designation of the anonymous 14th-century historian who compiled the Old French chronicle known as the Deeds of the Cypriots (French: Gestes des Chiprois). The Deeds was written between about 1315 and 1320 on Cyprus and presents a history of the Crusader states and the Kingdom of Cyprus from 1132 down to 1309 as well as an account of the trials of the Templars in 1314. It is divisible into three parts and the third, which is the original work of the compiler, is the most important source for the final years of the Kingdom of Jerusalem and one of only two eyewitness accounts of the fall of Acre in 1291.

== Author ==
All that can be known of the anonymous author/compiler must be derived from the text of the Deeds itself. The designation Templar of Tyre, implying that the author/compiler was a member of the Knights Templar resident in Tyre, has long been recognised as ungrounded. It was based on his evident association with Guillaume de Beaujeu, master of the Templars from 1273 until 1291, and his long residence in Tyre between 1269 and 1283. In fact, he is unlikely to have been a Templar knight himself since he would have been arrested along with all the other Templars in Cyprus in 1308.

The author was born about 1255 and would have been no more than fifteen years of age when he was a page of Margaret of Antioch-Lusignan in 1269. He served her as a page for one year and was present at her wedding in Tyre to John of Montfort in 1269. As Margaret was the sister of King Hugh III of Cyprus, it is likely that her pages were drawn from the Cypriot nobility and that "Templar of Tyre" was born in Cyprus to a lesser noble family.

The author was fluent in Arabic and translated letters from the Egyptian sultan al-Ashraf Khalil to Guillaume de Beaujeu into French.

== Text ==
The Deeds is preserved in a single Cypriot manuscript (MS Torino, Biblioteca Reale, Varia 433) that was copied in 1343 for the head of the Mimars family by his prisoner, John le Miege, in the castle of Kyrenia. Both the beginning and end of the text are missing. The text probably originally began with Creation, but in its present state it begins in 1132. Likewise, the narrative ends abruptly in mid-1309 but originally extended a little further. Probably it did not go further than 1321, almost certainly no further than 1324.

The three divisions of the work are based on different sources. The first, which takes the narrative down to 1224, is derived from the Annales de Terre Sainte. The second, which covers the years 1223–1242 and the War of the Lombards, is derived from the History of the War between the Emperor Frederick and Sir John of Ibelin by Philip of Novara and also contains five poems written by Philip on the war. The third makes use of the Estoire d'Eracles, which it calls the Livre dou conquest, to fill in the period down to 1270, after which the compiler makes use of his own memory and oral testimony to write an original account of the final years of the Kingdom of Jerusalem and the following two decades on Cyprus. Although the surviving text is cut off in mid-1309, it does contain a detailed report on the trial of the Templars in 1314.
