= John II of Beirut =

John II

Lord of Beirut
- Reign: 1254–1264
- Predecessor: Balian of Beirut
- Successor: Isabella of Beirut
- Died: 1264
- Buried: Nicosia
- Noble family: House of Ibelin-Beirut
- Spouse: Alice de la Roche of Athens
- Issue: Isabella of Beirut; Eschiva of Beirut
- Father: Balian of Beirut
- Mother: Eschiva of Montbéliard

John of Ibelin (died 1264), often called John II, was the Lord of Beirut from 1254, named after his grandfather John I, the famous "Old Lord of Beirut", son of Balian of Ibelin, who surrendered Jerusalem to Saladin in 1187. His parents were Balian of Beirut and Eschiva of Montbéliard.

== Biography ==
John inherited the Lordship of Beirut from Hugh of Ibelin. In 1258, by "manipulat[ing] the complex regency laws", John and his compatriot John of Jaffa, succeeded in aligning the feudatories of Jerusalem with the Republic of Venice against that of Genoa in the War of Saint Sabas. He took part in a very large raid alongside the Templars into Galilee in February 1261. They were defeated at the camp near Tiberias in a route by some Turcomen and John was taken captive along with John of Gibelet and Thomas Bérard, Grand Master of the Knights Templar. His ransom alone was 20,000 bezants.

John married Alice de la Roche, daughter of Duke Guy I of Athens. They had:

- Isabelle 1252–1282/83, lady of Beirut, who married Hugh II of Cyprus; the marriage was not consummated, then Haymo Létrange, Nicolas l'Alleman and William Barlais.
- Eschive 1253–1312, lady of Beirut, who married Humphrey de Montfort, lord of Tyre and Guy, constable of Cyprus.

== Sources ==
- Bronstein, Judith (2005). The Hospitallers and the Holy Land: Financing the Latin East, 1187-1274. Boydell Press. ISBN 9781843831310.
- Burgtorf, Jochen (2008). The Central Convent of Hospitallers and Templars: History, Organization, and Personnel (1099/1120-1310). Brill. ISBN 9789004166608.
- Marshall, Christopher (1992). Warfare in the Latin East, 1192–1291. Cambridge University Press.
- Runciman, Steven (1999). A History of the Crusades. Vol. III: The Kingdom of Acre and the Later Crusades. Cambridge University Press.

Preceded by Hugh of Beirut	Lord of Beirut; 1254–1264	Succeeded by Isabella of Ibelin
