= Hugh of Beirut =

Hugh of Beirut (died 1254) was the Lord of Beirut, the third of his family, from 1247 and by marriage titular Prince of Galilee. His parents were Balian of Ibelin and Eschiva of Montbéliard.

He married Maria of Montbéliard, titular princess of Galilee, daughter of Odo of Montbéliard and Eschiva of Saint Omer, but had no children.

Preceded by Balian of Beirut	Lord of Beirut; 1247–1254	Succeeded by John II of Beirut
