= William Barlais =

Lord of Beirut in the Kingdom of Jerusalem

- Lord of Beirut
- Noble family: Barlais
- Spouses: Isabella, Lady of Beirut; Alice of Mandelée
- Father: Amalrich Barlais

William or Guillaume Barlais was a Lord of Beirut in the Kingdom of Jerusalem, via his marriage to Isabella of Beirut in 1277 - he was her fourth and final husband. They died childless and she had no children from her previous three marriages to Hugh II of Cyprus, Hamo le Strange and Nicolas l’Aleman - the Lordship of Beirut thus passed to her sister Eschiva of Ibelin and her husband Humphrey of Montfort, Lord of Tyre.

== Life ==
His lineage is unknown, although he may be identifiable with the William Barlais who was son of Amalrich Barlais. After Isabella's death, he remarried to Alice, daughter of William of Mandelée, Lord of Scandaleon - on William Barlais' death, Alice remarried to Ague of Bethsan.

== Bibliography ==
- Europäische Stammtafeln, Band III, Tafel 564, 631
- Charles du Cange: Les Familles d'outre-mer. Publiées par Emmanuel Guillaume-Rey. Imprimerie Impériale, Paris 1869.
