= Baldwin of Ibelin, Seneschal of Cyprus =

French nobleman (died 1267)

Baldwin

Seneschal of Cyprus
- Reign: 1246–1267
- Predecessor: Aimery de Rivet
- Successor: Robert de Cresque
- Died: 21 February 1267
- Noble family: House of Ibelin
- Spouses: Alix, daughter of Walter III of Bethsan
- Issue: John of Ibelin (died after 1250); Philip of Ibelin (died 1304); Guy; Balian; Hugh
- Father: John of Ibelin, the Old Lord of Beirut
- Mother: Melisende of Arsuf

Baldwin of Ibelin (Note: In contemporary records messier Bauduyn ceneschal de Chipre, Bauduin de Ybelin seneschal de Chipre, or Baduin de Iblim senescalco de Cypro.) (died 21 February 1267) was the fourth of five sons of John I of Beirut and his second wife Melisende of Arsuf.

He commanded the third battaile at the Battle of Agridi in 1232. In 1246, he was appointed Seneschal of Cyprus and was taken captive at the Battle of Mansurah in 1250.

Baldwin married Alix, daughter of Walter III of Bethsan and Theodora Comnena Lathoumena. She was called la Seneschalece and with her he had six children:

- John, married Isabelle du Rivet
- Philip, Constable of Cyprus
- Guy, married Maria, daughter of Hetoum I of Armenia and Isabella, Queen of Armenia
- Balian, married Marguerite Visconte
- Hugh, regent of Cyprus in 1306
- Melisende, died young

== Sources ==
- Marshall, Christopher (1992). Warfare in the Latin East, 1192–1291. Cambridge University Press.
- Setton, Kenneth M., ed. (1969). A History of the Crusades. The University of Wisconsin Press.
