= Nicholas and Thomas Aleman =

Lords of Caesarea, Kingdom of Jerusalem

The brothers Nicholas and Thomas Aleman (floruit 1277) were the last lords of Caesarea before the title went into abeyance. They lived in the Kingdom of Cyprus. Neither ruled over Caesarea, since the city had been conquered by the Mamelukes under Baibars in 1265. In 1264, their older brother Hugh died in a riding accident while their father, John Aleman, was still lord of Caesarea. Their mother, Margaret of Caesarea, the heiress of the fief, disappears from contemporary records after 1255.

Nicholas married Isabella, daughter of Lord John II of Beirut and already twice widowed: first by King Hugh II of Cyprus and second by Hamo le Strange, an Englishman. In 1277, Nicholas assassinated John, son of Guy of Ibelin, in Nicosia. Soon after he was in turn killed by John's brother, Baldwin of Ibelin, constable of Cyprus. After his death, Isabella remarried for the fourth time to William Barlais, but by none of her husbands did she leave any children.

According to the Lignages d'Outremer, Thomas succeeded Nicholas as lord of Caesarea. He was married to Agnes, daughter of Raoul de la Blanchegarde. They died without heirs, and the title went into abeyance.
