= Martyrs of Kantara =

Eastern Orthodox saints and martyrs

- Died: May 1231, Nicosia, Kingdom of Cyprus
- Martyred by: Roman Catholic Church
- Means of martyrdom: Burned alive
- Venerated in: Eastern Orthodox Church
- Feast: 19 May

The martyrs of Kantara were thirteen Orthodox monks from the Kantara monastery in Cyprus, who were persecuted and executed in May 1231 on the request of Pope Gregory IX and under the direction of his emissary, Andrew. After an inquisition trial for refusing the use of unleavened bread for the Eucharist, they were imprisoned, tortured, and then burned alive. One of them died in prison before the execution.

They are venerated in the Eastern Orthodox Church and more specifically in the Church of Cyprus as martyrs on 19 May. The story of their martyrdom is partially recounted in a hagiographic text dating from the 1270s called the Narratio of the Thirteen Martyrs.

== History ==
=== Sources ===
The event and the execution of the thirteen monks are known in part through a text written around 1270, called the Narratio of the Thirteen Martyrs, as well as through letters exchanged between Patriarch Germanus II of Constantinople and Pope Gregory IX, where they discussed the event. Later Dominican sources also mentioned the events, criticizing the thirteen monks.

Apart from these sources, there are other relatively numerous occurrences in the literature of the period. The event and the martyrdom are considered historical by historians, although hagiographic accounts may sometimes be questioned.

=== Background ===
After the conquest of Cyprus by Richard the Lionheart from the Byzantine usurper Isaac Komnenos of Cyprus, he sold the island to Guy of Lusignan. After the establishment of the Kingdom of Cyprus, a Roman Catholic religious hierarchy was established alongside the pre-existing Orthodox hierarchy. Assisted by royal power and supported by successive popes, they embarked on a campaign of conversions, religious pressures, and power struggles targeting the Orthodox communities on the island.

They were aided by the forced exile of a large majority of Orthodox bishops from the island, usually leaving only the Orthodox monasteries, such as Machairas monastery and Kantara monastery, on the forefront to resist royal and papal authority.

Gregory IX was known as a particularly uncompromising and violent pope; in 1231, the same year as the death of the monks, he issued the bull Excommunicatus, confirming that the punishment for heretics was death.

=== Persecution and executions ===
Pope Gregory IX took measures to convert the island to Catholicism; he ordered that no position be given to anyone who did not recognize Latin practices. Subsequently, he sent a Dominican emissary to the island, Andrew, who carried out persecutions against the Orthodox population.

Between 1231 and 1233, a series of persecutions befell the Orthodox clergy of Cyprus. In particular, thirteen monks from the Kantara Monastery were persecuted for their refusal to use unleavened bread for the Eucharist. This element indicates that the main point of conflict was the liturgical question. They underwent an inquisition trial for heresy and were then imprisoned for three years by order of the high-court of the kingdom, composed of Frankish barons and Roman Catholic clergy.

The monks were subsequently tortured, at least once in public. One of them died during imprisonment and was not executed.

As they did not change their minds,Gregory IX directly instructed the Roman Catholic archbishop of the island, Eustorge of Montaigu, to consider them as heretics, they were then killed by being burned alive. The execution took place in May 1231. Their bones were then mixed with those of animals to avoid producing relics.

=== Consequences ===
The patriarch of Constantinople, Germanus II, sent a letter to Pope Gregory IX to highlight his and King Henry I of Cyprus's responsibility in the executions. The Pope replied that they were "schismatics" but agreed to backtrack on the issue of the use of unleavened bread.

The death of the martyrs served as a catalyst for popular resentment, which grew in magnitude and sought the rejection of the Latin authorities ruling the island and their Roman Catholic religious hierarchy. In particular, the narrative in the Narratio compares the Roman Catholic inquisitors to the high priests persecuting Jesus, Henry of Cyprus to Pontius Pilate, and the Dominican Andrew to Caiaphas. The persecutions served to strengthened the Orthodox position, becoming more steadfast in their beliefs.

Monasteries became the centers of Orthodox resistance on the island, and tensions remained violent and strained between the two communities until 1260 when Pope Alexander IV issued the Bulla Cypria. This sought a position of coexistence, although heavily favoring the Roman Catholic Church, and helped alleviate tensions to some extent.

== Legacy ==
The fact that certain Western Catholic researchers, such as Louis de Mas Latrie, avoided mentioning the event in their studies on the history of Cyprus, has been criticized in more recent studies, for example, by A. Nicolaou-Konnari.

The thirteen monks are considered as saints and martyrs in the Eastern Orthodox Church, particularly in the Church of Cyprus, where they are celebrated with a feast day on 19 May.
