= Hugh of Ibelin (died 1238) =

Crusader nobleman

Hugh the Strong
- Coat-of-arms of Ibelin.
- Born: c. 1213
- Died: 1238
- Noble family: House of Ibelin
- Father: John of Ibelin, the Old Lord of Beirut
- Mother: Melisende of Arsuf

Hugh of Ibelin (c. 1213 – 1238), called the Strong (French: Hue le Fort), was the third of five sons of John I of Beirut. He and his elder brother Balian were hostages at the court of Frederick II, Holy Roman Emperor, in 1228–1229. He led the first battaile at the Battle of Agridi in 1232 and thus withstood the brunt of the enemy charge. He was dead by 1238. In April 1239, Henry I of Cyprus had a mass said in his name at Nicosia.
