= Kantara Monastery =

Religious building in Cyprus

Coordinates: 35.384864°N 33.899123°E

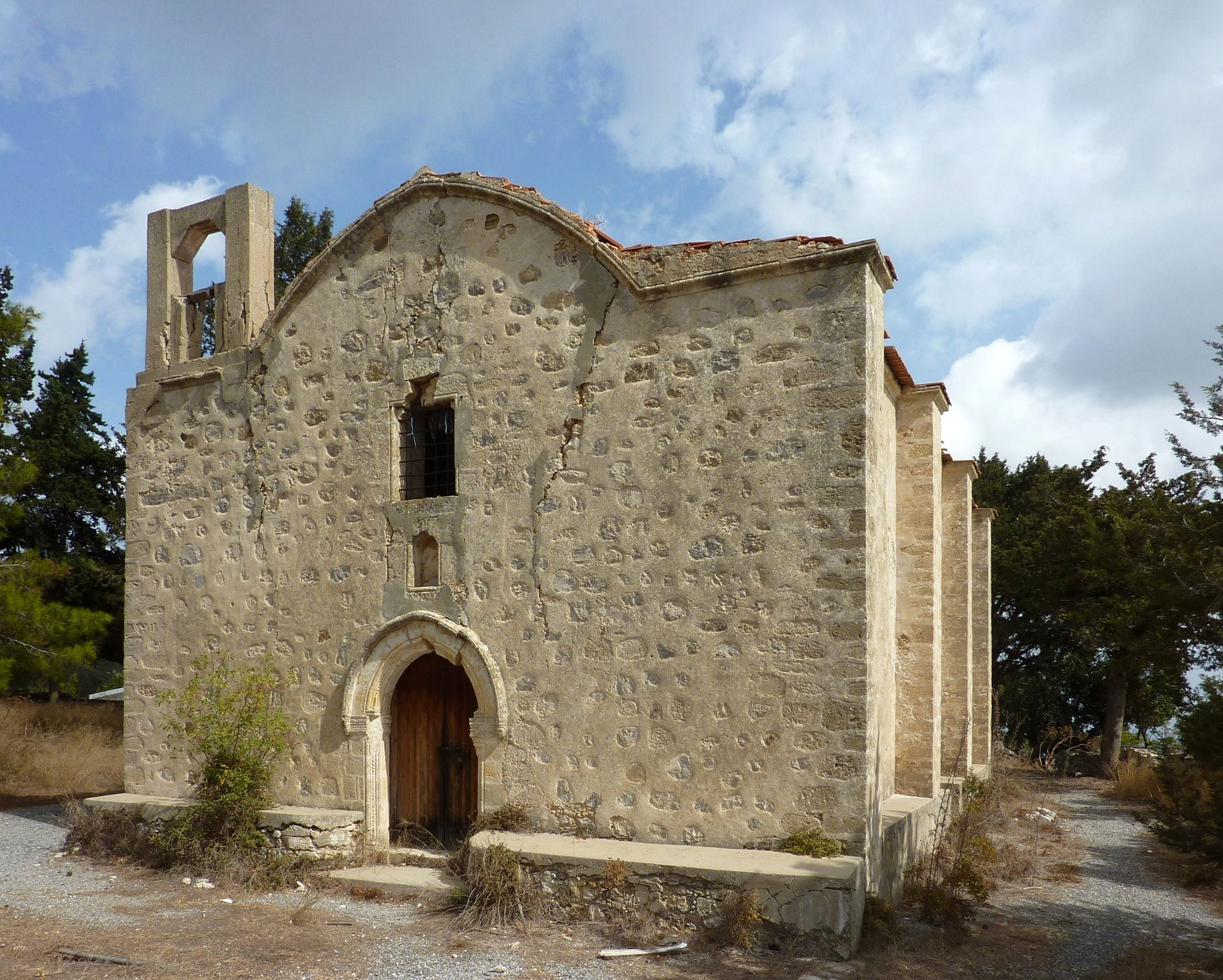
Panagia Kantariotissa of the Kantara monastery

Kantara Monastery (Greek: Μονή Καντάρας, or Greek: Ιερά Μονή Παναγίας Κανταριώτισσας) in Cyprus is dedicated to Panagia Kantariotissa, or Our Lady of Kantara. It lies on the southern slopes of the Northern Range at an altitude of 550 m (1,800 ft) near Kantara Castle, from which it took its name. The name is of Arabic origin.

== History ==
The monastery was probably established in the 11th or 12th centuries. It was first mentioned in the 13th century in connection to the martyrdom of its thirteen monks. In 1221 two monks, Ioannis and Konon came to Cyprus from Asia Minor. They eventually settled in Kantara, where they acquired fame and were joined by eleven other monks from Cyprus and elsewhere. It was at this period that the Latin Church tried to subjugate the Orthodox Church of Cyprus. The thirteen monks were accused of heresy, imprisoned in 1228 and finally burned at the stake on the riverbed of the Pedieos in Nicosia on 19 May 1231.

The monastery ceased to exist until probably the middle of the 17th century when Archbishop Nikiforos built a new monastery as it is testified by the icon of Panagia Kantariotissa painted by icon painter Leontion in that period. Later, Archbishop Chrysanthos completely rebuilt the church and its surrounding buildings in 1773. In 1783 Abbott Makarios commissioned Laurentios to paint the icons of the 'Iconostasis'. The monastery at this period thrived, it had 14 monks and sizable property in land and animals. It belonged to the diocese of the archbishopric.

It seems that the monastery declined by the mid-19th century and was finally abandoned, save a hermit called Symeon late in the 19th century. It was visited by George Jeffery in the 1910s describing it as a small monotholos church surrounded by monastic buildings.

Early in the 20th century, the monastic property was rented out to villagers, and minor repairs were made, including a bell tower. In 1925 a number of Famagustan families bought land from the monastery and with the help of the British District Commissioner, established a small mountain resort. Hence the church of the monastery became a 'parish church', celebrating every 15 August Our Lady's Assumption, as well as, on 19 May, the thirteen monks martyrdom.

On August 14, 1974 the Turkish Army captured Kantara. Soon all the icons were taken by smugglers and all furniture and fittings disappeared. Church Commissioner P. Ctorides had previously taken photos of each of the church icons. The church building now is in need of urgent repairs.
