= Philip of Montfort, Lord of Tyre =

Lord of Tyre (died 1270)

Philip Ι of Montfort (died 17 March 1270, Tyre) was lord of La Ferté-Alais and Castres-en-Albigeois 1228–1270, lord of Tyre 1246–1270, and lord of Toron aft. 1240–1270. He was the son of Guy of Montfort and Helvis of Ibelin.

The coat of arms of Monfort-Castres is the coat of arms of Monfort, with a label of four points azure.

== Life ==
At his father's death at the siege of Varilhes in the Albigensian Crusade in 1228, he succeeded to his French seigneuries. His first wife was Eleonore of Courtenay (d. bef. 1230), daughter of Peter II of Courtenay. Philip joined the party of his uncle, John of Ibelin, against the representatives of Frederick II. In 1244, he was created Constable of Jerusalem, but was subordinate to Walter IV of Brienne at the Battle of La Forbie. Philip was one of the few Christian knights to escape the disaster there. In 1246, Henry I of Cyprus, then Regent of Jerusalem, created him Lord of Tyre as a reward for his services to the baronial party. While the legality of this grant was somewhat dubious, it was recognized by Hugh I c. 1269; but Hugh reserved the right to buy back the fief.

Philip was married a second time, after 1240, to Maria of Antioch-Armenia, the elder daughter of Raymond-Roupen of Antioch and hence Lady of Toron and pretender of Armenia.

He joined the Seventh Crusade, and was employed as the ambassador of Louis IX of France in negotiations for a truce and retreat from Damietta. In 1256, he expelled the Venetians from Tyre, an action which helped to precipitate the War of St. Sabas. During that conflict, he attempted to relieve the Genoese in Acre in 1258, but was repulsed, which helped decide the struggle for the Venetians. In 1266, he lost Toron to the Sultan Baibars; but even in Philip's old age, Baibars feared both his energetic leadership and the possible success of his appeals to Europe for aid. In 1270, Philip was killed by an Assassin possibly in the employ of Baibars.

He was succeeded by his son Philip II in his French possessions, and by his son John of Montfort in Outremer.

== Children ==
From his first marriage to Eleonore of Courtenay:

- Philip ΙΙ of Montfort, Lord of Castres-en-Albigeois (d. September 24, 1270, Tunis), married Jeanne de Levis-Mirepoix

From his second marriage to Maria of Antioch-Armenia:

- John of Montfort, Lord of Toron and Tyre (c. 1240 – November 27, 1283, Tyre), married September 22, 1268 Margaret of Antioch-Lusignan
- Philippa de Montfort (d. 1282), married William, Lord of Esneval in Normandy
- Humphrey of Montfort, Lord of Toron and Tyre (d. February 12, 1284, Tyre), married c. 1270s Eschiva of Ibelin, Lady of Beirut
- Alix, living in 1282 and in 1295
- Helvis, living in 1282 and in 1295

== Sources ==
- Baldwin, Philip Bruce (2014). Pope Gregory X and the Crusades. The Boydell Press.
- de Boos, Emmanuel (2004). L'armorial le Breton: Centre historique des Archives nationales (France) (in French). Somogy editions d'art.
- Edbury, Peter W. (2001). "The De Montforts in the Latin East". In Prestwich, Michael; Britnell, R. H.; Frame, Robin (eds.). Thirteenth Century England VIII: Proceedings of the Durham Conference 1999. The Boydell Press.
- Hill, George (2010). A History of Cyprus, Volume 2. Cambridge University Press. ISBN 9781108020633.
- Powicke, Frederick Maurice (1967). Ways of Medieval Life and Thought: Essays and Addresses. Biblo and Tannen.
- Runciman, Steven (1951). A History of the Crusades. Vol. 3. Cambridge University Press.
