= Rupen of Montfort =

Cypriot noble

Rupen of Montfort (died 8 September 1313) was a Cypriot nobleman, the second surviving son of Humphrey of Montfort and Eschive d'Ibelin.

In 1299, Rupen married Marie d'Ibelin (d. aft. 1340), daughter of Balian of Ibelin, Seneschal of Cyprus. They had two children:

- Humphrey of Montfort, titular Lord of Beirut
- Jeanne of Montfort, married in 1322 Balian of Ibelin, son of Guy, Count of Jaffa.

His elder brother Amalric died in 1304, and Rupen succeeded him as titular Lord of Toron. In 1308, Rupen was involved in the abortive rebellion against Amalric, Lord of Tyre, who had usurped the royal power in Cyprus. He then left Cyprus to support his mother Eschive in an unsuccessful attempt to claim the Duchy of Athens, and took refuge from Prince Amalric on Rhodes. After the death of Amalric, Rupen returned to Cyprus and testified in the trial of the Knights Templar in 1311.

Upon Eschive's death in 1312, Rupen became titular Lord of Beirut. He died the following year and was buried in Nicosia. His son Humphrey succeeded him.

Titles in pretence
Preceded by Eschive d'Ibelin	— TITULAR — Lord of Beirut; 1312–1313; Reason for succession failure: Conquest by Bahri dynasty in 1291	Succeeded by Humphrey of Montfort
