= Buffavento Castle =

Castle in Cyprus

- Kάστρο Βουφαβέντο (Greek); Buffavento Kalesi (Turkish)
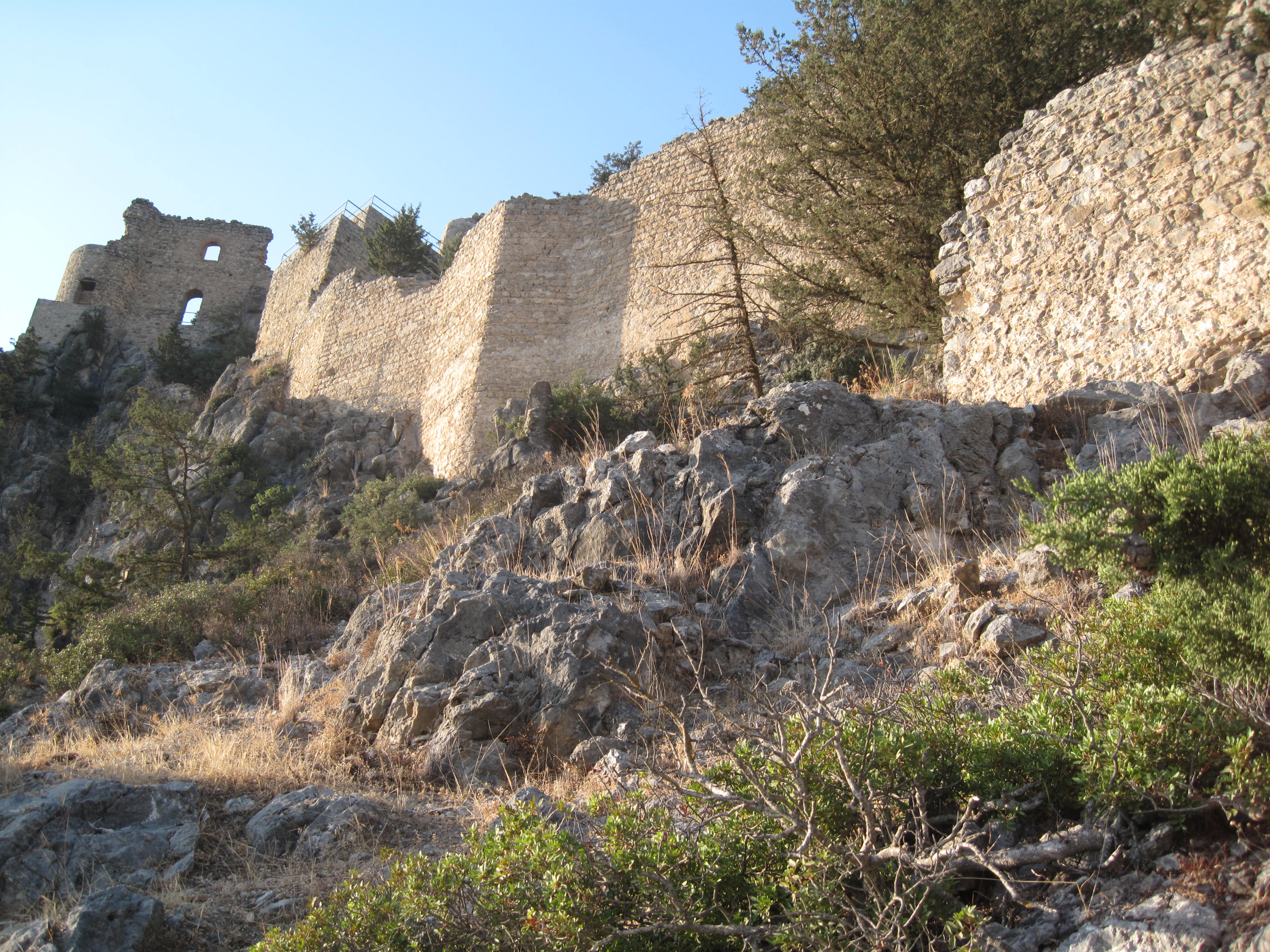
- Buffavento Castle

- Location within Cyprus

General information
- Location: De jure Cyprus; De facto Northern Cyprus
- Coordinates: 35°17′15″N 33°24′37″E

Buffavento Castle (Greek: Kάστρο Βουφαβέντο, Turkish: Buffavento Kalesi) is a castle in the largely unrecognised Turkish Republic of Northern Cyprus. The exact date of its construction remains unknown, the most plausible theory being the Byzantine period. It combines Byzantine and Frankish architectural elements. It fell into disuse in the 14th century.

== History ==
Buffavento Castle stands between Saint Hilarion Castle to the west and Kantara Castle to the east forming a protective axis in the Kyrenia Mountains of Northern Cyprus. Buffavento in particular guarded the mountain passage from Kythrea to the north coast. As the other castles are visible from Buffavento, it was used to pass signals between them. The castles were built in conjunction during the Byzantine period, however the exact date of their commission remains unknown. Noting the middle Byzantine (11th–12th century) architectural features present in the castle and the otherwise scarcity of archaeological evidence, D. M. Metcalf writes that "it is reasonable" to suggest that the castle was built with Saint Hilarion Castle as part of a major programme of works in the wake of the Seljuk advance in the late 11th century. Among the other theories put forward to explain their origin are: In 965 (after the expulsion of the Arabs from the island), in 1091 by the rebel Rhapsomates, during the rule of Eumathios Philokales (1091–1094), at the beginning of the 12th century as a countermeasure for the spread of the Crusader states. A Lusignan period legend claims that the castle was built by a Cypriot noblewoman who was seeking shelter from the Knights Templar in 1191, as such the castle was known as Leonne (Lion's Castle) or Queen's Castle. The name Buffavento is of Italian origin and means "Defier of the Winds", the name may have been borrowed from a monastery in the Koutzoventi village.

Serving mainly as a watchtower for pirate raids and a place of incarceration the castle saw next to no fighting. In 1191, it was taken by Richard the Lionheart during his campaign against the island's ruler Isaac Komnenos of Cyprus. Since the castle's defenses have been described as very strong it is believed that the defenders of Buffavento surrendered after Kantara and Saint Hilarion fell into English hands. Richard subsequently sold the island to the Knights Templar whose rule abruptly ended after a major revolt in Nicosia. Cyprus was then resold to Guy of Lusignan. A period of peace ended with the death of King Hugh I in 1218. A struggle over who should act as the kingdom's regent ensued, pitting the House of Ibelin with the local supporters of Emperor Frederick II. Frederick's arrival in Limassol in 1228 escalated the conflict into an open war. Between 1229 and 1233, it changed hands several times between the Ibelins and their rivals. Eschiva of Montbéliard defended it against the imperialist faction in 1232. Afterwards, the Lusignans continued their reign interrupted only by occasional palace coups. The castle was used as a prison in this period. For instance, it was documented that in 1308, a knight named Anseau of Brie was imprisoned at the Buffavento Castle when he heard of the accusations levelled against the Knights Templar in their trial.

In the 14th century, the island came under the control of the Republic of Venice, at which time the castle fell into disuse. In the early 19th century it was visited by Ali Bey el Abbassi.

== Architecture ==
Buffavento is situated at an elevation of 960 metres (3,150 ft) above sea level, and has approximately 600 steps leading up to it. The steep crags surrounding it make it inaccessible from the north, east and west. Many of the castle's buildings are irregular in shape, as the limited available space forced its builders to economize space. The main building material was dressed limestone from the island's coasts and stones taken directly from the mountain on which the castle stands. The architecture carries no signs of decoration. The castle is divided into two wards the upper one facing the sea and the lower one the plain. The wards were connected by a long staircase, which was later destroyed by the Venetians who deemed the fortifications redundant.

The castle's outbuildings consist of a big water cistern and a stable, which would have been rendered useless in the event of a siege. The castle's gates were inside a two storey rectangular tower, which encompassed a Frankish style pointed arch. To the west of the tower are three barrel vaulted buildings and recess all Frankish in origin. The buildings immediately behind the gate are three irregularly shaped chambers, the fourth building's ruins can be found nearby. The castle's main stairway then branches to the west leading to a two storey, unvaulted Byzantine building, which is divided into three large chambers. The castle's upper ward included a rectangular Byzantine cistern, interconnected with 4 rectangular wards containing pipes for collecting water. The upper ward's eastern side was guarded by a short, Frankish, groin vaulted tower. On its sides was the eastern cistern and a building that may have served as a church. At the extreme west of the castle stands a ruined, isolated tower. The lack of a kitchen or a food storage, points to the rooms being multifunctional.

== In popular culture ==
Buffavento Castle appears in the video game Assassin's Creed: Bloodlines.

== Gallery ==
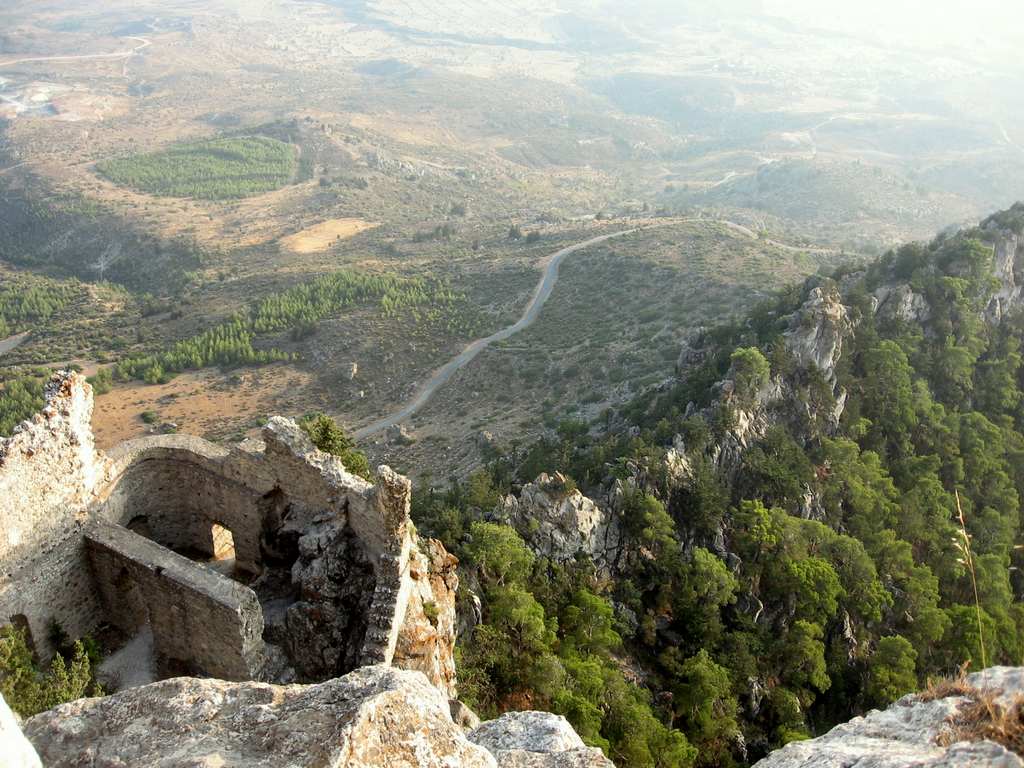
The castle

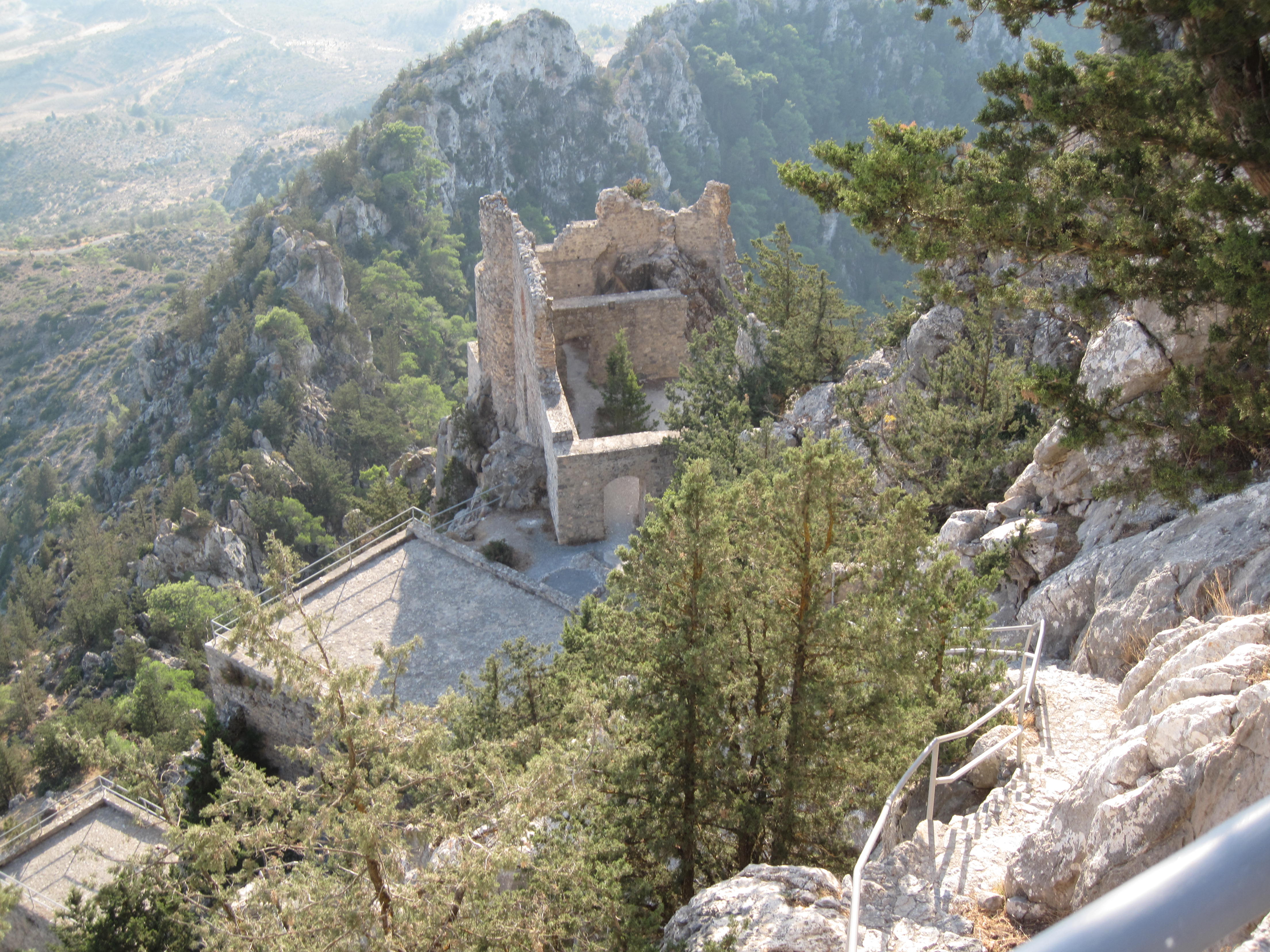

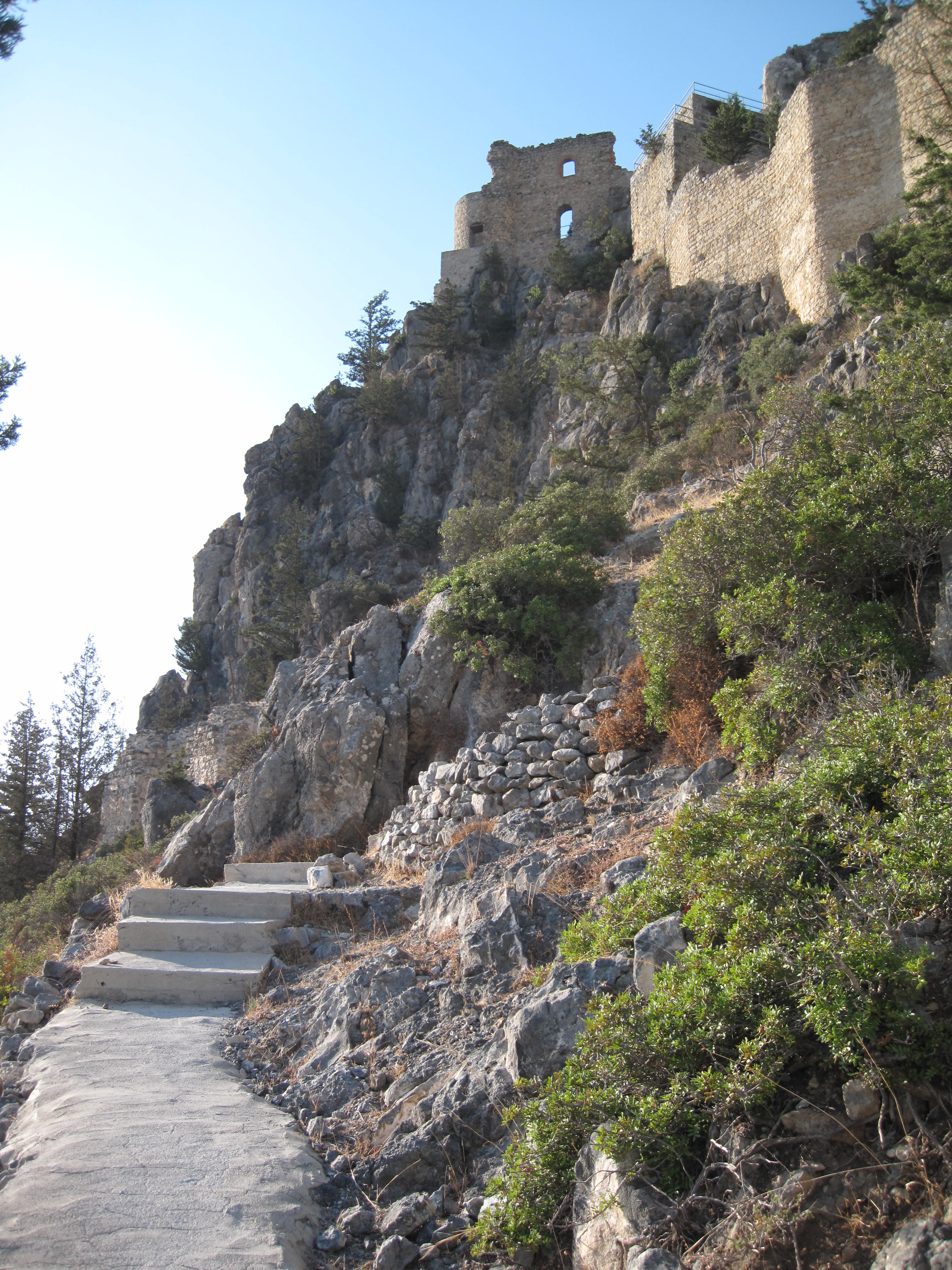

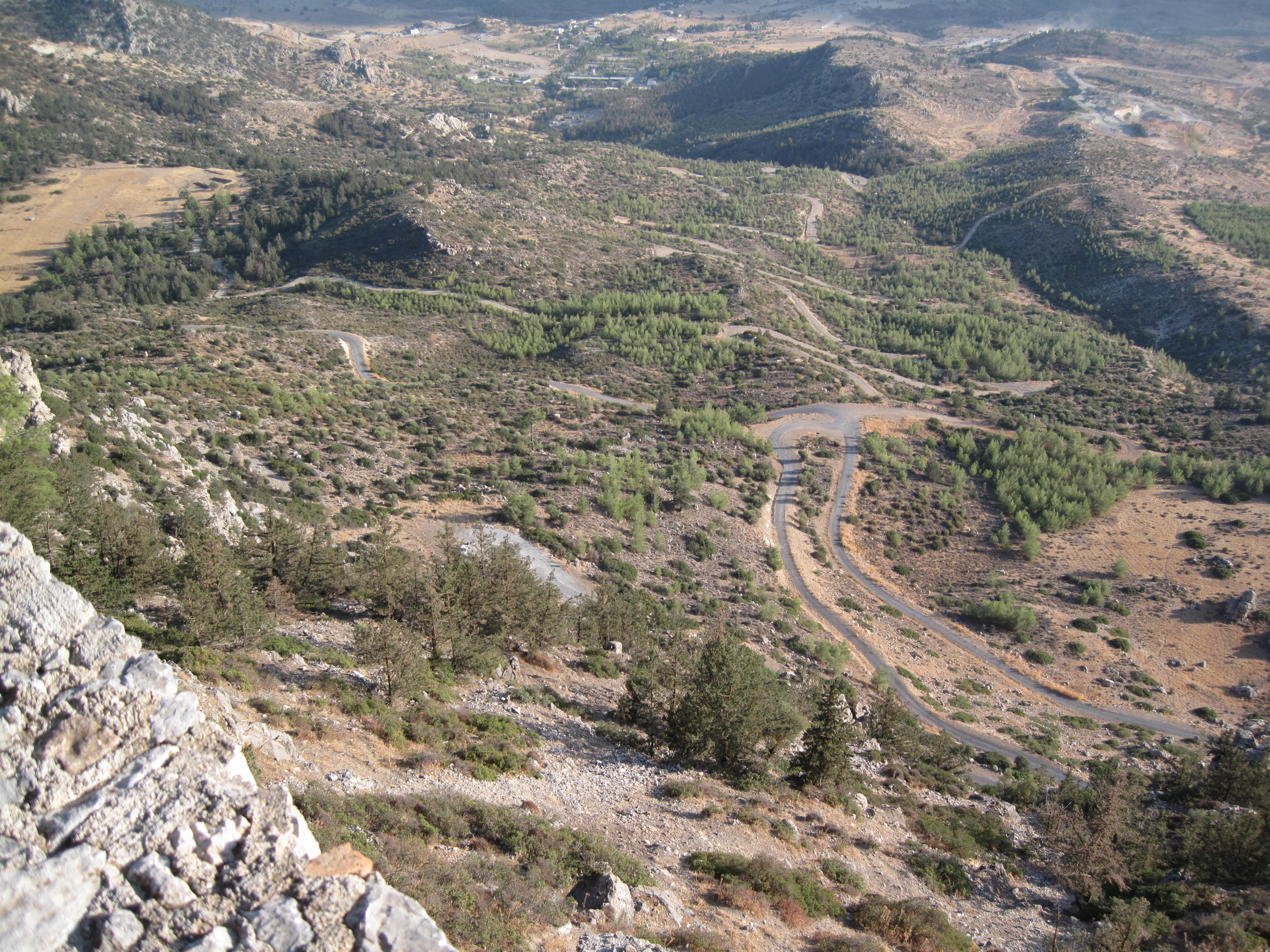

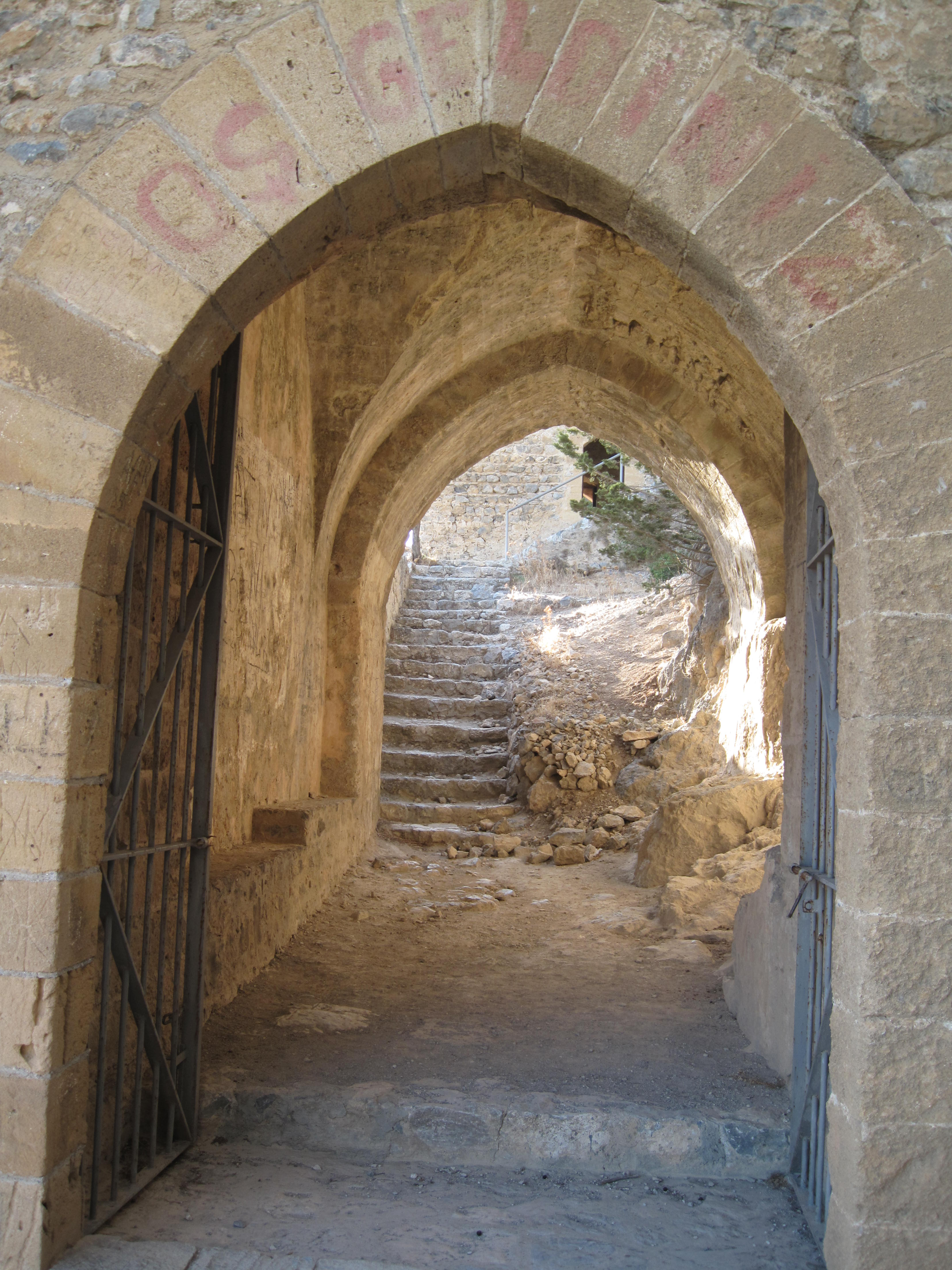

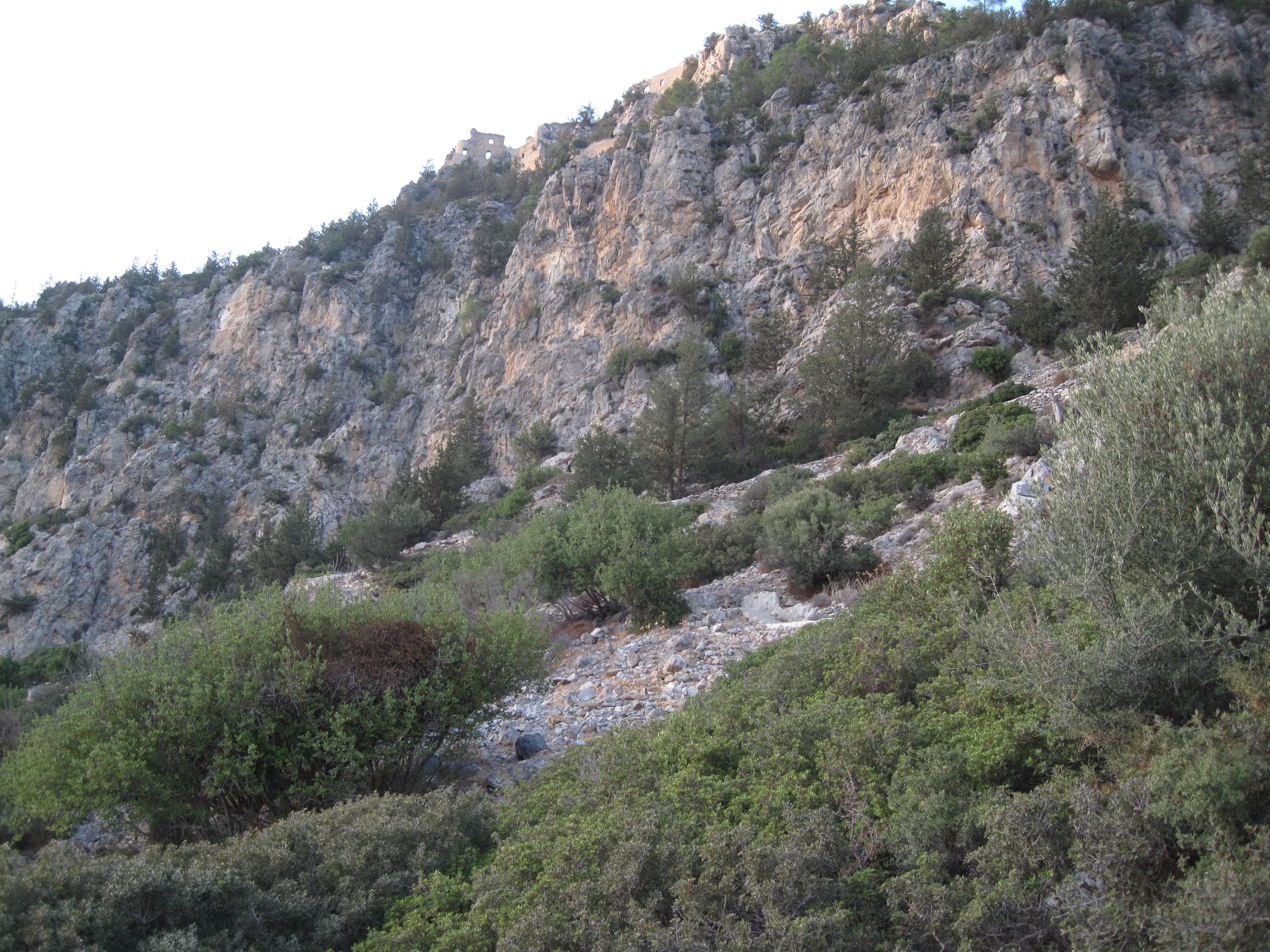

== See also ==
- List of Crusader castles
