= Melisende of Arsuf =

Lady of Arsuf in the Kingdom of Jerusalem

Melisende
- Lady of Arsuf and Beirut
- Born: before 1177
- Died: Unknown; Holy Land
- Spouses: Thierry d'Orca; John, Old Lord of Beirut
- Issue: Balian, Lord of Beirut; John, Lord of Arsuf; Raoul of Ibelin; Hugh of Ibelin; Baldwin, Seneschal of Cyprus; Guy, Constable of Cyprus; Isabelle of Ibelin
- Father: Guy, Lord of Arsuf
- Mother: Unknown

Melisende (born before 1177 – died after 1215) was the hereditary lady of Arsuf from 1177 and the second wife of the powerful nobleman John, Old Lord of Beirut.

== Life ==
She was born sometime before 1177, the eldest daughter of Guy, Lord of Arsuf. Her mother's name is unknown. She had a brother, Lord Jean, who married Helvis de Brie. When Jean died childless, Melisende inherited the lordship of Arsuf.

On an unknown date, Melisende married firstly Thierry d'Orca. In 1207, she married secondly John of Ibelin, lord of Beirut, former constable of Jerusalem, and regent in Acre for his half-niece Queen Maria.

Upon their marriage, Melisende passed the lordship of Arsuf to John, increasing his territory in the Kingdom of Jerusalem. Beirut was effectively autonomous state under his rule. After rebuilding the city which had been destroyed by the forces of Saladin, during the latter's conquest of the Crusader kingdom, Ibelin constructed a magnificent palace.

John of Ibelin and Melisende had six sons and one daughter:

- Balian of Ibelin (1210 – 4 September 1247 Askalon), in 1230, he married Eschiva de Montfaucon, daughter of Walter de Montfaucon de Montbéliard and Bourgogne de Lusignan of Cyprus.
- John of Ibelin (1212 – December 1258), Lord of Arsuf, Constable of Jerusalem. Married Alix of Caiphas, daughter of Rohart of Caiphas and Aiglantine of Nephim.
- Raoul of Ibelin
- Hugh of Ibelin (1213–1238)
- Baldwin of Ibelin, Seneschal of Cyprus, (died 21 February 1267)
- Guy of Ibelin, constable of Cyprus (c. 1215 – May 1255), married Philippa, daughter of Aimery Berlais.
- Isabelle of Ibelin, became a nun

== Sources ==
- Lignages d'Outremer, Marciana MS Francese 20, CCLXXXIX, p. 63
- Lock, Peter (2006). The Routledge Companion to the Crusades. Routledge.
- Roll, Israel; Tal, Oren (1999). Apollonia-Arsuf: The Persian and Hellenistic periods. Tel Aviv University Press.
- Women in Power (1150–1200)
