= Isabella, Lady of Beirut =

Isabella of Ibelin

Lady of Beirut
- Reign: 1264–1282
- Predecessor: John II
- Successor: Eschiva

Queen consort of Cyprus
- Reign: 1265–1267
- Born: 1252
- Died: 1282 (aged 29–30)
- Spouse: Hugh II of Cyprus; Hamo le Strange; Nicholas Aleman; William Barlais
- House: Ibelin
- Father: John II, Lord of Beirut
- Mother: Alice de la Roche

Isabella of Ibelin (1252–1282) was lady of Beirut from 1264 until her death in 1282, and was also queen of Cyprus. She was the daughter of John II of Beirut, lord of Beirut, and of Alice de la Roche sur Ognon.

== Life ==
Isabella was a member of the influential Ibelin family. Her maternal grandfather was the Duke of Athens, Guy I de la Roche. Upon her father's death, she inherited the Ibelin family palace in Beirut and the leadership of the fief. It was part of the Kingdom of Jerusalem but had an independent treaty from 1261 with Baibars, leader of the Mamluk Sultanate.

In 1265, the young Isabella was betrothed to the young Hugh II, king of Cyprus (1252–1267), but he died before the marriage was consummated. She then ruled independently, and as Lady of Beirut had friendly relations with the Mamluks, negotiating her own new 10-year truce with Baibars on May 9, 1269. She had an affair with the impetuous Julian of Sidon (d. 1275), and her "notorious lack of chastity" (possibly) prompted the official letter Audi filia et from Pope Clement IV, urging her to marry.

In 1272, at the age of 20, she married Haymo Létrange (the Foreigner), a wealthy lord from the Welsh Marches, a companion of the future English king Edward I, who was part of Lord Edward's crusade. The marriage was short though, as Haymo died in 1273. While on his deathbed, he put Isabella and Beirut under the unusual protection of Baibars.

King Hugh III of Cyprus wanted to use Isabella's status as a wealthy heiress to choose a new husband for her, to attract another distinguished knight to the fight in the Holy Land. Hugh forcibly took Isabella to Cyprus to arrange a new marriage, leaving her mother Alice de la Roche as regent of Beirut.

Isabella resisted and received the support of both Baibars and the Knights Templar. The matter was brought to the Jerusalem High Court and became a political dispute during the Crusades as to who had lordship over the lady of Beirut, Hugh or the Baibars. The High Court ruled in favor of Baibars, and Mamluk guards were assigned to Isabella's protection.

After Baibars's death in 1277, Isabella married twice more, to Nicolas l'Alleman, lord of Caesarea, and then to William Barlais (d. 1304).

Isabella was not known to have had any children, and upon her death in 1282 at the age of 30, the lordship of Beirut passed to her younger sister Eschiva (1253–1312).

Vassal titles
Preceded by John II	Lady of Beirut; 1264–1282 with Hugh II of Cyprus (1265–1267); Haymo Létrange (1272–1273); Nicolas l'Alleman (1276–1277); William Barlais (1278–1282)	Succeeded by Eschiva of Ibelin; Humphrey of Montfort
Royal titles
Preceded by Plaisance of Antioch	Queen consort of Cyprus; 1265–1267	Succeeded by Isabella of Ibelin
