= John of Montfort, Lord of Tyre =

13th-century knight

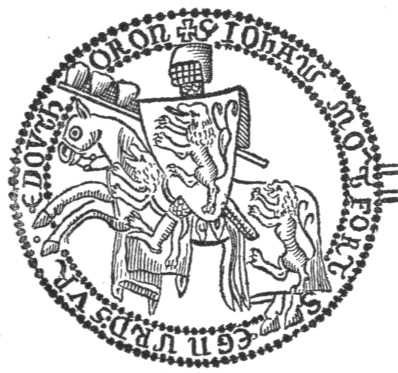
John of Montfort

John of Montfort (French: Jean; died 27 November 1283) was lord of Toron from 1257 to 1266 and Lord of Tyre from 1270 to 1283. He was the son of Philip of Montfort (lord of La Ferté-Alais, of Bréthencourt, of Castres, of Toron and of Tyre), and his second wife Maria of Antioch-Armenia (the elder daughter of Raymond-Roupen of Antioch and hence Lady of Toron and pretender of Armenia).

When he came of age, he received the lordship of Toron from his father, but the Mamluks conquered it in 1266. On 22 September 1268 he married Margaret, daughter of Henry of Antioch and of Isabella of Cyprus. Margaret was the sister of king Hugh III of Cyprus, who later became king of Jerusalem and negotiated a certain number of alliances with the nobility of the kingdom in order to shore up his pretence against Charles I of Sicily. On the occasion of this marriage, Hugh III confirmed Montfort's possession of Tyre but reserved the throne's right to retake the fiefdom if John and Margaret died without issue.

In 1270 his father was killed by the Assassins, and John succeeded to the lordship and governed Tyre until his death in 1283. He had no children, so Hugh III allowed Humphrey of Montfort to succeed his brother.

== Sources ==
- Baldwin, Philip Bruce (2014). Pope Gregory X and the Crusades. The Boydell Press.
- de Boos, Emmanuel (2004). L'armorial le Breton: Centre historique des Archives nationales (France) (in French). Somogy editions d'art.
- Edbury, Peter W. (2001). "The De Montforts in the Latin East". In Prestwich, Michael; Britnell, R. H.; Frame, Robin (eds.). Thirteenth Century England VIII: Proceedings of the Durham Conference 1999. The Boydell Press.
- Hill, George (2010). A History of Cyprus, Volume 2. Cambridge University Press. ISBN 9781108020633.
- Powicke, Frederick Maurice (1967). Ways of Medieval Life and Thought: Essays and Addresses. Biblo and Tannen.
- Runciman, Steven (1951). A History of the Crusades. Vol. 3. Cambridge University Press.
