= Hamo le Strange =

Hamo le Strange, Heimon Lestrange, Hamo L'Estrange or Hamo Extraneus (died late in 1272 or early 1273) was an English Crusader. His surname means the Foreigner. By marriage to Isabella of Beirut he was Lord of Beirut in the Kingdom of Jerusalem—he was the second of her four husbands.

== Early life ==
Hamo was the second son of the English knight John (III.) le Strange (died before March 1269) and his wife Lucy, daughter of Robert Tresgoz. He was a member of a powerful Anglo Norman Marcher family. He was lord of Ellesmere, Shropshire and during the De Montfort Rebellion was part of the entourage of Edward, Prince of Wales, later King Edward I.

== Crusading and Lordship of Beirut ==
In 1270, he left his lands to his younger brother Robert and joined Edward on the Ninth Crusade. Edward returned to Europe in 1272 after his father's death, leaving Hamo in the Kingdom of Jerusalem.

On 21 March 1272, Hamo married queen Isabella of Beirut (1252 - 1282/83), Lady of Beirut and daughter of John II of Beirut. She was the widow of Hugh II of Cyprus (died 1267).

Hamo's death was known in England by the end of April 1273 and so probably occurred late in 1272 or early in 1273.

On his deathbed Hamo put Isabella and the Lordship of Beirut under the protection of the Sultan of Egypt and Syria, Baibars. After Hamo's death, Hugh III of Cyprus tried to join Beirut to Cyprus by bringing Isabella to Cyprus to marry a man of his choosing, but Baibars cited Hamo's deathbed wish and prevented this. This move forced Isabella to return to Beirut in 1277, where she married Nicolas l’Aleman († 1277), Lord of Caesarea, and after his death William Barlais († 1305/06).

== Family connections ==
Hamo's sister Hawise Lestrange was married to the Welsh prince Gruffydd ap Gwenwynwyn, and their son Owen de la Pole married Hamo's niece Joan Corbet, daughter of Catherine Lestrange. Hamo's grandniece, Elizabeth Lestrange, married Lord Gruffydd ap Madog Fychan, of the princes of Powys Fadog, and was the mother of prince Gruffudd Fychan II and grandmother of Owain Glyndŵr, Prince of Wales. All three were members of the royal House of Powys.
