= Humphrey of Montfort =

Crusader

Humphrey of Montfort (died 12 February 1284) was a nobleman of the Kingdom of Jerusalem.

Humphrey was the second son of Philip of Montfort, Lord of Tyre by his second wife Maria of Antioch-Armenia, Lady of Toron.

On 1 October 1274, Humphrey married Eschive d'Ibelin (1253–1312), daughter of John d'Ibelin, Lord of Beirut and his wife Alice de la Roche sur l'Ognon. Their children were:

- three sons and a daughter, all of whom died young
- Amaury of Montfort (died 1304)
- Rupen of Montfort (died 1313)

In 1282, upon the death of his sister-in-law Isabella of Ibelin, Eschive succeeded her as lady of Beirut. When Humphrey's older brother Jean died in 1283, Humphrey was allowed to succeed to Jean's Lordship of Tyre by King Hugh III of Cyprus, who had a few years earlier confirmed the Montforts in their possessions of Tyre but reserved the right to re-take the fiefdom if Jean died without issue. However, upon Humphrey's death 6 months later, the new king Henry II retook the fiefdom (probably because he considered Humphrey's sons too young to guarantee the defence of Tyre) and granted it to his sister Margaret.

== Sources ==
- Edbury, Peter W. (2001). "The De Montforts in the Latin East". In Prestwich, Michael; Britnell, R. H.; Frame, Robin (eds.). Thirteenth Century England VIII: Proceedings of the Durham Conference 1999. The Boydell Press.

Regnal titles
Preceded by Isabella of Ibelin	Lord of Beirut; 1282–1284 with Eschive of Ibelin (1282–1284)	Succeeded by Eschive of Ibelin
