= War of the Lombards =

War in Levant (1228–1243)

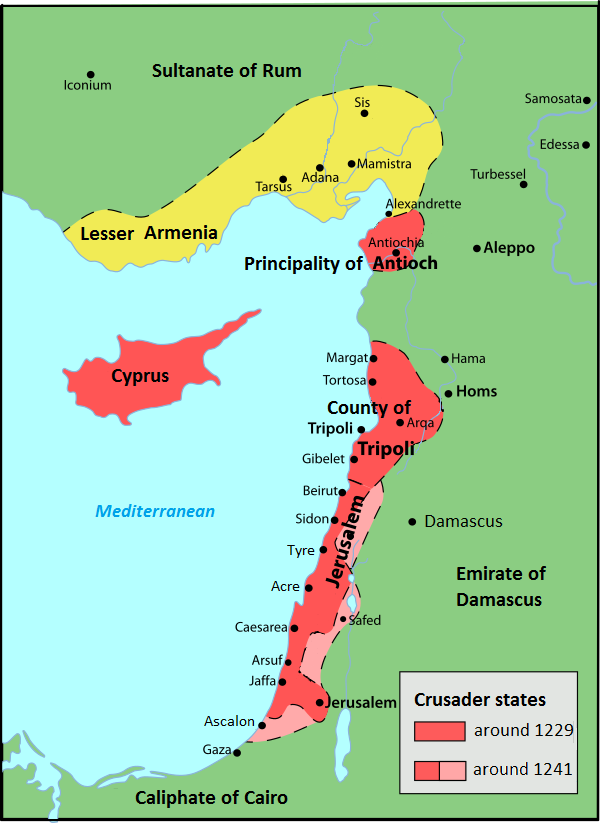
- Map of the Crusader states, 1240
Date	1228–1243
Location	Kingdom of Cyprus, Kingdom of Jerusalem
Result	Anti-imperial faction victory

Belligerents
Holy Roman Empire; Pro-Imperial faction in the Kingdom of Jerusalem: Tyre; Jerusalem; Principality of Antioch; County of Tripoli; Republic of Pisa; Knights Hospitaller; Teutonic Knights	Kingdom of Cyprus; Anti-Imperial faction in the Kingdom of Jerusalem: Acre; Beirut; Arsuf; Caesarea; Republic of Genoa; The Papacy

Commanders and leaders
Frederick II (surrendered); Richard Filangieri (surrendered)	Queen Alice of Cyprus; John of Ibelin; Philip of Montfort

The War of the Lombards (1228–1243) was a civil war in the Kingdom of Jerusalem and the Kingdom of Cyprus between the "Lombards" (also called the imperialists), the representatives of the Emperor Frederick II, largely from Lombardy, and the Eastern aristocracy led first by the Ibelins and then by the Montforts. The war was provoked by Frederick's attempt to control the regency for his son, Conrad II of Jerusalem. Frederick and Conrad represented the Hohenstaufen dynasty.

== Origins ==
Emperor Frederick II had been king of Jerusalem in right of his wife Isabella II until her death in 1228. He claimed suzerainty over Cyprus on the basis of King Aimery's oath of fealty to Emperor Henry VI. In 1228 Frederick arrived first at Cyprus, where he antagonised the nobles, and then at the Kingdom of Jerusalem, where he stayed until 1229, leaving in humiliating circumstances after having produced an anti-imperial reaction in the people. In 1231 he sent Richard Filangieri as his marshal. His attempt to assert his authority was opposed by John of Ibelin, the Old Lord of Beirut, who had been regent until Frederick's arrival. On John's death in 1236 the war was taken up by his son Balian. In 1239 Philip of Montfort assumed the leadership of the opposition.

Though the ecclesiastical hierarchy and the Knights Templar supported the nobility, the Teutonic Knights and Knights Hospitaller supported Filangieri. In general his rights as regent were recognised but his practical power was denied on the basis of the Assizes and the High Court. His headquarters were in Tyre and he had the allegiance of Bohemond V, who was the prince of Antioch and count of Tripoli. He also held the holy city of Jerusalem, which had been negotiated away from the Saracens by Frederick. So long as the Ibelins controlled the opposition, Filangieri could count on the support of their enemies as well. The Italian cities were also divided between the two factions: Pisa supported Filangieri and Genoa the Ibelins. The Ibelins controlled Beirut, Arsuf, and Caesarea as well as the old capital of Acre. In 1231 the citizens of Acre formed a commune with their headquarters at the church of Saint Andrew's to unify their opposition to Filangieri. In 1232 John of Ibelin was elected its mayor.

== Course ==
The first major battle of the war took place at Casal Imbert north of Acre in May 1232. Filangieri defeated the Ibelins. In June, however, he was so soundly defeated by an inferior force at the Battle of Agridi in Cyprus that his support on the island dwindled to nothing within a year.

In 1241, the barons offered the bailliage of Acre to Simon de Montfort, the Earl of Leicester, a cousin of Philip of Montfort, and a relative through marriage to both the Hohenstaufen and the Plantagenets. He never assumed it. In 1242 or 1243 Conrad declared his own majority and on 5 June the absentee monarch's regency was granted by the High Court to his grandaunt Queen Alice of Cyprus. Alice promptly began ruling as if monarch, ignoring Conrad, who was in Italy, and ordering Filangieri arrested. After a long siege, Tyre fell on 12 June. The Ibelins seized its citadel on 7 or 10 July, with the help of Alice, whose forces arrived on 15 June. Only the Ibelins could claim to be the winners of the war.

== Primary sources ==
The chief primary source for the War is Philip of Novara's The Wars of Frederick II Against the Ibelins, which is a highly partisan account favouring the Ibelins. Philip was an active participant in and eyewitness of many of the events he describes. In the 1240s he was handsomely rewarded in money and fiefs by Alice. His Wars is generally trusted but is contained in a later compilation called Les gestes des Chiprois, and it is sometimes difficult to determine if a detail was amended by the compiler. His account, written contemporaneously with events, only covers 1228–1233, 1236, and 1241–1242. He wrote the last part of his account between 1242 and 1247, adding interpolations until as late as 1258. It is Philip that gives the name Longuebars (Lombards) to the imperialists.

The Venetian baili Marsilio Zorzi, who arrived in Acre shortly before Alice's election as regent, wrote a report of conditions and recent events in the Levant for his masters in Venice. It is preserved in a manuscript of 1246 and in the fourteenth-century Liber Albus, but is a less precise, though more contemporaneous, account than Philip's.

Richard of San Germano presents a few details with regards to the beginning of Conrad's rule and the end of Frederick's regency that cannot be found elsewhere. According to him, Tommaso of Aquino, Count of Acerra, left for the Holy Land in June 1242 in connection with Conrad's assumption of power to be the King's representative in the East. He also mentions that Raymond VII of Toulouse met the Emperor at Melfi in September 1242 and intervened on behalf of the defeated Filangieri.
