= Eschiva of Ibelin, Lady of Beirut =

Lady of Beirut

Eschiva

Lady of Beirut
- Reign: 1282–1312
- Predecessor: Isabella of Beirut
- Successor: Rupen of Montfort
- Born: 1253
- Died: 1312 (aged 58–59)
- Noble family: House of Ibelin-Beirut
- Spouses: Humphrey of Montfort; Guy, Constable of Cyprus
- Issue: Rupen of Montfort; Hugh IV of Cyprus; Isabelle
- Father: John II of Beirut
- Mother: Alice de la Roche of Athens

Eschive d'Ibelin (1253–1312) was suo jure Lady of Beirut from 1282 to 1312. She was the daughter of John II of Beirut (died 1264), lord of Beirut, and Alice de la Roche (died 1282), and a member of the influential Ibelin family.

== Early life ==
Eschive d'Ibelin married Humphrey de Montfort, lord of Tyre in 1274.

They had:

- Three sons and one daughter, all who died young
- Amaury de Montfort (died 1304)
- Rupen de Montfort (died 1313)

== Lady of Beirut ==
She became Lady of Beirut on the death of her sister Isabelle of Beirut in 1282, holding the title in her own right. Isabelle had no surviving children.

Humphrey died in 1284. In 1291 Eschive married Guy of Lusignan, constable of Cyprus (died 1302).

They had:

- Hugh IV (1295–1359) king of Cyprus, married firstly Maria of Ibelin, then Alice of Ibelin
- Isabelle de Lusignan (born 1298), who in 1322 married Eudes de Dampierre (died 1330)

In 1291, Emir ‘Alam al-Din Sanjar al-Shuja‘i al-Mansuri, a Muslim general under al-Ashraf Khalil, marched on Beirut, which had only a small garrison. Eschive thought she was secure because she had signed a truce with Qalawun, father of Khalil. Al-Shuja‘i summoned the commanders of the garrison and arrested them. Seeing the commanders arrested, the population fled by sea. Beirut was taken by the Muslim forces on July 31. Al-Shuja‘i ordered the razing of its walls and castles and turned its cathedral into a mosque.

== Claimant to the Duchy of Athens ==
In 1308, Eschive's cousin Guy II de la Roche, Duke of Athens, died without issue, leaving a succession crisis in the duchy. Eschive travelled to the Morea in the same year to claim her rights to the duchy of Athens. She was one of the two claimants, as the daughter of Guy's aunt Alice; her rival, Walter V of Brienne, was the son of Guy's aunt Isabella, a younger sister of Alice. Upon her return journey from Morea, Eschive was shipwrecked.

Since Athens was a fief of the Principality of Achaea, the decision was in the hands of Philip I of Taranto, Prince of Achaea, and his suzerain and elder brother Robert of Naples. The two referred the question to the High Court of Achaea in 1309, which met at Glarentza and declared Walter the heir on the pragmatic grounds that he was male and an active soldier, better suited to defend the Duchy.

The disappointed Eschive thereupon appealed to the Virgin Mary before the altar of St Francis at Glarentza, asking that Walter and the judges die without heirs of the body if they had wrongly judged against her. Eschive outlived Walter, who was killed at the Battle of Halmyros in 1311, but died the following year in Nicosia and was buried there.

== Sources ==
- Edbury, Peter W. (1994). The Kingdom of Cyprus and the Crusades, 1191-1374. Cambridge University Press.
- Edbury, Peter W. (2001). "The De Montforts in the Latin East". In Prestwich, Michael; Britnell, R. H.; Frame, Robin (eds.). Thirteenth Century England VIII: Proceedings of the Durham Conference 1999. The Boydell Press.
- Miller, William (1908). The Latins in the Levant: A History of Frankish Greece (1204–1566). London: J. Murray. pp. 220–221.

Regnal titles
| Preceded by Isabella of Ibelin | Lady of Beirut; 1282–1291 with Humphrey of Montfort (1282–1284); Guy of Cyprus (1291) | Vacant Conquest by Al-Ashraf Khalil Title next held by Rupen de Montfort as claimant |
