= Philip of Novara =

13th-century Italian historian, warrior, musician, diplomat, poet, and lawyer

Philip of Novara (c. 1200 – c. 1270) was a medieval historian, warrior, musician, diplomat, poet, and lawyer born at Novara, Italy, into a noble house, who spent his entire adult life in the Middle East. He primarily served the Ibelin family, and featured in a number of prominent battles and negotiations involving Jerusalem and Cyprus. He chronicled the War of the Lombards, the dispute between the Ibelin family and Frederick II, Holy Roman Emperor.

He wrote a lengthy treatise on the feudal law of Jerusalem, which influenced later jurists like John of Ibelin.

== Works ==
- Des quatre âges de l'homme: traité de moral de Philippe de Novare, ed. Marcel de Freville. Paris: Didot, 1888.
- Philip of Novara, The Wars of Frederick II against the Ibelins in Syria and Cyprus, trans. John L. La Monte. New York: Columbia University Press, 1936.
- Philip of Novara. Guerra di Federico II in Oriente (1223–1242), ed. and Italian trans. Silvio Melani. Naples: Liguori, 1994.
- Philip of Novara, Le Livre de forme de plait, ed. and trans. Peter W. Edbury. Nicosia: Cyprus Research Centre, 2009.

== Bibliography ==
- Peter W. Edbury. "Philip of Novara and the Livre de forme de plait." Praktika tou tritou diethnous kyprologikou sunedriou (Lefkosia, 16-20 Apriliou 1966), vol. 2, ed. A. Papageorgiou (Nicosia: Etaireia Kupriakon Spoudon, 2001), pp. 555–69.
- Serena Modena, Schede di Filippo da Novara http://www.rialfri.eu/rialfriWP/autori/filippo-di-novara, Guerra di Federico II in Oriente https://web.archive.org/web/20160304032052/http://www.rialfri.eu/rialfriWP/opere/guerra-di-federico-ii-in-oriente, Livre de forme de plait http://www.rialfri.eu/rialfriWP/opere/livre-de-forme-de-plait, in RIALFrI (Repertorio Informatizzato dell'Antica Letteratura Franco-Italiana) http://www.rialfri.eu/rialfriWP/
