= John, Old Lord of Beirut =

Crusader nobleman (c. 1179–1236)

John
- Constable and Regent of Jerusalem

Lord of Beirut
- Successor: Balian of Beirut
- Born: c. 1179
- Died: 1236
- Noble family: House of Ibelin
- Spouses: Helvis of Nephin; Melisende of Arsuf
- Issue: Balian, Lord of Beirut; John, Lord of Arsuf; Hugh the Strong; Baldwin, Seneschal of Cyprus; Guy, Constable of Cyprus; Isabella
- Father: Balian of Ibelin
- Mother: Maria Comnena

John of Ibelin (c. 1179 – 1236), called the Old Lord of Beirut, was a powerful crusader noble in the 13th century, one of the best known representatives of the influential Ibelin family. The son of Balian of Ibelin and the dowager queen Maria Comnena, he had close ties with the nobility of both Cyprus and Jerusalem, since he was the half-brother of Queen Isabella I of Jerusalem. Before he was 20, he was appointed constable of Jerusalem, and a few years later became Lord of Beirut. John rebuilt Beirut after Saladin's conquest, and established the grand Ibelin family palace. He served as regent of Jerusalem on behalf of his niece Maria of Montferrat from 1205 to 1210 after her mother, Queen Isabella, died. He was also regent for his great-nephew (Isabella's grandson) Henry I of Cyprus from 1228 until Henry came of age in 1232. John was known as a principled man, and was seen as the natural leader of the Christian barons in the Holy Land. He resisted the power-seeking of Frederick II, Holy Roman Emperor, in Cyprus, and opposed the imperial forces until King Henry came of age.

== Early years ==
John was the son of Balian, Lord of Nablus and Ibelin, and Maria Komnene, Queen of Jerusalem, widow of Amalric of Jerusalem. By 1198 he had become constable of Jerusalem; the fact that he was the half-brother of Isabella, Queen of Jerusalem gave him considerable influence. At the time he was a vassal of Ralph of Saint-Omer, who was exiled from the kingdom after being accused of attempting to assassinate King Aimery of Cyprus. John attempted to mediate, but Aimery would not back down.

== Lord of Beirut ==
Sometime before 1205, John relinquished the office of constable in exchange for the lordship of Beirut, which became the home of the Ibelin family for the rest of the century. He rebuilt the city, which had been completely destroyed during Saladin's conquest of the Kingdom of Jerusalem. He also constructed an opulent palace with art of both Muslim and Byzantine influences. A German ambassador in 1212, Wilbrand of Oldenburg, wrote an impressive account of the castle, describing fresco paintings, mosaics on the floors, and a marble fountain in the courtyard. Historian Peter Edbury described the ambassador's account as "A feature of the public rooms were the Trompe-l'œil effects achieved with marble inlays, with a floor resembling the sea and a ceiling 'painted with such life-like colours that clouds pass across, the west wind blows, and there the sun seems to mark out the year and the months, the days and the weeks, the hours and the moments by its movement in the zodiac. A marble fountain with a dragon as the centre-piece stood in the central hall, its jets cooling the air and the murmur of the water giving an altogether soothing effect." Beirut Castle was so well fortified that in 1231 and 1232 it withstood a siege lasting several months.

Beirut was effectively an independent state under John's rule; in 1207 John added Arsuf to his territory through his marriage to Melisende of Arsuf, making him one of the wealthiest nobles in the kingdom.

== Regent ==
From 1205 to 1210 John served as regent in Acre –which became the new capital of the Kingdom of Jerusalem– for Maria of Montferrat the daughter of Queen Isabella I. As regent, John helped arrange the marriage of Aimery II's son Hugh I of Cyprus to Alice of Champagne, daughter of Aimery's predecessor as King of Jerusalem, Henry II of Champagne. In 1210 he also helped arrange Maria of Montferrat's marriage to John of Brienne, who was suggested by King Philip II of France.

By 1217 John and his brother Philip of Ibelin had become involved in the politics of the Kingdom of Cyprus as well. They had apparently alienated themselves from John of Brienne, but the two represented Cyprus at a council in Acre, which met to plan for the arrival of the Fifth Crusade. When Hugh I died in 1218, Philip became regent for Hugh's son Henry I of Cyprus, Philip's nephew. When Philip died in 1228, John took over the same office. Although both Philip and John were closely related to Henry I, as his uncles, they were still opposed on Cyprus by supporters of the Lusignan family, of which Henry was also a member; his grand-uncle Guy of Lusignan, and grandfather Aimery, were the first two kings of Cyprus.

== Battle for Cyprus ==
In 1228, the power struggle was amplified when Holy Roman Emperor Frederick II arrived in Cyprus on the Sixth Crusade. Frederick was connected to the Jerusalem nobles by being married to Isabella II, John of Brienne's daughter, and Frederick attempted to use this to take power. He claimed the kingship of Jerusalem and the overlordship of Cyprus, as well as John of Ibelin's lordship of Beirut, which John refused. When lured to a banquet and then confronted with Frederick's armed guards, John was forced to hand over the regency, and Cyprus, to Emperor Frederick's control, under Aimery Barlais. However, this was temporary, as John later resisted with military force. After Frederick departed from the island in April, John's forces defeated the remaining imperial bailiffs in a battle outside Nicosia on July 14, 1229, thus beginning the War of the Lombards. Frederick sent an army in 1231, under the marshal of the Empire, which attempted to invade Cyprus. John repelled the invasion at the Battle of Agridi, but the imperial fleet sailed to John's power center of Beirut, which they besieged and almost captured. The imperial marshal, Richard Filangieri, was able to establish himself in Jerusalem and Tyre, which he had regained by treaty in 1229, but not in Beirut or the capital in Acre.

In Acre, John's supporters formed a commune, of which John himself was elected mayor when he arrived in 1232. The Commune of Acre relieved the siege of Beirut, but in John's absence from Cyprus, the supporters of the Lusignans took control. In any case, Henry I of Cyprus came of age in the same year, and John's regency was no longer necessary. When Henry I succeeded to the throne, both John and Riccardo immediately raced back to Cyprus, where the imperial forces were defeated in battle on June 15. Henry became the undisputed king of Cyprus, and since he supported the Ibelins over the Lusignans, John's family remained influential.

Conflict continued, as Filangieri remained in control of Jerusalem and Tyre, and had the support of Bohemond IV of Antioch, the Teutonic Knights, the Knights Hospitaller, and the Pisan merchants. John, was supported by his nobles on Cyprus, and in his continental holdings in Beirut, Caesarea, and Arsuf, as well as by the Knights Templar and the Genoese merchant community. Neither side could make any headway, and in 1234 Pope Gregory IX excommunicated John and his supporters. This was partly revoked in 1235, but still no peace could be made.

In the last year of his life, John of Ibelin, as did many other elderly barons, joined the order of the Knights Templar, so that he could die as a Templar. His family was opposed to this, but John insisted, and was honored with a grand funeral in Acre in 1236.

== Family ==
John was married twice. His first wife, in 1201/1202, was Helvis of Nephin. Little is known of the marriage except that the couple had five sons, all of whom died before Helvis died.

In 1207, John married Melisende, Lady of Arsuf, with whom he had five sons and a daughter:

- Balian of Beirut (d. 1247), who succeeded him as Lord of Beirut, and fathered John II of Beirut
- John of Arsuf (c. 1211–1258), lord of Arsuf and constable of Jerusalem, father of Balian of Arsuf (1239–1277)
- Hugh of Ibelin (died 1238)
- Baldwin of Ibelin, Seneschal of Cyprus
- Guy of Ibelin, Constable of Cyprus
- Isabella, who became a nun
