= Lordship of Beirut =

Holding in the Kingdom of Jerusalem

The Lordship of Beirut was a feudal seigneury in the Kingdom of Jerusalem centered on the city of Beirut (in modern-day Lebanon). The lord of Beirut was one of the most powerful vassals of the king of Jerusalem. In the 12th century the lordship was ruled by the Brisebarre family. At some point between 1165 and 1174, Beirut was taken back into the royal domain. Count Raymond III of Tripoli held it in 1185-86, and in 1187, it was conquered by the Ayyubids. It was recovered in 1197, and in the 13th century the lordship was held by the Ibelin family.

== History ==
=== First kingdom ===
The city of Beirut was captured by the Franks and annexed to the Kingdom of Jerusalem in 1110. King Baldwin I granted it to his distant relative Fulk of Guînes. By 1125, Fulk had died, and Beirut had been given to Walter I Brisebarre. The origin of the Brisebarre family is unknown: their name does not refer to any place and no relationship with the counts of Guînes is known.

Beirut owed 21 knights to the crown, making it one of the greatest fiefs of the kingdom. The Lordship of Banias, established in 1128, and the Lordship of Chastel Neuf, were sub-fiefs of the Lordship of Beirut. According to the historian Mary E. Nickerson, the lordship extended from the Nahr al-Kalb at the kingdom's border with the County of Tripoli to the Damour river and from the Lebanon Mountains to the sea. This is the prevailing view in the 20th-century historiography. The historian Steven Tibble dismisses it as "assumptions that are either not supported or directly contradicted by charter evidence". The lordship contained a lucrative port.

Sometime between 1164 and 1167 the lord of Beirut, Walter III Brisebarre, was forced to cede the lordship to King Amalric to pay for the ransom he owed to his former Muslim captors. In 1185, Count Raymond III of Tripoli, acting as regent for the minor King Baldwin V, was granted Beirut to defray the costs of the regency. When the young king died, Joscelin of Courtenay swiftly seized Beirut and other towns for Queen Sibylla. The right to Beirut was then disputed between Raymond and King Guy.

=== Second kingdom ===
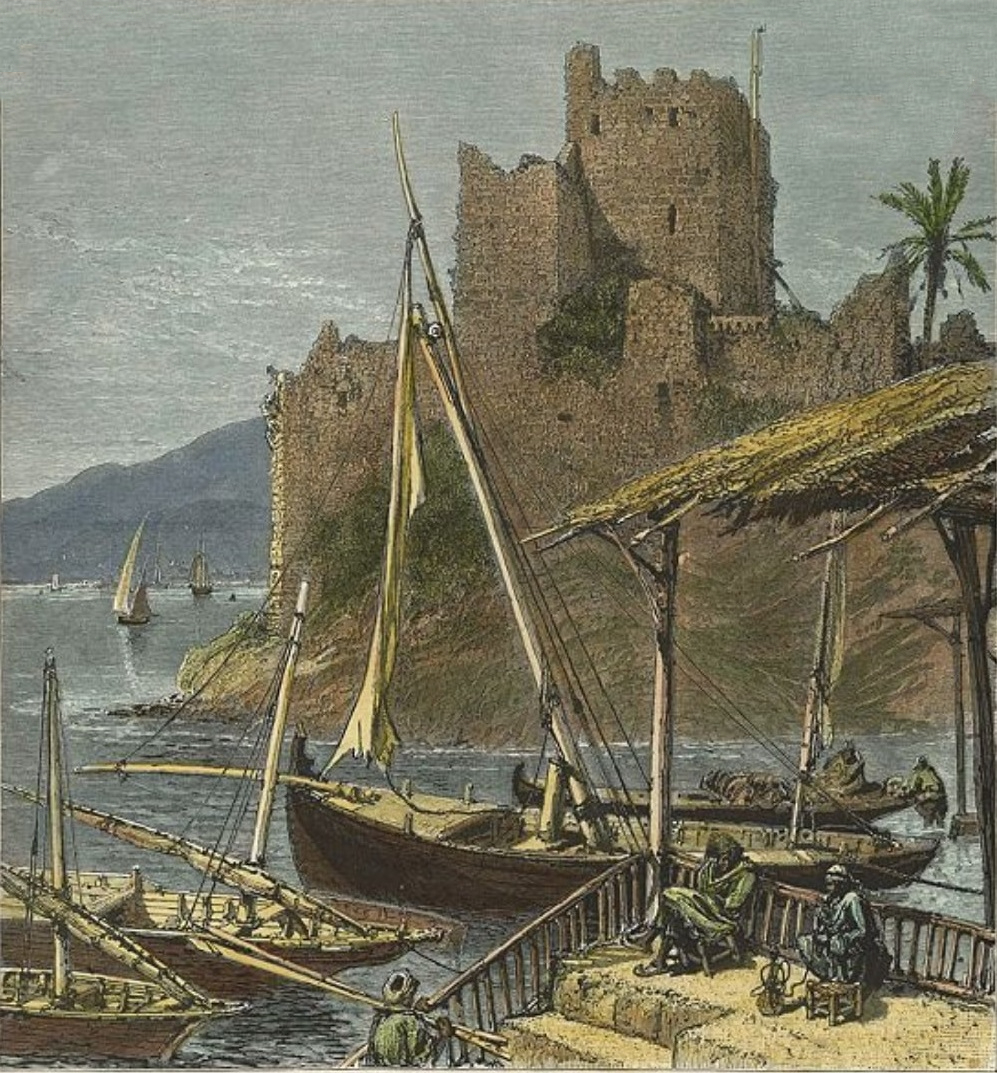
The Beirut Castle

Beirut was conquered by the Muslims along with most of the kingdom in 1187. In 1197, it was recovered by the Christians. Queen Isabella I granted the lordship to her half-brother John, of the Ibelin family. Around 1207 John acquired the Lordship of Arsuf through marriage with its lady, Melisende. Henceforth two coastal lordships were held by close relatives of the royal family. By the 13th century at the latest, the lordship consisted of only a strip of coast around the city of Beirut. Tibble argues that the lordship encompassed very little agricultural land, and that "the vast majority" of the lord's revenue came from urban trade.

In the 13th century the lord of Beirut held numerous properties in the royal domain, especially in the vicinity of Acre. The most prominent vassals of the lord of Beirut were the Mimars family. Emperor Frederick II, as king of Jerusalem, tried to take Beirut back in the royal domain in 1228. King Hugh I granted substantial property to the lord of Beirut, Balian of Ibelin, noting that this was in expansion of the lordship. In 1256, the lord of Beirut, John of Ibelin, leased most of his estate to the Teutonic Knights in order to alleviate his financial hardships. The Franks permanently lost Beirut, as well as all the remaining land of the kingdom, to the Muslim ruler of Egypt, Al-Ashraf Khalil, in 1291.

== Lords ==
- Fulk of Guînes, lord from 1110 to sometime between 1117 and 1125

Brisebarre succession according to Mayer
- Walter I Brisebarre, 1117/25–1132/34
- Guy Brisebarre the Elder, 1133/34–1143
- Walter I Brisebarre, 1144–1145
- Guy Brisebarre the Elder, 1145/47–1156/57
- Walter II Brisebarre, 1156/57–c. 1166

Brisebarre succession according to Nickerson
- Walter I Brisebarre, 1125–1126
- Guy I Brisebarre, 1127–1140
- Walter II Brisebarre, 1140–1147
- Guy II Brisebarre, 1147–1156
- Walter III Brisebarre, 1156–1166

Mary E. Nickerson posited a succession of the Brisebarre lords in which every appearance of a Walter or Guy was assumed to represent a new individual. This remained the dominant view through much of the 20th century. Hans E. Mayer argued that Nickerson's Walter I and Walter II are the same person, who lost and regained the lordship, and that only one Guy held the lordship, also being dispossessed and reinstated. Mayer thus names the last Brisebarre lord Walter II rather than Walter III. This interpretation is embraced by Alan V. Murray.

- Andronikos Komnenos, who briefly held the lordship in 1167

From 1167 until 1187 Beirut was held by the king. Muslims held it from 1187 to 1197. It was back in Frankish possession from 1197 to 1291. The proprietary lords and ladies in this period were:

- John I of Ibelin, c. 1205–1236
- Balian of Ibelin, 1236–1247
- John II of Ibelin, 1247–1264
- Isabella of Ibelin, 1264–1282
- Humphrey of Montfort, 1282–1284
- Eschiva of Ibelin, 1282–1291
