= 2017 in games =

This page lists board and card games, wargames, miniatures games, and tabletop role-playing games published in 2017. For video games, see 2017 in video gaming.

== Games released or invented in 2017 ==
- The 7th Continent
- Azul
- Bärenpark
- Bears vs. Babies
- Charterstone
- Civilization: A New Dawn
- Dark Souls: The Board Game
- Escape the Dark Castle
- Feudum
- Gaslands
- Gloomhaven
- Legend of the Five Rings: The Card Game
- Near and Far
- Planetarium
- Spirit Island
- Werewords

== Game awards given in 2017 ==
- Great Western Trail won the Spiel Portugal Jogo do Ano.

== Significant game-related events in 2017 ==
- On December 26, Steve Jackson announced he had re-acquired rights to The Fantasy Trip products he authored for Metagaming, specifically Melee, Wizard, Death Test, Death Test 2, Advanced Melee, Advanced Wizard, In the Labyrinth, and Tollenkar's Lair.

== Deaths ==
Date	Name	Age	Notability
February 14	Loren Wiseman	65	Game designer and co-founder of Game Designers' Workshop
March 22	Daisuke Satō	52	Game designer
April 27	Richard Tucholka	63	Game designer and co-founder of Tri Tac Games
June 14	Rob Gonsalves	57	Artist who contributed to Magic: The Gathering
June 22	Stewart Wieck	49	Game designer and co-founder of White Wolf Publishing
June 24	Tom Kremer	87	Game designer

== See also ==
- List of game manufacturers
- 2017 in video gaming
