= Guy Brisebarre the Younger =

Guy Brisebarre the Younger (fl. 1157–1182) was a nobleman of the Frankish Levant, a younger son of the Brisebarre family. He is known in contemporary documents and in the late 13th-century Lignages d'Outremer as Guy of Beirut (Latin: Guido de Barrito, French: Gui de Baruth).

Guy was the second son of Guy Brisebarre the Elder, lord of Beirut, and thus a younger brother of Walter II and older brother of Bernard. He first appears in the historical record for 1157, after his father's death, when, with his brothers, he confirmed the grant of the castle of Banias, a fief of Beirut, to the Knights Hospitaller. He was still a minor, specifically a puer, in 1159. He never held the lordship of Beirut, however. For this reason, the historian Hans Eberhard Mayer avoids using numbering ("Guy II" or "Guy III"), preferring "Guy the Younger".

Guy's mother was named Mary. In the early 1160s, Guy, Walter and Bernard were captured by the Saracens. Their mother raised a partial ransom and gave herself up as a hostage for the rest to secure her sons' release. This took place sometime between 1164 and 1167. According to the Annales ianuenses, it was the "lords of Beirut" who assassinated Miles of Plancy in October 1174. This is probably a reference to Walter and Guy, neither of whom was in fact lord of Beirut at the time, but both of whom had reason to dislike Miles as a beneficiary of their misfortune. Whether or not they were guilty, there was never any attempt to try them.

Guy married Juliana Grenier, the sister of Walter II, lord of Caesarea. He appears as her husband as a signatory to two charters, one issued by King Baldwin IV of Jerusalem at Acre in 1179 and another issued by Walter II in 1182. Although his wife succeeded her brother as ruler of Caesarea, Guy is never called lord of Caesarea in any contemporary source. It is still possible that he did hold that title for a time. The Lignages calls him seignor de Cesaire.

Guy predeceased his wife, who had married Aymar de Lairon by 1193. Guy and Juliana had four children:

- Walter III, who succeeded as lord of Caesarea
- Bernard, who died without issue
- Isabella, who married Reynald of Haifa
- Bertha, who married Renaud de Soissons, marshal of Cyprus

== Bibliography ==
- Hamilton, Bernard (1992). "Miles of Plancy and the Fief of Beirut". In Benjamin Z. Kedar (ed.). The Horns of Ḥaṭṭīn. Yad Izhak Ben-Zvi. pp. 136–146.
- Hamilton, Bernard (2000). The Leper King and His Heirs: Baldwin IV and the Crusader Kingdom of Jerusalem. Cambridge University Press. ISBN 9780521017473.
- LaMonte, John L. (1947). "The Lords of Caesarea in the Period of the Crusades". Speculum. 22 (2): 145–161.
- Mayer, Hans Eberhard (1990). "The Wheel of Fortune: Seignorial Vicissitudes under Kings Fulk and Baldwin III of Jerusalem". Speculum. 65 (4). University of Chicago Press: 860–877. doi:10.2307/2863565. JSTOR 2863565.
- Nickerson, Mary E. (1949). "The Seigneury of Beirut in the Twelfth Century and the Brisebarre Family of Beirut-Blanchegarde". Byzantion. 19: 141–185. JSTOR 44168651.
- Nielen, Marie-Adélaïde, ed. (2003). Lignages d’Outremer. Académie des inscriptions et belles-lettres.
