= John Aleman =

John Aleman (died after 1264) was the Lord of Caesarea (as John II) in the Crusader Kingdom of Jerusalem, exercising this right through his wife, Margaret of Caesarea from at least 1243 until his death. John was active politically and militarily, although less influential than the previous lords of Caesarea had been.

== Biography ==
John Aleman was the son of Garnier l'Aleman and Pavie de Gibelet, and the older brother of Hugh Aleman. His maternal grandmother was Stephanie of Milly.

The first reference to John as lord of Caesarea comes in the Assizes of Jerusalem of John of Ibelin. Therein John writes that his cousin, the lord of Caesarea, refused the bailliage (regency) of the kingdom in 1243, and instead the Haute Cour gave it to Queen Alice of Cyprus. Since his father-in-law, Lord John of Caesarea, was dead, this is probably a reference to Aleman.

In April 1249 he and his wife sold six casalia near Acre to the Teutonic Knights. This included two—Seisor and Mergelcolon and Gedin—that he had inherited from his mother, and Beit Jann and Nahf. In 1253 they sold Al-Damun (and several villages in the vicinity) near Acre to the Hospitallers for 12,000 besants. In 1255 they also sold the Hospitallers everything they owned in Acre as well as the casalia of Chasteillon and Rout. On this occasion they were accepted into the lay confraternity of the order as confrater and consoror. Some of the money from the sales to the Hospitallers was used to pay the dower of John's brother Hugh's wife, Isabelle de Tenremonde, of the family of the lords of Adelon. She confirmed the payment of part of her dower in an act of 1259.

In 1254, after Louis IX of France and the Seventh Crusade had departed, John and some other barons of the kingdom wrote a letter to Henry III of England requesting aid. He is referred to in the letter as "John Asa, great lord of Caesarea" (Johannes Asa magnus dominus Caesareae). In 1257 John approved and confirmed a treaty made by the bailiff John of Arsuf with the citizens of trading city of Ancona. He does not appear again in contemporary records, but was still alive as late as 1264, when his son Hugh, the "heir of Caesarea", was killed in a fall from his horse. His second son, Nicholas, succeeded him. According to the Lignages d'Outremer, John and Margaret had a third son named Thomas.

John may have been alive when Sultan Baibars of Egypt conquered Caesarea for the last time in 1265. If so, he must have fled to Cyprus, where the subsequent lords of Caesarea resided.

== Bibliography ==
- Auguste-Arthur, Comte de Beugnot, ed. (1843). RHC Lois II (in French and Latin). Paris: R.H.C.
- Clermont-Ganneau, Charles Simon (1888). Recueil d'archéologie orientale (in French). Vol. 1. Paris.
- Delaville Le Roulx, Joseph (1883). Les archives, la bibliothèque et le trésor de l'Ordre de Saint-Jean de Jérusalem à Malte (in French and Latin). Paris: E. Leroux.
- Frankel, Rafael (1988). "Topographical notes on the territory of Acre in the Crusader period". Israel Exploration Journal. 38 (4): 249–272.
- Röhricht, Reinhold (1893). (RRH) Regesta regni Hierosolymitani (MXCVII-MCCXCI) (in Latin). Berlin: Libraria Academica Wageriana.
- Strehlke, E., ed. (1869). Tabulae Ordinis Theutonici ex tabularii regii Berolinensis codice potissimum. Berlin: Weidmanns.

Preceded by John (I)	Lord of Caesarea; 1238/43–1264/77	Succeeded by Nicholas and Thomas
