= Kafr Lam =

Kafr Lam كفر لام Kfar Lam
- Former village
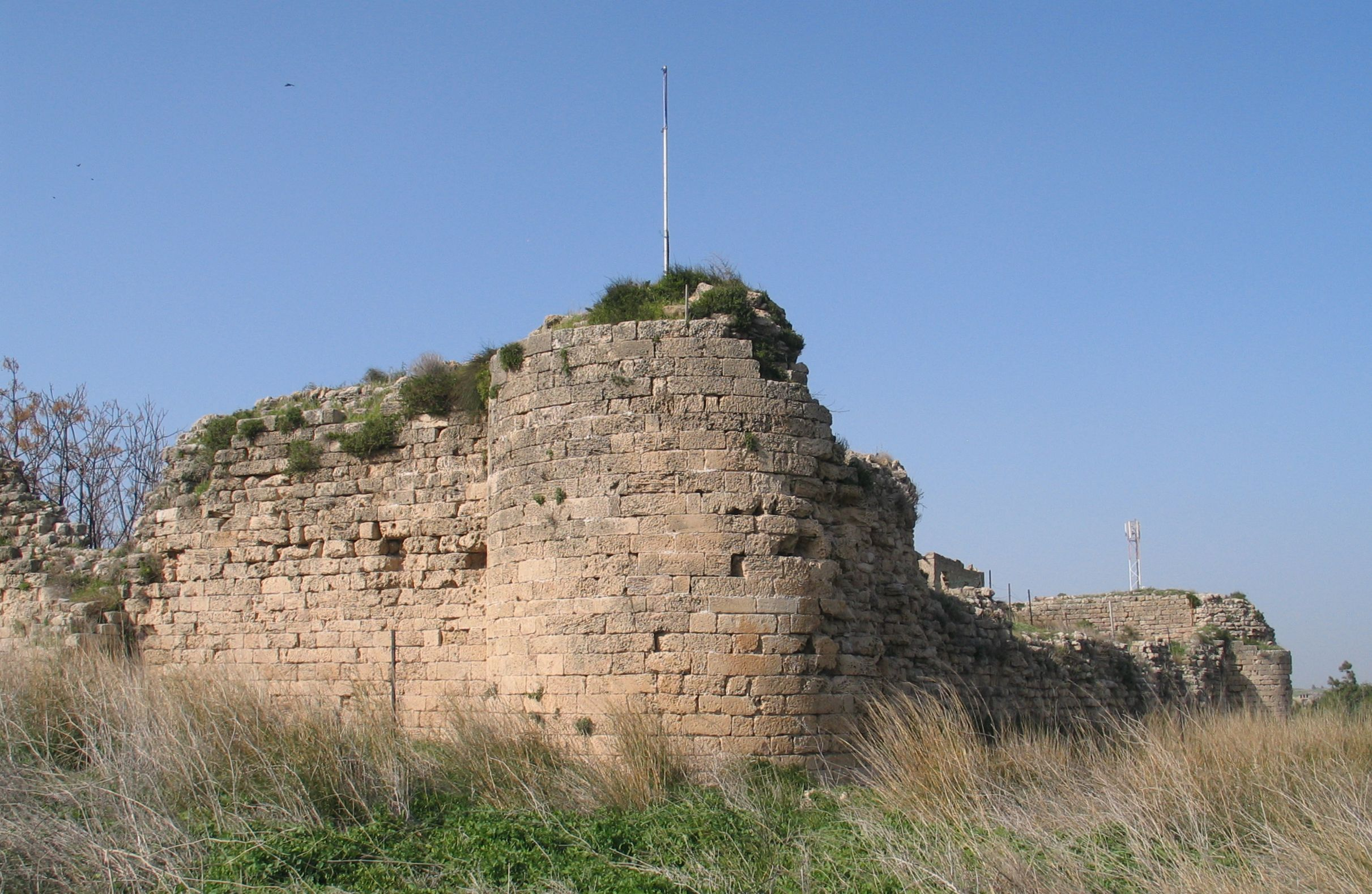
- The fortress of Kafr Lam as seen from the southeast
- Etymology: The village of Lam
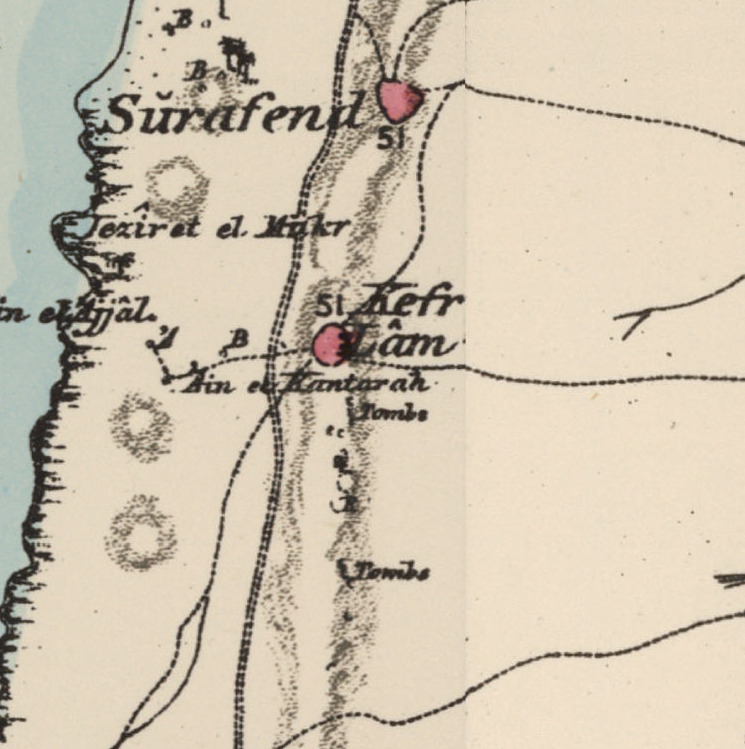
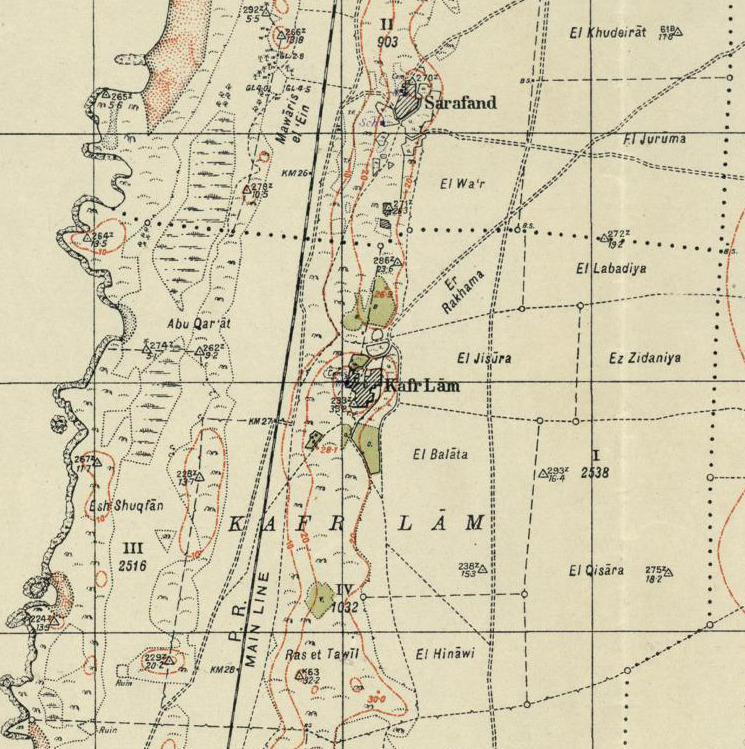
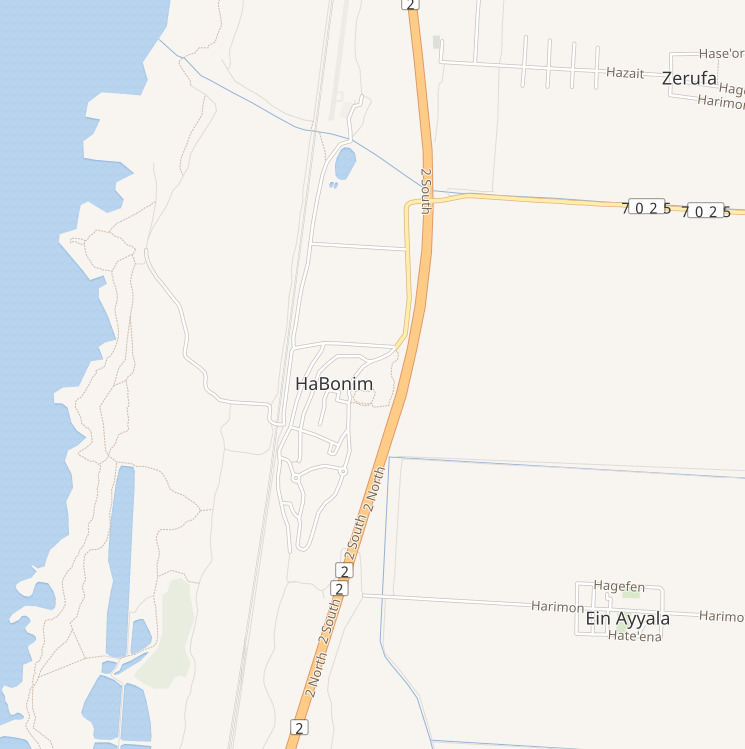
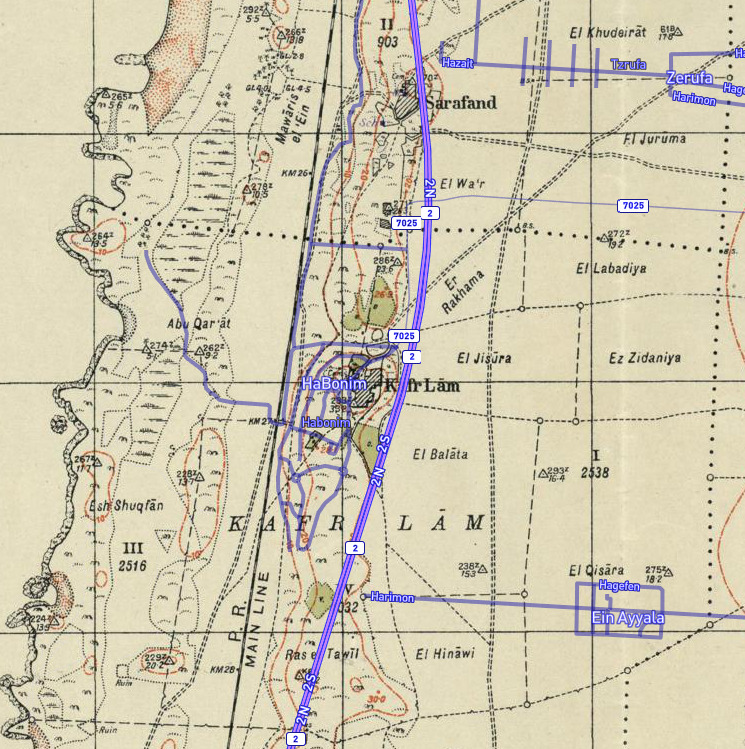
- 1870s map 1940s map modern map 1940s with modern overlay map A series of historical maps of the area around Kafr Lam (click the buttons)

- Location within Mandatory Palestine
- Coordinates: 32°38′15″N 34°56′04″E
- Palestine grid: 144/227
- Geopolitical entity: Mandatory Palestine
- Subdistrict: Haifa
- Date of depopulation: July 16, 1948

Area
  - Total: 6,838 dunams (6.838 km^{2}; 2.640 sq mi)

Population (1944-45)
  - Total: 340
- Cause(s) of depopulation: Military assault by Yishuv forces
- Secondary cause: Influence of nearby town's fall
- Current Localities: HaBonim, Ein Ayala

Kafr Lam (Arabic: كفر لام) was a Palestinian Arab village located 26 kilometres (16 mi) south of Haifa on the Mediterranean coast. The name of the village was shared with that of an Islamic fort constructed there early in the period of Arab Caliphate rule (638–1099 CE) in Palestine. To the Crusaders, both the fort and the village, which they controlled for some time in the 13th century, were known as Cafarlet.

Kafr Lam was depopulated during the 1948 Arab-Israeli war. While the village was largely destroyed, some of its former structures and their ruins can be seen in the Israeli moshav of HaBonim, established on the lands of Kafr Lam in 1949.

== History ==
=== Early Muslim period ===
According to the Arab geographer Yaqut al-Hamawi, the town of Kafr Lam was established near Qisarya by the Umayyad caliph Hisham ibn ´Abd al-Malik (AD 724-743). The fort built, in the shape of a Roman castrum, was erected during the late Umayyad or early Abbasid period, as a ribat meant to guard against attacks from the sea and invasion by the former rulers, the Byzantines.

=== Crusader period ===
Kafr Lam was a fiefdom of the lord of Caesarea during the Crusader period, and was known at this time as Cafarlet. In 1200, Cafarlet was granted to a vassal by the Lord of Caesarea, Aymar de Lairon.

In October 1213, Aymar de Lairon pledged the casalis of Cafarlet and two fiefdoms as surety for a debt of 1,000 besants he had taken from the Hospitallers. In 1232, the Casal of Cafarlet was sold to the Hospitallers for 16,000 Saracen besants, the increased value being a result of it having been fortified after a raid on the lordship of Caesarea by troops from Damascus in 1227.

The Hospitallers transferred ownership over Carfalet to the Templars by 1255. In 1262 the final exchange of the land of Kafr Lam took place between the Templars and the Hospitallers, leaving Kafr Lam under Templar control.

The village was captured by Muslim forces in 1265, but retaken by the Crusaders shortly thereafter. In 1291, it was taken by the Mamluks, who ruled over it from that time until the expansion of the Ottoman Empire into Palestine in the early sixteenth century.

=== Ottoman period ===
During early Ottoman rule in Palestine, in 1596, a farm in Kafr Lam paid taxes to the ruling authorities. Pierre Jacotin named the village Kofour el An on his map from 1799.

Descriptions of Kfar Lam under later Ottoman rule are available in the writings of European travellers to the region. For example, Mary Rogers, the sister of the British vice-consul in Haifa, visited Kafr Lam in 1856 and wrote that its houses were built of mud and stone and that the fields around the village abounded in Indian wheat, millet, sesame, tobacco, and orchards. In 1859, consul Rogers estimated the population to be 120, and the cultivation to be 16 feddans.

French explorer Victor Guérin visited in 1870 and noted that Kafr Lam was situated on top of a small hill and was inhabited by about 300 villagers. He further wrote that the village stood within a large stone enclosure that dated to the time of the Crusades.

In 1883, the PEF's Survey of Western Palestine described Kafr Lam as a small village of adobe hovels crowded within the ancient walls.

A population list from about 1887 showed that Kefr Lam had about 180 inhabitants, all Muslim.

In modern times, the houses of Kafr Lam were made of stone and either mud or cement and were clustered together. The villagers were Muslims, and maintained a mosque. A boys elementary school was built in 1882, but it was closed during the period of the British Mandate in Palestine.

=== British Mandate ===
In the 1922 census of Palestine conducted by the British Mandate authorities, Kufr Lam had a population 156, all Muslims, increasing in the 1931 census to 215, still all Muslims, in a total of 50 houses.

There were five wells on village lands. The village economy depended on animal husbandry and agriculture and the main crops cultivated were various sorts of grain.

In the 1945 statistics, Kafr Lam had a population of 340 Muslim inhabitants, and the total land area was 6,838 dunams. Of the land, a total of 75 dunams was for plantations and irrigable land, 5,052 dunums (1,248 acres) for cereals, while 14 dunams were built-up land.

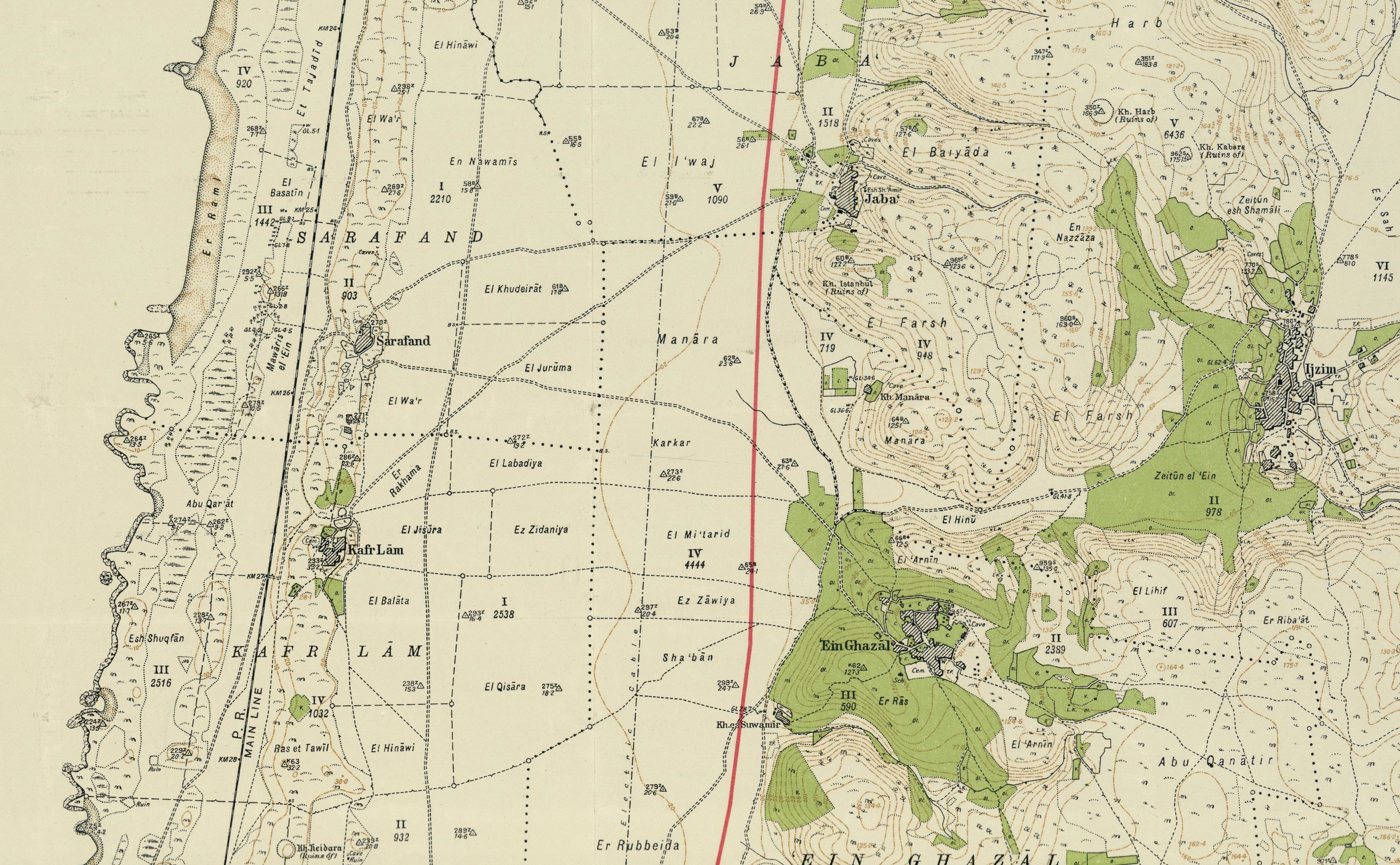
Kafr Lam on 1938 map (1:20,000)

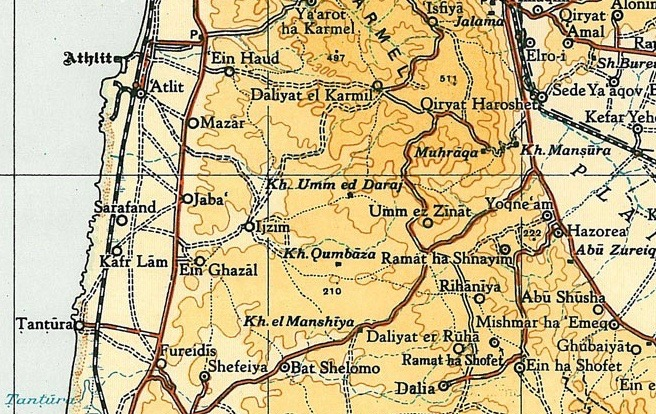
Kafr Lam on 1945 map (1:250,000)

=== 1948 Arab-Israeli war and aftermath ===
Kafr Lam was evacuated early in May 1948, but by mid-May some of the villagers had returned. On 15 May 1948, the first day of the 1948 Arab-Israeli war, troops from the Carmeli Brigade occupied Kafr Lam and neighbouring Sarafand, and briefly garrisoned the two villages. Both villages were re-occupied and cleared of their inhabitants by mid-July 1948. This operation involved the first use of support fire from Israeli naval forces, with two warships participating in the attack, aiming light-weapons fire at Kafr Lam and Sarafand.

After the start of the Second Truce, on 19 July 1948, units of the Israel Defense Forces (IDF) units continued to destroy Palestinian villages in various parts of the country. However, special interest groups, such as archaeologists, began to complain, calling for curbs on IDF destructiveness. Thus, on 7 October, Haifa District HQ ordered the 123rd Battalion to stop all demolition activities in "Qisarya, Atlit, Kafr Lam and Tiberias"; all of which contained Roman or Crusader era ruins.

Following the war the area was incorporated into the State of Israel. The moshavim of HaBonim and Ein Ayala were established on Kafr Lam's village lands in 1949.

In 1992, the village site was described as "[t]he abandoned Crusader fortress and several houses are still standing. One house, that of Ahmad Bey Khalil, has been converted into a school; another is being used as an Israeli post office."

== Demographics ==
The population (includes Kafr Lam Station) was 215 in 1931. In 1944/45 the population was 340.

== See also ==
- Depopulated Palestinian locations in Israel

== Bibliography ==
- Barron, J.B., ed. (1923). Palestine: Report and General Abstracts of the Census of 1922. Government of Palestine.
- Boas, Adrian J. (1999). Crusader Archaeology: The Material Culture of the Latin East. Routledge. ISBN 9780415173612.
- Bronstein, Judith (2005). The Hospitallers and the Holy Land: Financing the Latin East, 1187-1274. Boydell Press. ISBN 9781843831310.
- Conder, C.R.; Kitchener, H.H. (1882). The Survey of Western Palestine: Memoirs of the Topography, Orography, Hydrography, and Archaeology. Vol. 2. London: Committee of the Palestine Exploration Fund. (29)
- Government of Palestine, Department of Statistics (1945). Village Statistics, April, 1945.
- Guérin, V. (1875). Description Géographique Historique et Archéologique de la Palestine (in French). Vol. 2: Samarie, pt. 2. Paris: L'Imprimerie Nationale.
- Hadawi, S. (1970). Village Statistics of 1945: A Classification of Land and Area ownership in Palestine. Palestine Liberation Organization Research Center.
- Khalidi, W. (1992). All That Remains: The Palestinian Villages Occupied and Depopulated by Israel in 1948. Washington D.C.: Institute for Palestine Studies. ISBN 0-88728-224-5.
- Karmon, Y. (1960). "An Analysis of Jacotin's Map of Palestine" (PDF). Israel Exploration Journal. 10 (3, 4): 155–173, 244–253. Archived from the original (PDF) on 2019-12-22.
- Le Strange, G. (1890). Palestine Under the Moslems: A Description of Syria and the Holy Land from A.D. 650 to 1500. London: Committee of the Palestine Exploration Fund.
- Mills, E., ed. (1932). Census of Palestine 1931. Population of Villages, Towns and Administrative Areas. Jerusalem: Government of Palestine.
- Morris, B. (2004). The Birth of the Palestinian Refugee Problem Revisited. Cambridge University Press. ISBN 978-0-521-00967-6.
- Nicolle, D.; Hook, Adam (2012). Saracen Strongholds AD 630-1000: The Middle East and Central Asia. Osprey Publishing. ISBN 9781782007111.
- Palmer, E.H. (1881). The Survey of Western Palestine: Arabic and English Name Lists Collected During the Survey by Lieutenants Conder and Kitchener, R. E. Transliterated and Explained by E.H. Palmer. Committee of the Palestine Exploration Fund.
- Petersen, Andrew (1996). Dictionary of Islamic architecture. Routledge. ISBN 9780415060844.
- Petersen, Andrew (2001). A Gazetteer of Buildings in Muslim Palestine (British Academy Monographs in Archaeology). Vol. 1. Oxford University Press. ISBN 978-0-19-727011-0.
- Pringle, D. (1997). Secular buildings in the Crusader Kingdom of Jerusalem: an archaeological Gazetter. Cambridge University Press. ISBN 0521-46010-7.
- Pringle, D. (2009). The Churches of the Crusader Kingdom of Jerusalem: The cities of Acre and Tyre with Addenda and Corrigenda to Volumes I-III. Vol. IV. Cambridge University Press. ISBN 978-0-521-85148-0.
- Rogers, Mary Eliza (1865). Domestic life in Palestine. Cincinnati: Poe & Hitchcock.
- Röhricht, R. (1893). (RRH) Regesta regni Hierosolymitani (MXCVII-MCCXCI) (in Latin). Berlin: Libraria Academica Wageriana.
- Schumacher, G. (1888). "Population list of the Liwa of Akka". Quarterly Statement - Palestine Exploration Fund. 20: 169–191.
