= Walter II Grenier =

Lord of Caesarea, Kingdom of Jerusalem

Walter II Grenier (French: Gautier; died 1189×91) was the Lord of Caesarea, succeeding his older brother, Guy, between 1176 and 1182. The date of his birth is unknown. His parents, Hugh Grenier and Isabelle Goman, are recorded as husband and wife in five charters between 1160 and 1166.

Walter and Guy witnessed a charter of King Amalric I in July 1174. He is not mentioned in any source before 1182, by which time he was already Lord of Caesarea. That year, with the consent of his sister, Julianne, and her husband, Guy of Beirut, he sold the casale of Galilaea, near Caesarea, to the military Order of the Hospital for 5,000 bezants. This act was drawn up by the royal chancellor, Archbishop William of Tyre, at the Haute Cour in Jerusalem and was witnessed by the highest-ranking men in the kingdom: King Baldwin IV, Lord Baldwin II of Ramla (Walter's step-father), Lord Balian of Ibelin, Count Guy of Jaffa and the constable, Amalric of Lusignan. The king later confirmed this sale on 14 November at Acre.

Walter aligned with his step-father and the baronial party during the conflicts of the reign of Baldwin IV. When Guy, count of Jaffa and newly appointed bailiff of the kingdom, led an army out to the Pools of Goliath near Bethsan to face an invading army under Saladin, the baronial party, including Walter, refused to fight under him. In July 1187, Walter was one of the barons—along with Count Raymond III of Tripoli, Count Joscelin III of Edessa, Lord Reginald of Sidon and Raymond de Gibelet—who negotiated a treaty with Genoa to defend the city of Tyre from Saladin. After Conrad of Montferrat arrived in Tyre, Walter remained to participate in the defence there. He witnessed five of Conrad's acts between October 1187 and May 1188. By this time, the entire Lordship of Caesarea was in the hands of the conquerors.

Walter subsequently went to participate in the Siege of Acre (28 August 1189–12 July 1191), where he died. The Lignages d'Outremer states that "Walter was killed at the recovery of Acre" (Gautier fu occis ou recouvrer d'Acre), and the French historian Louis de Mas Latrie assumed that this meant on the last day of the siege, when the city fell. On his deathbed, Walter gave back the casale of Altafia, which his father had purchased from the Hospitallers after his grandfather had donated it to them, to the Hospitallers. This grant was confirmed by his sister and successor, Julianne, in 1197. It was also confirmed by the king, Guy, former count of Jaffa, to whom Walter had long been opposed.

Preceded by Guy	Lord of Caesarea; 1176/82–1189/91	Succeeded by Juliana with Aymar
