= Juliana Grenier =

Lady of Caesarea, Kingdom of Jerusalem

Juliana Grenier (French: Julianne; died 1213×16) was the lady of Caesarea, which she inherited from her brother, Walter II, upon his death between 1189 and 1191. When she inherited the lordship, it had recently been conquered by Saladin, but in September 1192 it was restored to her rule by the Treaty of Jaffa. The city and its fortifications, however, were not rebuilt in her lifetime.

Juliana was the only daughter of Lord Hugh of Caesarea and his wife, Isabelle. Her brother Walter seems to have granted her lands at Nablus. The jurist John of Ibelin in his treatise on the Assises records a list of fiefs and the service they owed around 1184: a certain lady of Caesarea is said to have owed two knights' service for lands near Nablus.

Juliana's first husband, Guy, was a brother of Walter II Brisebarre, Lord of Beirut. They are first recorded as married in a royal charter of Baldwin IV in 1179. In 1183, Juliana and Guy, who were apparently with the royal court in Jerusalem at the time, consented to her brother's sale of the casale of Galilaea, near Caesarea, to the Order of the Hospital for 5,000 bezants. It is not known if Guy was alive when Juliana inherited her title, or if he ever held the title Lord of Caesarea jure uxoris, although the Lignages d'Outremer records that he did. He was the father of four of her children: Walter III, her successor; Bernard, who died without issue; Isabelle, who married Reynald of Haifa, chamberlain of Jerusalem; and Bertha (Berte), who married Renaud de Soissons, marshal of Cyprus.

Juliana's second husband, Aymar de Lairon, certainly held the title Lord of Caesarea. Juliana herself is not recorded as lady until 1197, when she and Aymar confirmed a grant made by her brother in extremis. Between 1201 and 1213 she and her husband issued numerous charters in their joint names. In 1206, she, with the consent of her husband and eldest son, granted a house and some land in Acre to the Teutonic Knights. In 1207, with her husband's consent, she made a donation to the Order of the Hospital of a house and three carucates at Capharlet and the casalia (extended casale) of Pharaon and Seingibis (Khirbat Nisf Jubail) for the salvation of her parents' souls. Her family had a long relationship with the Hospitallers, which she continued by joining the order as a lay sister (consoror) with the right to be buried in the Hospitaller cemetery.

In 1212–13, Juliana and Aymar took out of a couple of loans from the Hospitallers "because of poverty" (compulsi penuria). There is also a later record, attesting to their monetary needs, that some time before 1243 a lady of Caesarea had sold land to the Teutonic Knights. In the first loan, houses in Acre and Tyre, as well as the casale of Turcarme, were pledged in return for 2,000 bezants. In the second, the casalia of Capharlet, Samarita and Buffles (castellanum Bubalorum, or Bablūn) were pledged for 1,000 bezants. Juliana never appears in a charter again after the loan of October 1213, and as Aymar never again bore the title of lord, it can be assumed that she was dead by February 1216, when Aymar first signs a charter without the lordly title.

== Notes ==
Preceded by Walter II	Lord of Caesarea; 1189/93–1213/6	Succeeded by Walter III
