= Walter III of Caesarea =

Lord of Caesarea, Kingdom of Jerusalem

Seal of Walter III

Walter III (French: Gautier), sometimes called Walter Brisebarre or Walter Grenier (bef. 1180 – 24 June 1229), was the constable of the Kingdom of Cyprus from 1206 and lord of Caesarea in the Kingdom of Jerusalem from 1216. He was the eldest son of Juliana Grenier, lady of Caesarea, and Guy Brisebarre the Younger. Since he was witnessing royal charters by 1195, he must have been born no later than 1180. In the 1220s, he was generally referred to as "the old lord of Caesarea", although probably only in his fifties. He took part in two Crusades and in two civil wars on the side of the House of Ibelin.

As a young man, Walter was frequently in attendance at the royal court of Jerusalem. He witnessed charters of Count Henry II of Champagne in 1195–1196, King Aimery in 1198, and the regent John of Ibelin in 1206. On an act of Aimery's he is termed "lord of Caesarea", although his mother was still living, as was her second husband, Aymar de Lairon, who subscribed as "lord of Caesarea" to the same charter of John of Ibelin witnessed by Walter. In 1200 and 1206 he was a witness on charters of his mother and Aymar.

== Loss of Caesarea and the Fifth Crusade ==
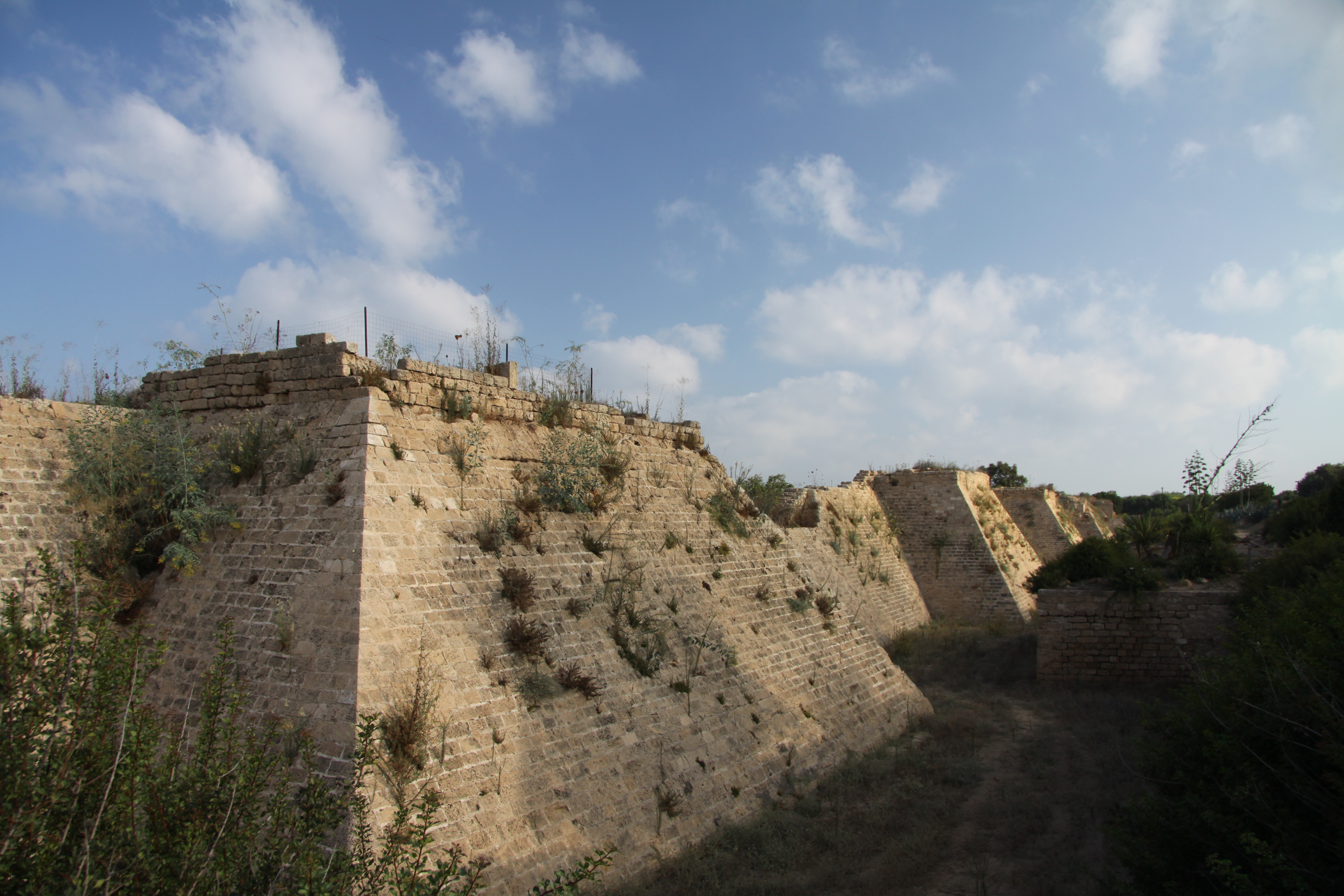
Ruins of the walls of Caesarea, rebuilt during the rule of Walter III

In 1206, King Hugh I of Cyprus nominated Walter constable, a post he held for the rest of his life. This was also the title Walter preferred when witnessing charters. Walter inherited the lordship of Caesarea on the death of his mother between 1213 and 1216, when the first reference to him as lord appears. In January 1217 he was in Acre at the court of the king, John of Brienne. By July he had returned to Nicosia, in Cyprus, where he witnessed a charter of Bertrand of Margat. In September he was at the royal court at Nicosia. He returned to the mainland in October, when he attended the council held at Acre by King Andrew II of Hungary to decide a course of action for the Fifth Crusade. As constable, Walter led 100 Cypriot knights at the Siege of Damietta in 1218. By July he had returned to Nicosia, where the dowager queen, Alice, was regent for the new infant king, Henry I.

In 1217–1218, while Walter was in Egypt, a Muslim army threatened Caesarea, but the city was successfully re-fortified by King John. In 1220, the Muslims returned under al-Mu'azzam and captured the city, which was being defended by Werner von Egisheim and the Republic of Genoa. In 1220, Walter was in Nicosia at the court of Queen Alice, where he witnessed a charter of hers. In 1225, he was in Tyre for the coronation of Queen Isabella II of Jerusalem.

== Breakout of civil war and the Sixth Crusade ==
Walter III married Margaret, a sister of the ex-regent John of Ibelin and the regent of Cyprus, Philip. This brought him firmly into the Ibelin camp opposed to the influence of the queen's husband, the emperor Frederick II. When the queen died in Italy on 25 April 1228, the Haute Cour (High Court) elected Walter and John to serve as co-bailiffs for the young king Conrad II, the Emperor's son, but they refused. The honour instead went to Lord Balian of Sidon and Eudes de Montbéliard. According to the Gestes des Chiprois and Philip of Novara's history of Frederick's reign, Walter was one of the judges of the judicial duel between Aimery Barlais and Anceau de Brie, which took place in Cyprus before Frederick's arrival at the head of the Sixth Crusade.

After Frederick's arrival, he held a banquet in Limassol on Cyprus, where Walter was present when the Emperor demanded that John of Ibelin surrender the bailliage of the kingdom. This was the spark which ignited the War of the Lombards, a series of intermittent civil wars between those of the local baronage who sided with the Ibelins and those who sided with the Italians (i.e., Lombards) who followed Frederick to Cyprus. Only after a truce was arranged between the Emperor and John, was the former able to continue his journey to Palestine. Walter accompanied him and witnessed one of his charters in Acre in April 1229. He took possession of Caesarea again after Frederick signed the Treaty of Jaffa with Egypt on 11 February 1229. When war broke out on Cyprus again, he returned to fight for the Ibelins and died at the Battle of Nicosia on 24 June.

== Family ==
Walter was the second husband of Margaret of Ibelin, widow of Hugh of Tiberias. She bore one son, John, who succeeded him in Caesarea. She also bore him four daughters: Isabella, Alice, Femie and Helvis. Alice married Jacques de la Mandelée, who need a dispensation because, according to the Lignages d'Outremer, "previously he was espoused to the sister of this one" (prius soror ipsius desponsaverat). The text is not entirely clear: it may be saying that John of Caesarea had married a sister of Jacques's, but more likely it means that Jacques had previously been married to Isabelle, whom the Lignages record as dying young. Femie (Euphemia) married John of Gibelet. Helvis became a nun.

== Notes ==
Preceded by Juliana with Aymar	Lord of Caesarea; 1213/1216–1229	Succeeded by John (I)
