= Aymar of Lairon =

Lord of Caesarea, Kingdom of Jerusalem

Aymar de Lairon (died 1219), also Adeymar, Adémar or Aimerich, was the lord of Caesarea in right of his wife from at least 1193 until her death between 1213 and 1216. During this period he was a prominent figure in the Kingdom of Jerusalem. As a widower he became the marshal of the Knights Hospitaller until his own death in battle.

== Lord of Caesarea ==
Aymar witnessed a charter of Count Henry II of Champagne, husband of Queen Isabella I of Jerusalem, in 1193, subscribing as Azemarus Cesariensis dominus ("Aymar, Caesarean lord"). He subscribed a second royal act with the same title the next year (1194). The wife in whose right he held the title, Juliana, is not herself recorded as the lady of Caesarea until 1197, when together they confirmed a grant made by her brother, Walter II, on his deathbed. Between 1201 and 1213 he and his wife jointly issued a number of charters.

Aymar was a leading baron of the Kingdom of Jerusalem during the reigns of Henry (1192–97), Aimery (1197–1205) and John (1210–15). He witnessed royal charters in 1193, 1194, 1200, 1211 and 1212. He also witnessed a charter issued the regent John of Ibelin in 1206. In 1208 he was part of the embassy dispatched to France by the Haute Cour to find a suitable husband for the young queen, Maria. He was present when that husband, John, was crowned at Tyre in 1210.

In 1212–13, Juliana and Aymar, "because of poverty" (compulsi penuria), took out of a pair of loans from the Hospitallers. In the first loan, houses in Acre and Tyre, as well as the casale (plural casalia) of Turcarme, were put up as collateral in return for 2,000 bezants. In the second, the casalia of Capharlet, Samarita and Bubalorum were put up for 1,000 bezants. Juliana never appears in a charter again after the loan of October 1213.

== Knight Hospitaller ==
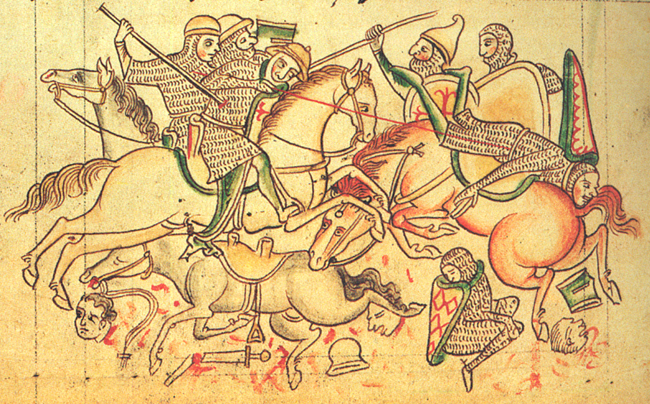
The battle of Damietta, from Matthew Paris' illustrated Chronica majora

In February 1216, Aymar first signs a charter not as the lord of Caesarea, but as the marshal of the Hospital. Juliana must have died in the interim, and as she was to be buried in a Hospitaller cemetery as a lay sister, it might be that Aymar had entered the order himself as a brother. He was still their marshal as late as October 1218, when he accompanied King John in the invasion of Egypt in support of the Fifth Crusade. According to the Estoire de Eracles, Aymar and the king led an attack on the Egyptian forces at the Siege of Damietta. According to Oliver of Paderborn, at Damietta thirty-three Knights Templar were either captured or killed alongside the marshal of the Hospital in 1219.

The Estoire records that Aymar had a nephew of the same name when alluding to his death in 1219. With Juliana he also left a son, Roger de Lairon, whose niece Agnes, from outremer (i.e. overseas, Europe), married Gilles de Beirut, according to the Lignages d'Outremer.

== Notes ==
Preceded by Walter II	Lord of Caesarea; 1189/93–1213/6	Succeeded by Walter III
