= John of Caesarea =

Lord of Caesarea (died 1238–1241)

John (died 1238–1241) was the lord of Caesarea from 1229 and an important figure in the kingdoms of Cyprus and Jerusalem. He was the only son of Walter III of Caesarea and Margaret, daughter of Balian of Ibelin. He was often called "the young lord of Caesarea" throughout his life to distinguish him from his father, who had been called "the old lord of Caesarea".

== Civil war (1229–1232) ==
John was a page at the feast held in Limassol in 1228, where the Holy Roman Emperor Frederick II tried to depose John's uncle John of Ibelin, from his posts of bailiff of Cyprus and lord of Beirut. According to the chronicler Philip of Novara, John conspired with Anceau de Brie to assassinate Frederick on this occasion. He was dissuaded by his uncle, who said: "[A]ll Christendom would cry out: 'These traitors overseas have slain their lord the Emperor.' Since he would be dead and we alive and safe, our right would become wrong, and the truth of it would never be believed. He is our lord; whatever he does we will guard our faith and our honour."

During the civil war that followed the rupture between the Emperor and the Ibelin family, John's father died in battle on 24 June 1229. He inherited both his father's lordship and his leadership role. He was in charge of some troops at the siege of Saint Hilarion. In 1230, men under his command killed Frederick's bailiff, Gauvain de Chenchi. After Frederick's forces captured Beirut, John went to Palestine to help his uncle reconquer them. He was in direct control of his lands, because he pawned some to raise money for the expedition. He led an army from Acre to Tyre, which he took, and on to Beirut.

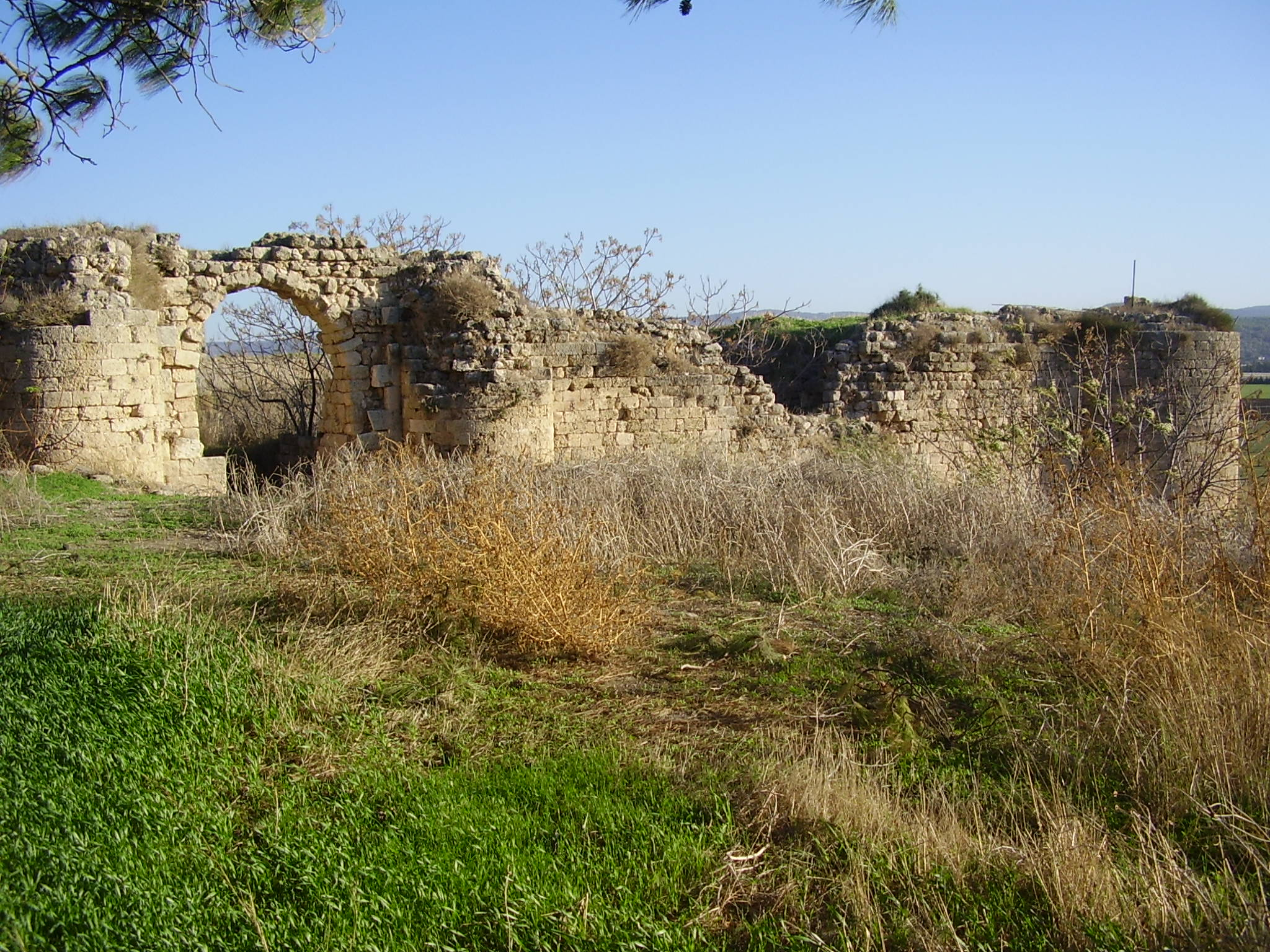
Ruins of the castle of Cafarlet, which John managed to sell to the Hospitallers after it had been declared forfeit by the crown

In 1231, Lord Balian of Sidon, the bailiff of the Kingdom of Jerusalem, declared John's fiefs forfeit, but was unable to put the command into effect. According to the Estoire d'Eracles John was still able to sell Cafarlet to the Knights Hospitaller for 16,000 bezants. According to the Gestes des Chiprois, he was also able to sell land he owned in Caesarea itself. In April 1232, John and his uncle lent their guarantee to a sale made by his cousin, another John of Ibelin.

In 1231, when Richard Filangieri, Frederick's choice of bailiff of Jerusalem, came to the high court in Acre, John led the opposition against him. John was not present at the Battle of Casal Imbert in 1232, but he soon afterwards returned to Cyprus and led a division at the Battle of Agridi on 15 June. While John of Ibelin besieged Kyrenia, John of Caesarea crossed back over to Acre, where he organised a commune to oppose the Emperor. When an assembly of the High Court threatened to turn violent on Frederick's representative, the bishop of Sidon, John intervened to save him. His uncle soon arrived to Acre to be accepted as head of the commune and promptly left, having placed John in charge as his lieutenant.

== Courtier in Cyprus (1232–1236) ==
John's rise in importance during the civil war can be seen in the high spot in which his name appears in the witness lists of many Cypriot charters in the following years. In 1232, he was second only to John of Ibelin among the witnesses to the treaty of King Henry I of Cyprus with the Republic of Genoa. In October 1232 he was again second of the secular witnesses, after Odo of Montbéliard, in an accord between Henry I and John's uncle-in-law, Eustorge of Montaigu, archbishop of Nicosia. In October 1233, he was present at a court held by Odo in Acre. There he signed third an agreement between the municipality of Marseille and the Knights Hospitaller and Knights Templar, and fourth a treaty between Jerusalem and Genoa. In December, at Nicosia, he witnessed another treaty with Genoa, signing his name after the king's and John of Ibelin's. That same month he was the second witness on two grants issued by the king to Archbishop Eustorge. In August 1234 his was the second signature on a charter of Henry's issued at Nicosia.

In February 1236, Pope Gregory IX wrote a letter to the barons of Cyprus and Jerusalem urging them to make peace with the Emperor and offering his own terms. John of Caesarea was one of those lords named by Gregory. In September, John and his uncle underwrote and annuity sold by Henry I. That year, the lords of Caesarea and Beirut joined the Hospitallers to unsuccessfully besiege the Muslim-held castle of Montferrand, where John of Ibelin died.

== Final crusade (1238) ==
In 1238, John of Caesarea negotiated with King Theobald I of Navarre when the latter arrived in Palestine on crusade. He may have followed him on his campaign and died in battle, for this is his last appearance in surviving records. On act of King Henry's in December 1239, where John's name would be expected it is absent. It is also absent from acts of John of Ibelin's sons, Lord Balian of Beirut and Lord John of Arsuf, from May–June 1241.

Philip of Novara records in one passage that "Sir Hugh [i.e., Hugh of Ibelin] and the young lord of Caesarea had already passed from this world, wherefor was great sorrow and loss to all their friends and to the two kingdoms." This passage is referring to the year 1241, and John's death must have preceded Richard Filangieri's assault on Acre, which occurred while John of Arsuf was at Arsuf, and after Theobald's departure. John was not present when the Haute Cour elected a bailiff for King Conrad II when he attained his majority in 1243. The lord of Caesarea who was present was John's successor, John Aleman, the husband of his daughter and heir, Margaret.

John and his wife, Alice of Montaigu—who was the niece of Archbishop Eustorge of Nicosia, of Garin, Hospitaller grand master, and of Peter, Templar grand master—had one son (perhaps named Odo), who died in infancy, and several daughters besides Margaret. The names of the other daughters are uncertain because of contradictions in the principal source, the Lignages d'Outremer. According to one section of the Lignages, a daughter named Alice married Richard of Dampierre and was the mother of Odo. According to another section, Alice became a nun and died young, while the mother of Odo of Dampierre was Isabel, the only other daughter mentioned in the other section. The second section also mentions daughters named Marie, who died without heirs, and Peretine, who died young.

== Notes ==
Preceded by Walter III	Lord of Caesarea; 1229–1238/1241	Succeeded by Margaret with John (II)
