= Hugh l'Aleman =

Hugh l'Aleman or Hugh Aleman may refer to:

- Hugh l'Aleman (died before 1241), nobleman of the Kingdom of Jerusalem, son of a German crusader
- Hugh l'Aleman (died 1264), nephew of the former, heir of the lordship of Caesarea
