= Margaret of Caesarea =

Lady of Caesarea, Kingdom of Jerusalem

Margaret (floruit 1249–55) was the Lady of Caesarea. She was the eldest daughter and heiress of John of Caesarea and Alice de Montaigu, and both of her parents came from the upper echelons of the nobility of Outremer. Margaret was the second lady to inherit Caesarea, after her great-grandmother Juliana.

== Life ==
It is unclear when exactly Margaret inherited her fief. Her father died between 1238 and 1241, but she is not recorded as lady until 1249. In his Assizes of Jerusalem, the jurist John of Ibelin records that his cousin, the lord of Caesarea, refused the bailliage of Jerusalem in 1243, and instead the Haute Cour gave it to Queen Alice of Cyprus. Since her father was dead, this is probably a reference to her husband, John Aleman, indicating that she was already ruling Caesarea by then.

In April 1249, Margaret and John sold six casalia to the Teutonic Knights. In 1253 they sold Al-Damun near Acre to the Hospitallers for 12,000 besants. In 1255 they also sold the Hospitallers everything they owned in Acre as well as the casalia of Chasteillon and Rout. On this occasion they were accepted into the lay confraternity of the order as confrater and consoror. Some of the money from the sales to the Hospitallers was used to pay the dower of John's sister-in-law.

Margaret's eldest son and heir, Hugh, died in a riding accident in 1264. Her second son, Nicholas, succeeded her. She had one other son named Thomas. The date of Margaret's death is unknown; she is never mentioned after 1255. Her son was in power by 1277.

== Notes ==
Preceded by John (I)	Lady of Caesarea; 1238/41–1255/77	Succeeded by Nicholas and Thomas
