= Hugh l'Aleman (died 1264) =

Knight of the Kingdom of Jerusalem

Hugh l'Aleman, who died 1264, was a knight of the Kingdom of Jerusalem and heir to the Lordship of Caesarea via his mother.

== Life ==
He was the eldest son of John l'Aleman and his wife Margaret of Caesarea, daughter and heir to John of Caesarea. He died by breaking his neck in falling from his horse. He died childless and so the Lordship of Caesarea was inherited by his younger brother Nicolas l'Aleman.
