= Far'un =

- Municipality type D (Village council)
- Far'un

Arabic transcription(s)
  - Arabic: فرعون
  - Latin: Far'oun (official); Far'on (unofficial)
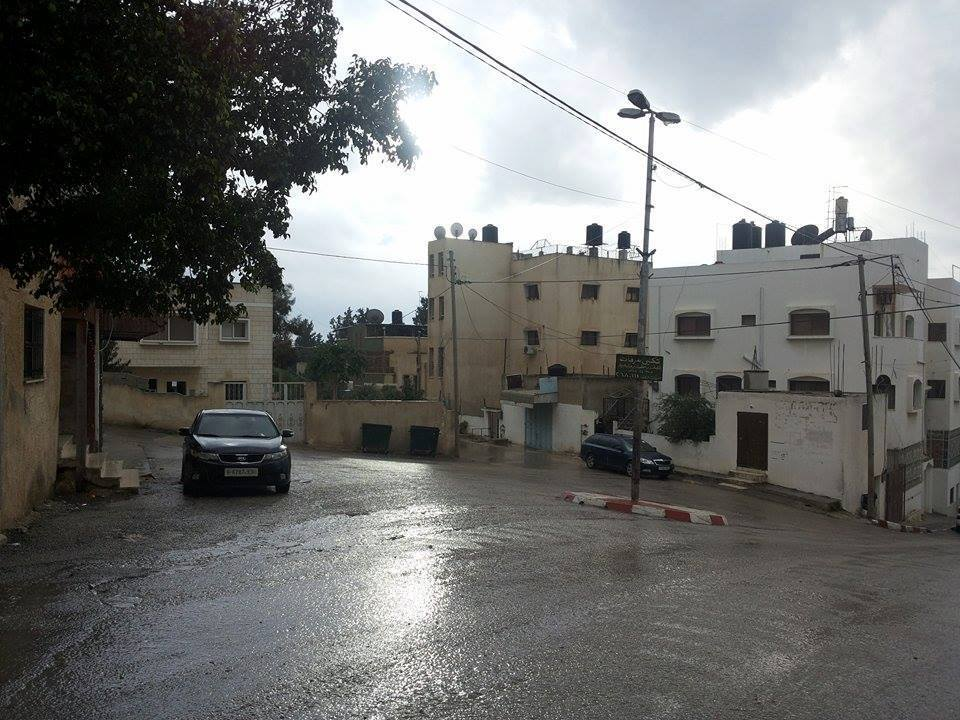
- Street in Faroun

- Location of Far'un within Palestine
- Coordinates: 32°17′10″N 35°01′23″E
- Palestine grid: 152/188
- State: State of Palestine
- Governorate: Tulkarm

Government
  - Type: Village council
- Highest elevation: 200 m (660 ft)

Population (2017)
  - Total: 4,131
- Name meaning: "Pharaoh" Or "Kafr Awn" which means the Awn's town.

Far'un (Arabic: فرعون) is a Palestinian town in the Tulkarm Governorate in the northwestern West Bank, located four kilometers south of Tulkarm near the border with Israel. According to the Palestinian Central Bureau of Statistics, Far'un had a population of 3,100 inhabitants in 2007 and 4,131 by 2017.

== History ==
In 1265, Far'un was among the villages and estates sultan Baibars allocated to his amirs after he had expelled the Crusaders. Half of the income from Far'un went to his emir Saif al-Din Dakhak al-Baghdadi, the other half to his emir Alam al-Din Sanjar al-Azkashi.

In 1320, Far'un is shown by Marino Sanuto on his map from that year as Farona.

=== Ottoman era ===
Far'un was incorporated into the Ottoman Empire in 1517 with all of Palestine, and in 1596 it appeared in the tax registers as being in the Nahiya of Bani Sa'b of the Liwa of Nablus. It had a population of 23 households, all Muslims. The villagers paid a fixed tax rate of 33,3% on various agricultural products, such as wheat, barley, fruit trees, goats and/or beehives, in addition to "occasional revenues"; a total of 3,837 akçe. 9/24 of the revenues went to a waqf.

Far'un was marked as a village named "Faroun" on Pierre Jacotin's map surveyed during Napoleon's 1799 invasion. In 1838, Fer'on was noted as a Greek Christian village in the Beni Sa'ab area, west of Nablus. The Christians were later replaced by Muslim migrants from neighboring Saffarin.

In 1870, the French explorer Victor Guérin noted that it was situated on a hill, and contained 500 inhabitants. In 1870/1871 (1288 AH), an Ottoman census listed the village in the nahiya (sub-district) of Bani Sa'b.

In 1882, the PEF's Survey of Palestine (SWP) described it as "a small village on a slope, at the edge of the plain, with a few trees and a well to the east. The inhabitants are Greek Christians. [..] The name means "Pharaoh" but may perhaps be a corruption of Pharathoni or Pirathion."

=== British Mandate era ===
In the 1922 census of Palestine conducted by the British Mandate authorities, Far'un had a population of 341, all Muslims, increasing by the 1931 census to 456, 450 Muslims and 6 Christians, in 107 houses.

In the 1945 statistics the population of Far'un was 710, 700 Muslims and 10 Christians, and the land area was 8,851 dunams, according to an official land and population survey. 390 dunams were plantations and irrigable land, 6,479 used for cereals, while 24 dunams were built-up (urban) land.

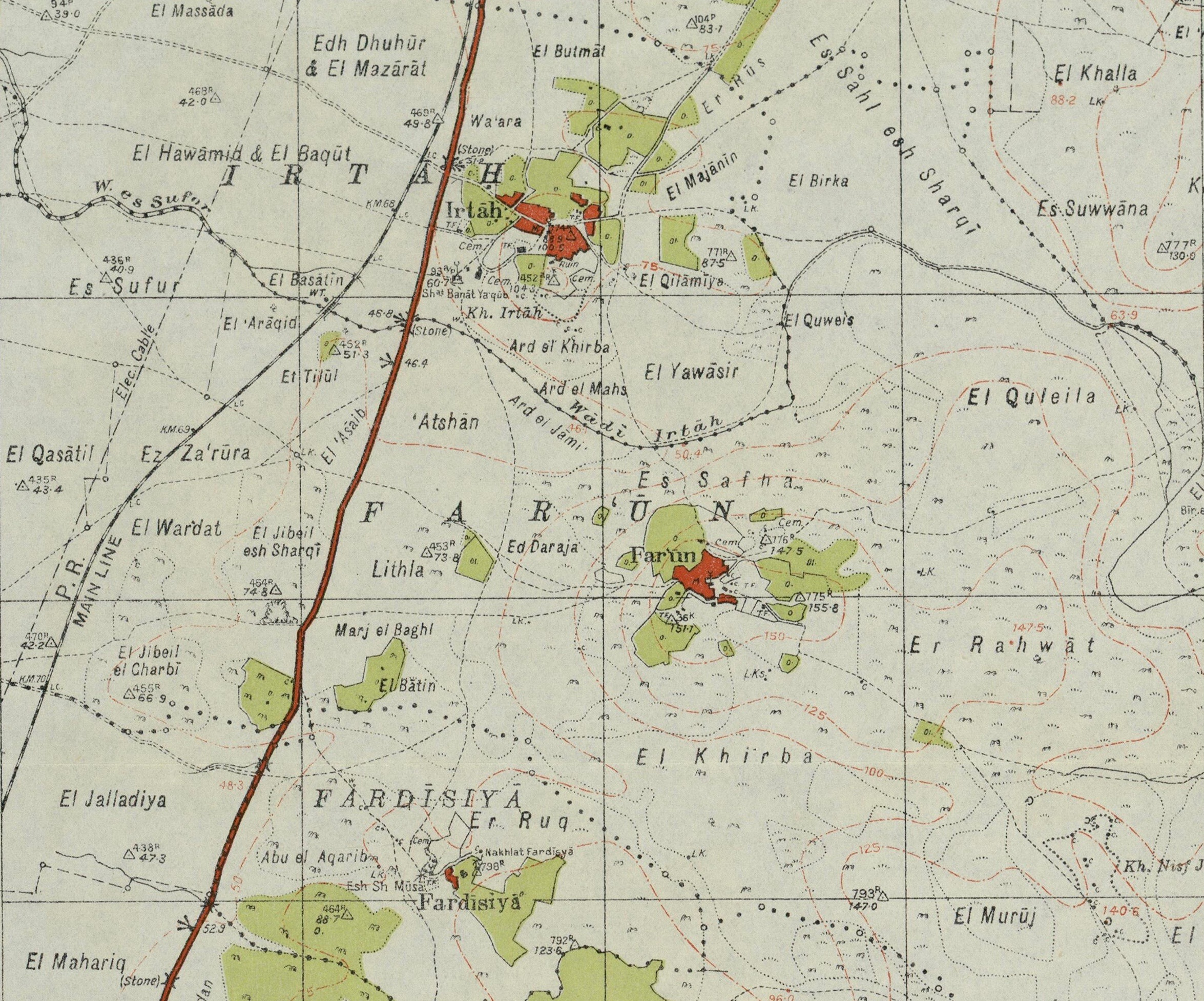
Far'un 1942 1:20,000, including Irtah

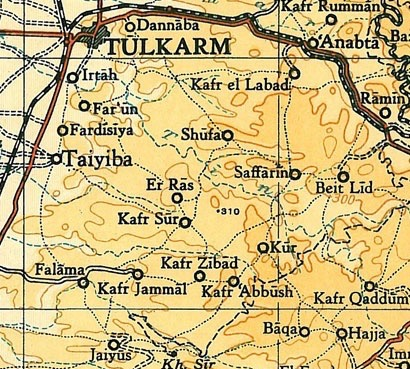
Far'un 1945 1:250,000

=== Jordanian era ===
After the 1948 Arab–Israeli War and the 1949 Armistice Agreements, Far'un came under Jordanian rule.

In 1961, the population was 1,093.

=== Post-1967 ===
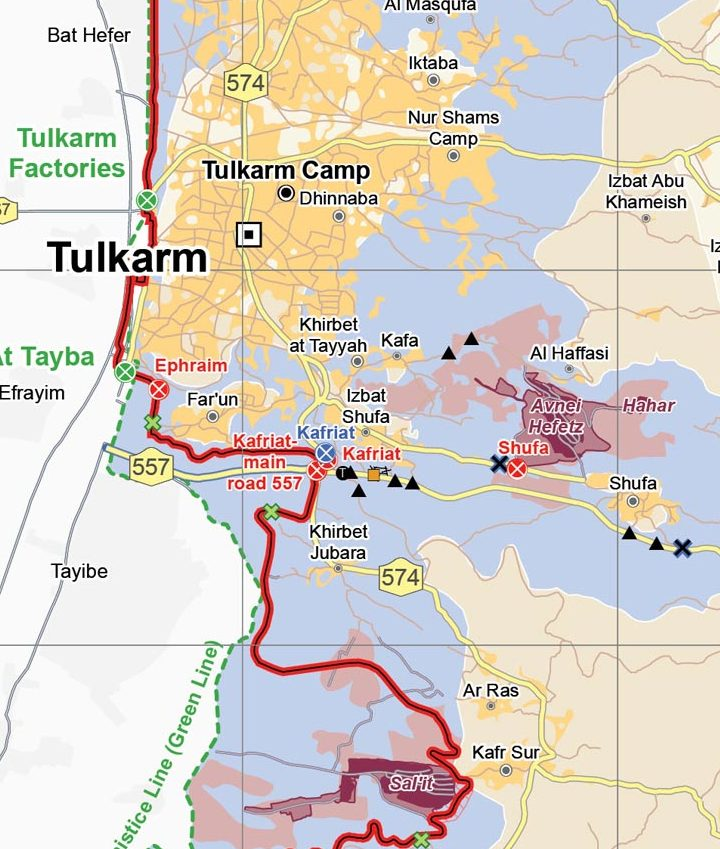
The area in a United Nations map, 2018

During the Six-Day War in 1967, Far'un came under Israeli occupation and has remained so since. The total land area of the town 8,800 dunams, however nearly half of Far'un's land has been confiscated by Israeli authorities. It currently has a land area of 4,333 dunams of which 495 is built-up area. About 70% of the town's land is planted with olive groves, 5% is cultivated with citrus, guava and almond trees.

Most of the town's labor force is employed in agriculture or work inside Israel. Far'un is governed by a Village Council and contains 3 mosques, 3 schools, a medical clinic and a child care center.

== Nufs Jebil ==
1.5 km SE of Far'un village centre lies Nufs Jebil. Nisf Jubeil was a Crusader casale named Seingebis belonging to the territory of Caesarea in the early 13th-century. In 1207 Lady Juliana of Caesarea granted Seingebis along with nearby Far'un to the Knights Hospitallers. In 1882, SWP found "Foundations on a hill" here.

== Bibliography ==
- Barron, J.B., ed. (1923). Palestine: Report and General Abstracts of the Census of 1922. Government of Palestine.
- Boas, Adrian J. (2006). Archaeology of the Military Orders: A Survey of the Urban Centres, Rural Settlement and Castles of the Military Orders in the Latin East (c. 1120-1291). Taylor & Francis. ISBN 0415299802.
- Clermont-Ganneau, C.S. (1888). Recueil d'archéologie orientale (in French). Vol. 1. Paris.
- Conder, C.R.; Kitchener, H.H. (1882). The Survey of Western Palestine: Memoirs of the Topography, Orography, Hydrography, and Archaeology. Vol. 2. London: Committee of the Palestine Exploration Fund.
- Government of Jordan, Department of Statistics (1964). First Census of Population and Housing. Volume I: Final Tables; General Characteristics of the Population (PDF).
- Government of Palestine, Department of Statistics (1945). Village Statistics, April, 1945. Government of Palestine.
- Guérin, V. (1875). Description Géographique Historique et Archéologique de la Palestine (in French). Vol. 2: Samarie, pt. 2. Paris: L'Imprimerie Nationale.
- Hadawi, S. (1970). Village Statistics of 1945: A Classification of Land and Area ownership in Palestine. Palestine Liberation Organization Research Centre.
- Hütteroth, W.-D.; Abdulfattah, K. (1977). Historical Geography of Palestine, Transjordan and Southern Syria in the Late 16th Century. Erlanger Geographische Arbeiten, Sonderband 5. Erlangen, Germany: Vorstand der Fränkischen Geographischen Gesellschaft. ISBN 3-920405-41-2.
- Ibn al-Furat (1971). J. Riley-Smith (ed.). Ayyubids, Mamluks and Crusaders: Selections from the "Tarikh Al-duwal Wal-muluk" of Ibn Al-Furat : the Text, the Translation. Vol. 2. Translation by Malcolm Cameron Lyons, Ursula Lyons. Cambridge: W. Heffer.
- Karmon, Y. (1960). "An Analysis of Jacotin's Map of Palestine" (PDF). Israel Exploration Journal. 10 (3, 4): 155–173, 244–253. Archived from the original (PDF) on 2019-12-22.
- Mills, E., ed. (1932). Census of Palestine 1931. Population of Villages, Towns and Administrative Areas. Jerusalem: Government of Palestine.
- Palmer, E.H. (1881). The Survey of Western Palestine: Arabic and English Name Lists Collected During the Survey by Lieutenants Conder and Kitchener, R. E. Transliterated and Explained by E.H. Palmer. Committee of the Palestine Exploration Fund.
- Pringle, D. (1986). The Red Tower (al-Burj Al-Ahmar): Settlement in the Plain of Sharon at the Time of the Crusaders and Mamluks A.D.1099-1516. University of Michigan. ISBN 0950054267.
- Robinson, E.; Smith, E. (1841). Biblical Researches in Palestine, Mount Sinai and Arabia Petraea: A Journal of Travels in the year 1838. Vol. 3. Boston: Crocker & Brewster.
- Röhricht, R. (1893). (RRH) Regesta regni Hierosolymitani (MXCVII-MCCXCI) (in Latin). Berlin: Libraria Academica Wageriana.
