= NAHF =

NAHF may refer to:

- National Aviation Hall of Fame
- Nahf, a town in Israel
