= Rainald of Haifa =

Rainald of Haifa (also spelled Reynald, French: Renaud de Caiphas) was a nobleman in the Kingdom of Jerusalem who was the first governor of the city of Jerusalem after it was recovered in 1229.

Rainald was a younger son of Lord Pagan II of Haifa. His older brother, Rohard II, became lord of Haifa. His attested in various acts, usually without any title, between 1197 and 1234.

Following the Sixth Crusade the Treaty of Jaffa in 1229, the city of Jerusalem itself was returned to the kingdom. The Emperor Frederick II, before leaving for Europe on 1 May, appointed Rainald as his bailli (lieutenant) in the city. He appointed Balian of Sidon and Garnier l'Aleman to share the bailliage of Acre, thus dividing the lieutenancy of the kingdom. Within a few weeks of Frederick's departure, Rainald had to call upon his colleagues in Acre for military aid when a group of Muslims from the region of Hebron and Nablus attacked the city. Balian and Garnier forced the raiders to retire.

Rainald is attested as chamberlain of the kingdom in 1230–1232. The office subsequently became hereditary in his family, which adopted Chamberlain as a surname. According to the Lignages d'Outremer, Rainald married Isabelle, daughter of Guy Brisebarre the Younger and Juliana of Sidon. They had four sons (Hugh, Philip, John and Guy) and three daughters (Odiard, Sibylla and Hawise). John succeeded him as chamberlain. Hugh, Philip and Guy died without descendants, but all three daughters married and had children: Odiard with Raymond Blondiau, Hawise with Daniel of Molembec and Sibylla with Jean de Morpho.

== Sources ==
- Hamilton, Bernard (2016). "Queen Alice of Cyprus". In Boas, Adrian J. (ed.). The Crusader World. University of Wisconsin Press. pp. 225–240.
- LaMonte, John L. (1932). Feudal Monarchy in the Latin Kingdom of Jerusalem 1100 to 1291. Medieval Academy of America.
- LaMonte, John L. (1947). "The Lords of Caesarea in the Period of the Crusades". Speculum. 22 (2): 145–161.
- Nielen, Marie-Adélaïde, ed. (2003). Lignages d'Outremer. Académie des inscriptions et belles-lettres.
- Riley-Smith, Jonathan (1973). Feudal Nobility and the Kingdom of Jerusalem, 1174–1277. Archon Books.
- Runciman, Steven (1954). A History of the Crusades. Vol. 3: The Kingdom of Acre and the Later Crusades. Cambridge University Press.
