= Planetarium (disambiguation) =

A planetarium is a theatre built primarily for presenting educational and entertaining shows about astronomy and the night sky.

Planetarium may also refer to:

== Science ==
- Astrarium, also called a planetarium, a type of astronomical clock
- Galileo Galilei Planetarium, locally known just as "Planetarium", a planetarium in Buenos Aires, Argentina
- Orrery, a mechanical model of the Solar System
- Planetarium (Belgium), the planetarium of the Royal Observatory of Belgium, in Brussels
- Planetarium (Copenhagen)

== Music ==
- Planetarium (album), a 2017 album by Sufjan Stevens, Bryce Dessner, Nico Muhly, and James McAlister
- "Planetarium" (Ai Otsuka song), 2005
- "Planetarium" (Bump of Chicken song), 2005
- "Planetarium", a song by Squarepusher from Hello Everything

== Other uses ==
- Planetarium (film), a 2016 French-Belgian film
- Planetarium (board game), a 2017 strategy game
- Planetarium (UTA station), a transit station in Salt Lake City, Utah, US
- Planetarian - visual novel
- Planetarion - abandoned video game
