= HaBonim, Israel =

Place in Haifa, Israel

HaBonim: הַבּוֹנִים (Hebrew)
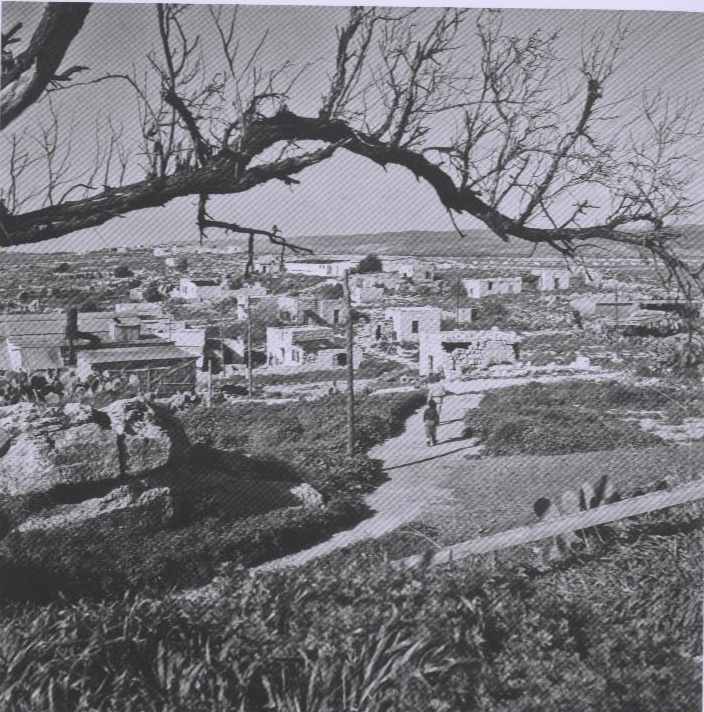
- Moshav HaBonim, 1950

- Location within Haifa region of Israel
- Coordinates: 32°38′9″N 34°55′57″E
- Country: Israel
- District: Haifa
- Subdistrict: Hadera
- Council: Hof HaCarmel
- Affiliation: Kibbutz Movement
- Founded: 1949
- Founder: HaBonim movement
- Population (2024): 465
- Website: www.v-habonim.co.il

HaBonim (Hebrew: הַבּוֹנִים, The Builders) is a moshav shitufi in northern Israel. Located 5 km south of Atlit and 3 km north of Kibbutz Nahsholim, it falls under the jurisdiction of Hof HaCarmel Regional Council. In 2024 it had a population of 465.

== History ==
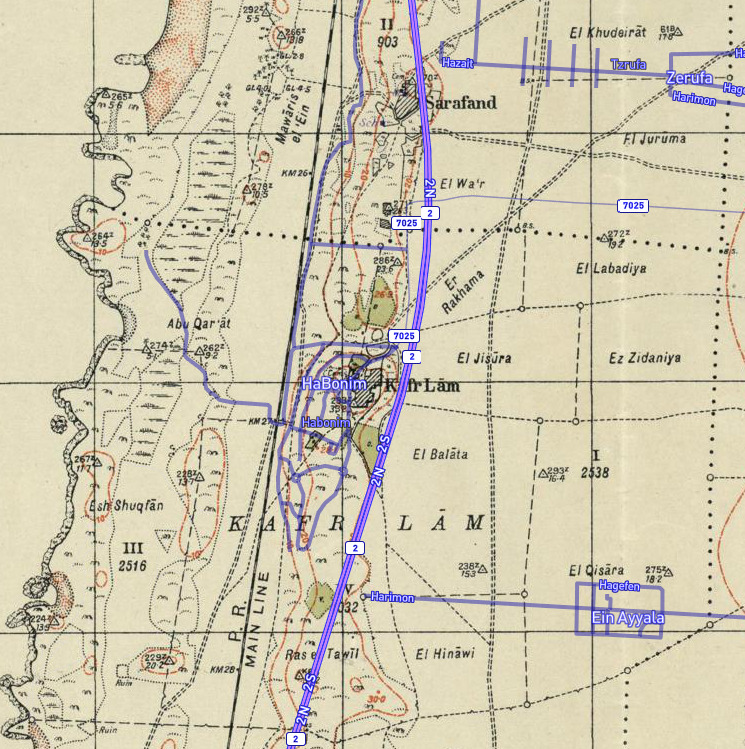
HaBonim was built over the ruins of historical Kafr Lam

The moshav was founded in 1949 by the HaBonim movement on land near the depopulated Arab village of Kafr Lam. The first residents were from the United Kingdom and South Africa. It came to national prominence on 11 June 1985 due to the HaBonim disaster, in which a bus and train collided, killing 22 people, of which 19 were schoolchildren. A monument was erected at the train crossing.

== Landmarks ==
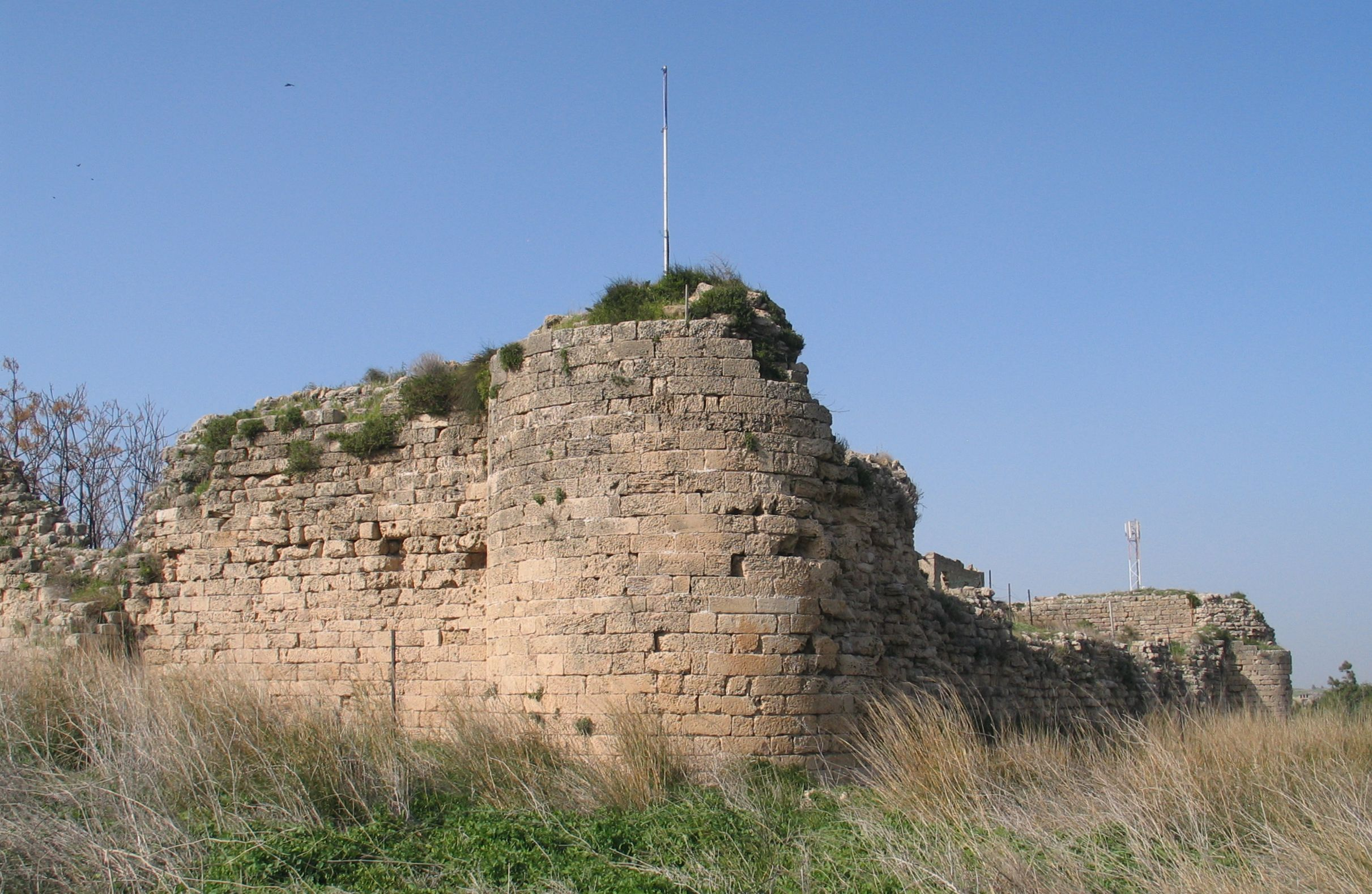
Cafarlet fortress

Located in the eastern part of the moshav grounds is the ruined medieval fortress of Cafarlet, sometimes referred to as HaBonim Fortress.

== Economy ==
Agrekal Habonim Industries, a manufacturer of Vermiculite and Perlite, was established in 1950 based on unique technology brought to Israel by the founders of the moshav from South Africa.
