= Nahf =

Arab town in northern Israel

Nahf: נַחְף; نحف
- Local council

Hebrew transcription(s)
  - ISO 259: Náḥep
  - Also spelled: Nahef (official); Naḥf (unofficial)
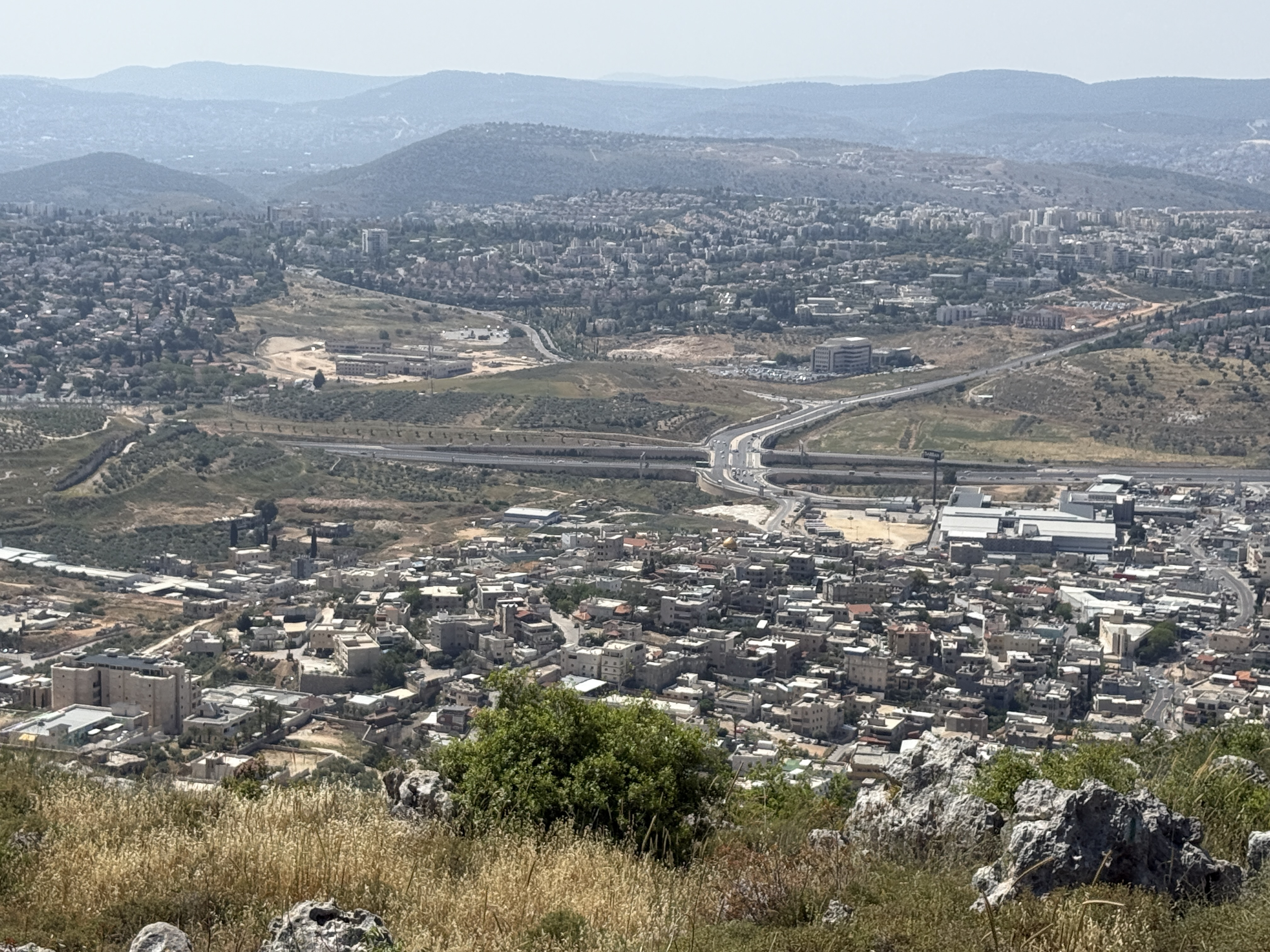

- Location within Northwest Israel
- Coordinates: 32°55′54″N 35°19′11″E
- Grid position: 179/260 PAL
- Country: Israel
- District: Northern
- Subdistrict: Acre
- Natural Region: Karmiel

Area
  - Total: 6,077 dunams (6.077 km^{2}; 2.346 sq mi)

Population (2024)
  - Total: 13,995
  - Density: 2,303/km^{2} (5,965/sq mi)

Ethnicity
  - Arabs: 99.8%
  - Jews and others: 0.2%

Nahf (Arabic: نحف, Naḥf or Nahef; Hebrew: נַחְף) is an Arab town in the Northern District of Israel. It is located in between the lower and upper Galilee, about 23 kilometres (14 mi) east of Acre. In 2024 it had a population of 13,995. Archaeologists believe that the area was an important center for viticulture in the Hellenistic period and possibly the Early Bronze Age IB period (ca. 3100 BC).

== History ==
Remains have been found from Early Bronze IB, EB II, Middle Bronze Age II and Iron Age II, as well as coins from the Ptolemaic dynasty and Antiochus III. Tombs from the 2nd to the 4th centuries have been found. Nahf contains Persian, Hellenistic and Roman remains.

From archaeological finds, it is assumed that blown glass vessels were produced in the village during the Byzantine era. A bath, containing a hypocaust from the same period has also been excavated. Dating from the late Byzantine era, it was in continuous use in the early Umayyad era.

In the Crusader era it was known as "Nef." In 1249 John Aleman transferred land, including the casalia of Beit Jann, Sajur, Majd al-Krum and Nahf to the Teutonic Knights.

In and around Nahf, there are a number of archaeological remains dating from the Middle Ages, including mosaics and a cemetery. In a nearby location lies the shrines of Muslim leaders Sheik Muhammad Rabiah and Sheik Mahmud who fought against the Crusaders. The Auba cave, which dates from the time of the Assyrians, is also located here.

Remains, including potsherds of bowls, plates and jars, all from Mamluk era, (fourteenth–fifteenth centuries CE), have been found in archaeological excavations.

=== Ottoman Empire ===
In 1517, the village was incorporated into the Ottoman Empire with the rest of Palestine, and in 1596, Nahaf appeared in Ottoman tax registers as being in nahiya (subdistrict) of Akka, part of Sanjak Safad. It had a population of 108 households and 9 bachelors, all Muslims. The villagers paid a fixed tax rate of 25% on wheat, barley, summer crops, fruit trees, goats and/or beehives, in addition to occasional revenues; a total of 6,629 akçe.

A map from 1799 by Pierre Jacotin showed the place, named as "Nafeh". When Victor Guérin visited Nahf in 1875, he described the village as containing 400 Muslims and some Greek Orthodox families, while in 1881 Nahf was described as a village of 200 Muslims living in houses built of stone surrounded by olive groves and arable land.

A population list from 1887 showed that Nahf had about 475 inhabitants; all Muslims.

=== British Mandate ===
In the 1922 census of Palestine conducted by the British Mandate authorities, Nahf had a population of 818, 2 Jews, 6 Christians and 810 Muslims. where all the Christians were Orthodox. At the time of the 1931 census the population had increased to 994, all Muslims, in 194 houses.

In the 1945 statistics the population of Nahf was 1,320, all Muslims, who owned 15,745 dunams of land according to an official land and population survey. 1,088 dunams were plantations and irrigable land, 4,571 used for cereals, while 44 dunams were built-up (urban) land.

=== Israel ===
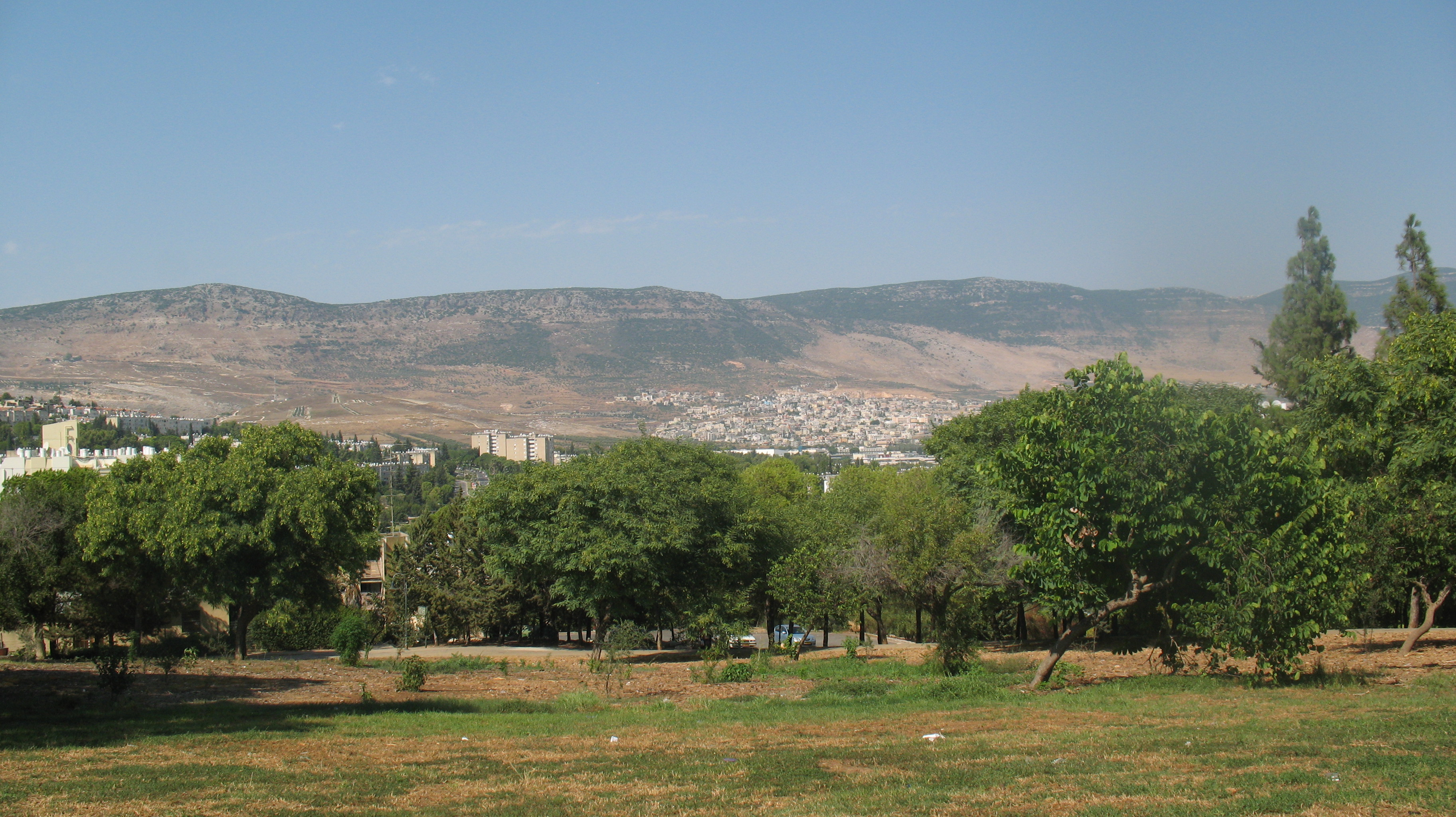
View of Nahf

Nahf was captured by Israel on 18 July 1948 during Operation Dekel led by the Sheva (Seventh) Brigade. Its defenders included the town's local militia as well as Arab Liberation Army volunteers. The town was left intact and most residents did not flee their homes. According to Benny Morris, Israeli troops may have used undue force to compel residents to hand over weapons, which sparked an irate response from the military commander who said those who committed such acts would be prosecuted and punished. The population remained under Martial Law until 1966.

== Demographics ==
Historical population
Year	Pop.	±%
1972	3,200	—
1983	4,800	+50.0%
1995	7,400	+54.2%
2008	10,500	+41.9%
2022	13,446	+28.1%
2024	13,996	+4.1%

In 2022, 99.9% of the population was Muslim and 0.1% was Christian.

== Notable structures ==
The largest medieval structure in the village is a roughly 10 meter long wall, made of large drafted blocks with a rubble core, which may be of Crusader origin.

The Maqam (shrine) of Shaykh Rabi is located on a steep hill above the village, surrounded by a cemetery. It is a domed rectangular building, with an entrance from the east. A deep mihrab ("Islamic prayer niche") is located inside, in the middle of the south side. By the north wall is the elongated cenotaph of Shaykh Rabi.

== Voting Patterns ==
In the 2022 election, 94 percent of voters in Nahf voted for the Arab parties, while 3 percent voted for the parties of the center-left coalition led by Yair Lapid and 2 percent voted for the parties of the right-wing coalition led by Benjamin Netanyahu. Among the voters for the Arab parties, 39 percent voted for the Hadash–Ta'al list, while 38 percent voted for Ra'am and 23 percent voted for Balad.

In the 2026 election, 98 percent of voters in Nahf voted for the Arab parties, while 1 percent voted for the parties of the center-left coalition led by Gadi Eisenkot and 0.2 percent voted for the parties of the right-wing coalition led by Benjamin Netanyahu. Among the voters for the Arab parties, 63 percent voted for the Joint List, while 37 percent voted for Ra'am. Voter turnout increased 57 percent from the 2022 election.

== See also ==
- Arab localities in Israel

== Bibliography ==
- Abu Raya, Rafeh (2013-06-09). "Nahf". Hadashot Arkheologiyot – Excavations and Surveys in Israel (125).
- Barron, J.B., ed. (1923). Palestine: Report and General Abstracts of the Census of 1922. Government of Palestine.
- Cinamon, Gilad (2012-09-19). "Nahf". Hadashot Arkheologiyot – Excavations and Surveys in Israel (124).
- Conder, C.R.; Kitchener, H.H. (1881). The Survey of Western Palestine: Memoirs of the Topography, Orography, Hydrography, and Archaeology. Vol. 1. London: Committee of the Palestine Exploration Fund.
- Dauphin, C. (1998). La Palestine byzantine, Peuplement et Populations. BAR International Series 726 (in French). Vol. III : Catalogue. Oxford: Archeopress. ISBN 0-860549-05-4.
- Frankel, Rafael (1988). "Topographical notes on the territory of Acre in the Crusader period". Israel Exploration Journal. 38 (4): 249–272.
- Government of Palestine, Department of Statistics (1945). Village Statistics, April, 1945.
- Guérin, V. (1880). Description Géographique Historique et Archéologique de la Palestine (in French). Vol. 3: Galilee, pt. 1. Paris: L'Imprimerie Nationale.
- Hadawi, S. (1970). Village Statistics of 1945: A Classification of Land and Area ownership in Palestine. Palestine Liberation Organization Research Center.
- Hütteroth, W.-D.; Abdulfattah, K. (1977). Historical Geography of Palestine, Transjordan and Southern Syria in the Late 16th Century. Erlanger Geographische Arbeiten, Sonderband 5. Erlangen, Germany: Vorstand der Fränkischen Geographischen Gesellschaft. ISBN 3-920405-41-2.
- Karmon, Y. (1960). "An Analysis of Jacotin's Map of Palestine" (PDF). Israel Exploration Journal. 10 (3, 4): 155–173, 244–253. Archived from the original (PDF) on 2019-12-22. Cited in Petersen, 2001
- Lerer, Yoav (2009-06-08). "Nahf". Hadashot Arkheologiyot – Excavations and Surveys in Israel (121).
- Mills, E., ed. (1932). Census of Palestine 1931. Population of Villages, Towns and Administrative Areas. Jerusalem: Government of Palestine.
- Palmer, E.H. (1881). The Survey of Western Palestine: Arabic and English Name Lists Collected During the Survey by Lieutenants Conder and Kitchener, R. E. Transliterated and Explained by E.H. Palmer. Committee of the Palestine Exploration Fund.
- Petersen, Andrew (2001). A Gazetteer of Buildings in Muslim Palestine (British Academy Monographs in Archaeology). Vol. I. Oxford University Press. ISBN 978-0-19-727011-0.
- Pringle, D. (1997). Secular buildings in the Crusader Kingdom of Jerusalem: an archaeological Gazetter. Cambridge University Press. ISBN 0521-46010-7.
- Rogan, E.; Shlaim, A. (2001). The War for Palestine: Rewriting the History of 1948. Cambridge University Press. ISBN 0-521-79476-5.
- Röhricht, R. (1893). (RRH) Regesta regni Hierosolymitani (MXCVII-MCCXCI) (in Latin). Berlin: Libraria Academica Wageriana.
- Schumacher, G. (1888). "Population list of the Liwa of Akka". Quarterly Statement - Palestine Exploration Fund. 20: 169–191.
- Strehlke, E., ed. (1869). Tabulae Ordinis Theutonici ex tabularii regii Berolinensis codice potissimum. Berlin: Weidmanns.
- Smithline, Howard (2005-03-30). "Nahf". Hadashot Arkheologiyot – Excavations and Surveys in Israel (117).
- Tepper, Y. (2007-08-16). "Nahf (East) Final Report". Hadashot Arkheologiyot – Excavations and Surveys in Israel (119). Archived from the original on 2012-05-15.
