= HaBonim train-bus collision =

1985 transport incident in Israel

Coordinates: 32°38′8.87″N 34°55′49.16″E

The HaBonim train-bus collision also known as the HaBonim disaster (Hebrew: אסון הבונים, Ason HaBonim) was an accident which took place on June 11, 1985, when an Israel Railways train collided with a bus carrying schoolchildren on a field trip from Y.H. Brenner middle school in Petah Tikva, Israel. The crash happened near Moshav HaBonim, killing 22 people (19 students, a teacher, the bus driver, and a parent chaperone), and injuring 17.

The bus involved in the incident was the second of four buses taking seventh graders from Y.H. Brenner middle school on an outing to the beach near HaBonim. The accident occurred along the coastal railway line at a level crossing on a rural dirt road less than a mile from the beach. The crossing was marked by signs, but as it was a little-used crossing on a secondary road in a rural area, it had no gates or crossing signals to warn of an approaching train. The director of Israel Railways said that the first bus made it safely across the tracks, while the second bus got stuck on the crossing as it tried to cross the railroad. A Haifa-bound passenger train travelling at 60 miles per hour then collided with the bus. The train's engineer sounded the horn and applied the brakes when he saw the bus in its path, but did not manage to bring the train to a halt in time. The train collided with the bus towards its rear, crushing its sides, flipping it over, and throwing it 40 yards from the crossing. All of the dead were from the bus, while of the injured, 16 were from the bus and one was a soldier aboard the train who had been looking out of a window and was injured when the driver applied the brakes.

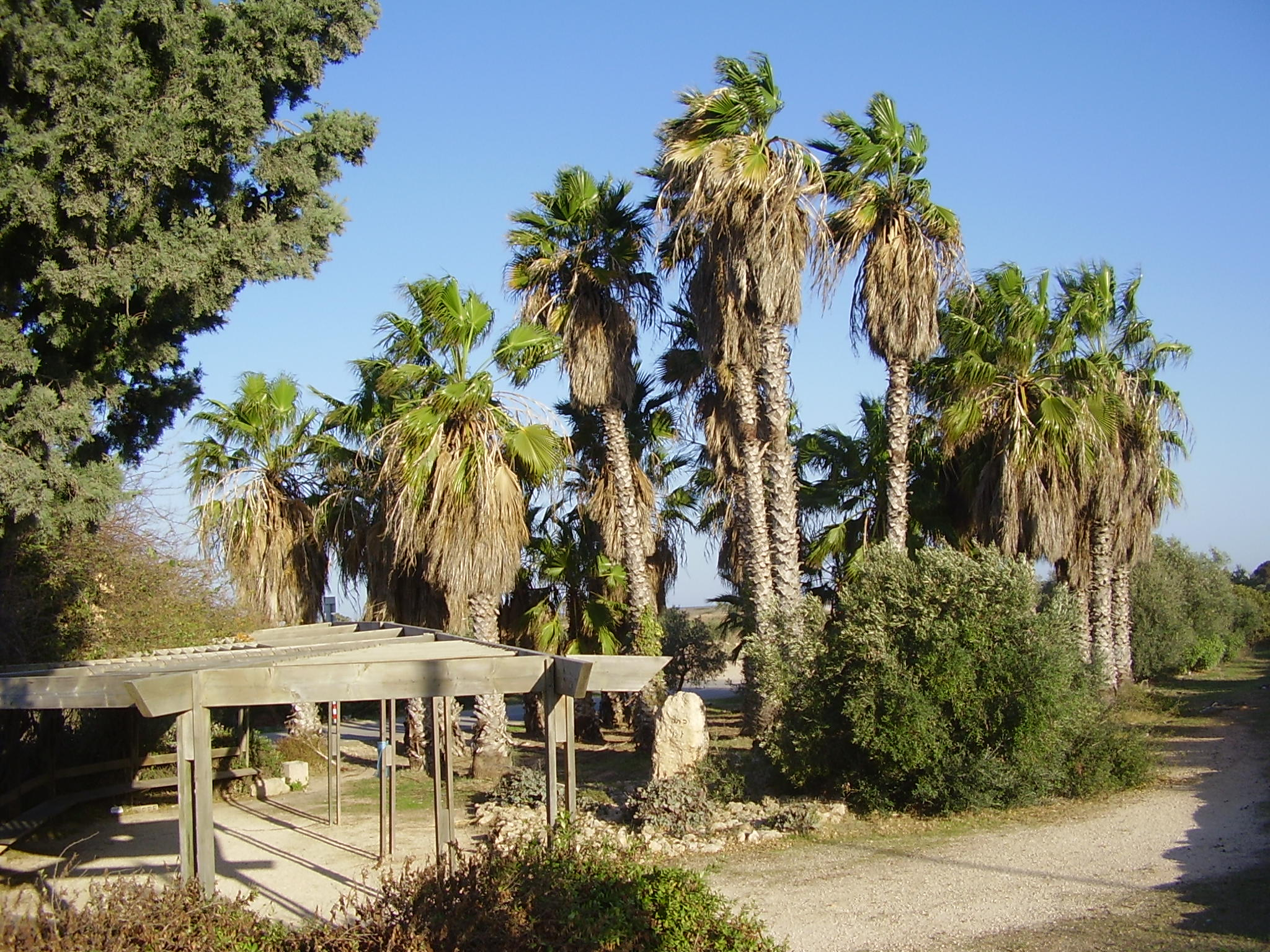
Memorial to victims of HaBonim disaster

Several investigative committees were appointed after the accident. The first, led by Professor Moshe Livneh of the Technion, found no mechanical faults in the bus. A committee led by Judge Ezra Kama recommended clearer signage at train crossings and installation of barriers.

The train operator, Shlomo Somech, was prosecuted for his role in the accident, but was found not guilty. Survivors of the accident who needed continuing medical treatment fought the Egged bus company for compensation.

Two weeks after the disaster, Yitzhak Peretz, a government minister from the Shas party, linked the train accident to Sabbath violation in Petah Tikva and invalid mezuzot at the school. Outraged parents of the victims unsuccessfully lobbied Prime Minister Shimon Peres to fire Peretz.

A memorial constructed at the site used rails from the train tracks with the victims' names inscribed on them. In 2004, it was discovered that metal thieves had stolen the rails.

In 1989 the rural dirt road at the crossing was paved with asphalt. In 1990 crossing lights and crossing arms barriers were installed. In 2006, in the wake of crashes at Revadim and Beit Yehoshua train crossings, Israel Railways accelerated its plan to minimize train-road interactions. At the time of the accident, the railway at the site consisted of a single track, which was widened to double track a decade later. With train traffic having increased substantially since the days of the accident, and with the anticipated future four-tracking of the coastal railway, the construction of a grade-separated rail crossing located 700m north of the site began in early 2021 and was completed in September 2022. Following this, the level crossing was closed.

In 2001, fifteen years after the incident, the father of one of the victims committed suicide at the crossing where the disaster had occurred.
