= Dark Souls: The Board Game =

Cooperative board game

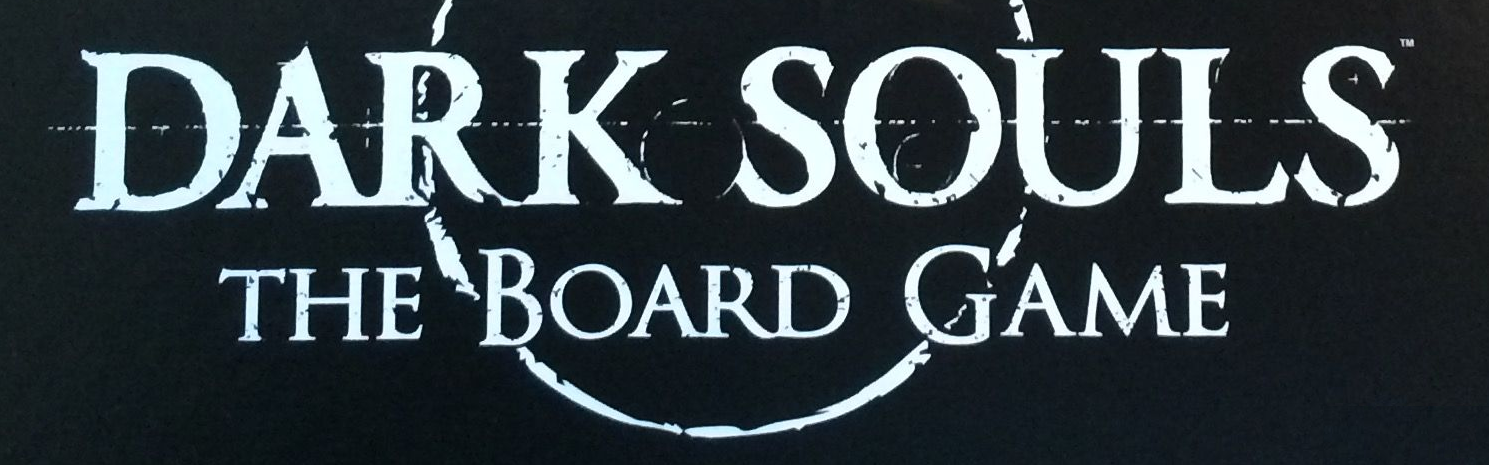
- Manufacturers: Steamforged Games
- Publication: April 2017
- Genres: Board game
- Players: 1–4
- Website: Steamforged.com

Dark Souls: The Board Game is a miniature-based exploration board game created by Steamforged Games. It was released in April 2017 and is based on the Dark Souls video game series by FromSoftware and Bandai Namco Entertainment. A crowdfunding campaign raised over £3.7 million was used to fund the project.

== Gameplay ==
Dark Souls: The Board Game is a miniature-based exploration board game that can be played cooperatively with up to four players. Players assume the game role of characters based on classes from the Dark Souls video game series and fight monsters and seek treasure. The game uses miniatures to represent players, mini-bosses and bosses. The miniatures are modelled after player characters and enemies from Dark Souls (2011), Dark Souls II (2014), and Dark Souls III (2016). The miniatures move on a node-based game board. Combat is card-based; bosses have a set of "AI" cards that determine their movement and attacks.

A unique aspect of gameplay is that the player's health and stamina share the same bar, limiting that player's ability to move and attack after having taken damage. Stamina regenerates at 2 points per turn, whereas damage requires healing at the bonfire checkpoints, or use of healing items.

To create different experiences each playthrough, players lay down random tiles and then draw encounter cards for each tile; encounter cards determine the enemies, terrain items and traps that spawn on that tile. Once players reach a boss, they choose a number of AI cards and shuffle them, then set aside a further "Heat Up" card. Players reveal the boss' AI cards in order without reshuffling until the boss drops below a certain amount of its total health points. The "Heat Up" card is then shuffled into the AI deck, giving the boss a new stronger card and changing the order in which it will attack for the remainder of the fight.

== Development ==
Dark Souls is an action role-playing game series developed by FromSoftware and published by Bandai Namco Entertainment. The board game was created by the UK-based company Steamforged Games. In 2015, designer and co-founder of Steamforged, Mat Hart, had been prototyping dungeon crawler tabletop games. He disliked the reliance on luck and repetitive nature of these games, so he sought to address these issues. Hart met with a friend, who was employed at Bandai Namco as a video game producer. Bandai Namco itself was eager to find a board game design that could translate the Dark Souls series into a new format. Before pitching their ideas to Bandai Namco, Hart and his team analysed the series to identify key aspects and determine which elements could be implemented in a board game format. Hart felt that the project he was prototyping at the time shared some of the same design philosophies embedded in the Dark Souls series. The success of Steamforged's medieval fantasy football tabletop game, w, contributed to them acquiring the Dark Souls license from Bandai Namco. The designers at Steamforged began rebuilding Hart's prototype as Dark Souls product. The biggest design challenge that Steamforged faced was trying to incorporate the high level of difficulty that the Dark Souls series is known for while maintaining an enjoyable board game experience. The design team was given full access to resources of the series so that they could replicate the tone and aesthetics. Initially, they found it difficult to decide what content should be included in their board game adaptation; they wanted to include iconic bosses and enemies from all three games in the series. Designer Rich Loxam believed that the use of miniatures would appeal to players by helping to immerse them in the fictional universe.

Steamforged launched a Kickstarter crowdfunding campaign in April 2016, seeking £50,000 to create the game. Their funding goal was achieved three minutes after the campaign launched. In total, over £3.7 million was raised during the campaign. The game was showcased at the tabletop game convention Gen Con in August 2016 and was released in April 2017. Steamforged released 12 expansions from 2017 to 2020. In 2022, two new core sets were released.
