= Bärenpark =

Board game

- Bärenpark box art
- Other names: Berenpark, Osopark, Park Niedźwiedzi, Медвежий парк, クマ牧場, 熊熊公園 Bärenpark
- Manufacturers: Lookout Games
- Designers: Phil Walker-Harding
- Illustrators: Klemens Franz
- Publication: 2017; 9 years ago
- Genres: Euro-style board game, Tiling puzzle
- Players: 2-4
- Setup time: 5-10mins
- Playing time: 30-45mins
- Chance: Low

Bärenpark is a multiplayer board game designed by game designer Phil Walker-Harding and was first published in 2017 by Lookout Games. Each player collects and places layers of tiles to plan the map for their individual bear park, a type of zoo common in certain parts of the world, such as the Bärengraben in Bern.

It won the Austrian Game of Games prize in the year of its publication. The game's designer has alluded to possible expansion of the game, including through the addition of monorails.

== Gameplay ==
Shapes of the 21 types of tiles

Each player starts with a 4x4 square land tile, which they then complete by collecting and placing a sequence of smaller tiles in the shapes of various polyominoes. These tiles have higher point values for larger pieces and for first placement of the smaller, more frequent tiles. In addition to basic green areas, such as food stalls, toilets, playgrounds, and rivers, players compete for choosing from a central pool of tiles for animal house and outdoor enclosures for polar bears, pandas, koalas, and Gobi bears. Players will continue to expand their park until their map holds four of the 4x4 square tiles in any arrangement.

On a player's turn, that player places a tile within their park map, rotating it in any direction that they wish; takes new tiles from the central pool based on symbols covered by the tile they just placed; and receives a bear statue if they complete a 4x4 square.

As game play continues, the point value for many of the tiles decreases and certain tiles may run out, eliminating that option for players to use in the rest of the game.

Once any player has completed their park, all players get one more turn until the game ends. Alternatively, the game ends when all players have played as many tiles as possible on their map. Then, players count their total score by counting all of the numeric values face up on their map, including enclosures, animal houses, and bear statues. The player with the highest score is the winner: in the case of a tie, the winner is the player with the highest score among unplayed tiles within their collection.

=== Advanced variant ===
In an additional variant of the game, players can choose three of ten possible bonus tiles that typically increase the desirability of placing a certain type of tile within your park. The player who fulfills the requirements of these bonus tiles first will receive the largest bonus, with subsequent players who also fulfill the requirements earning decreasing amounts in each succession.

== Reception and rating ==
The game has been generally well-received since its release. It garnered nominations for the 2017 Meeples' Choice and Golden Geek Best Family Board Game awards from the same site. It won the Austrian Game of Games prize.

In addition, the game was featured in a number of 2017 Best Of lists for board games, including Paste and Ars Technica.
