= Escape the Dark Castle =

Cooperative board game

- Designers: Alex Crispin; Thomas Pike; James Shelton
- Illustrators: Alex Crispin
- Publishers: Themeborne Ltd
- Publication: 2017; 9 years ago
- Genres: Cooperative board game
- Players: 1–4
- Playing time: 20–45 minutes
- Age range: 14+

Escape the Dark Castle is a cooperative board game designed by Alex Crispin, Thomas Pike, and James Shelton and published in 2017 by Themeborne Ltd. Players cooperate as wrongfully imprisoned adventurers navigating a randomly generated series of atmospheric chapter encounters—using dice, items, and group choices to survive traps, horrors, and combat—in a desperate bid to escape together without losing a single member.

== Publishing history ==
Escape the Dark Castle was published by Themeborne Ltd. following a successful Kickstarter campaign in June 2017. Three expansion packs for the game were released in 2018, adding new mechanics, characters, cards, and dice.

A second game in the Escape the Dark series, a sci-fi inspired game titled Escape the Dark Sector which reimplemented many of the game mechanics from Escape the Dark Castle, was similarly funded and released in 2020. The game system was also reimplemented in The Last of Us: Escape the Dark, which released in 2024.

In October 2025, Themeborne opened a Gamefound campaign to fund a second edition of Escape the Dark Castle that would improve the game's art, balance, and difficulty, as well as add more cards and mechanics. The game was successfully funded and is set to release in late 2026 alongside Escape the Dark Forest, a standalone entry in the series compatible with the second edition.

== Gameplay ==
In Escape the Dark Castle, players play as one of six characters that each have different strengths in three traits (Might, Cunning, and Wisdom) and an associated character die. The game includes a deck of 45 chapter cards that describe scenarios and obstacles that players must face and choose the correct path out of. To begin a new game, 15 random chapter cards are drawn to form the castle deck and a random boss card is placed at the end. Players must work together to survive the 15 rooms of the castle and defeat the boss without any player running out of hit points in order to win the game.

Each round, the group elects one player to enter the next room of the castle first; they draw the next chapter card from the castle deck, read out the scenario on it, and are the one to potentially suffer a positive or negative consequences upon entering. In the new room, players will collectively have to either make a choice, roll dice, draw or use items from the item card deck, or fight an enemy to move forward. When fighting an enemy, a number of chapter dice equal to the number of players are rolled. One player is allowed to sit out the fight and recover hit points, while the other players fight. To attack, all players roll their character dice simultaneously and if a symbol that was rolled matches any of the symbols on the rolled chapter dice, then that chapter dice is removed. If there are any remaining chapter dice, then any attacking player who did not roll a block symbol takes damage equal to the enemy's attack. The enemy is defeated when all chapter dice have been removed.

== Reception ==
A review in Rebel Times by Michał Misztal praised Escape the Dark Castle's atmospheric gameplay, simple rules, and high replayability, but criticized the game's high randomness and the player's limited control over that randomness. In an article for The Guardian, Keith Stuart commended the game for its visual style and noted that the cooperative gameplay is great for families. Escape the Dark Castle was described as "one of the nicest, most cohesive-looking dungeon-crawls out there" by Nic Reuben, writing for Dicebreaker, who also emphasized the game's "atmospheric text and art" and quick gameplay. Alex Garbett described the game as "a labour of love from the creators [that] shows through in every aspect of the product" in a review for Irregular Magazine. Writing for Black Gate, John O'Neill also praised the game's length, artwork, and cooperative gameplay, as well as its replayability.
