= Planetarium (board game) =

Board game

- Designers: Stéphane Vachon
- Illustrators: Greg May, Dann May
- Publishers: Game Salute (2017)
- Players: 1–4
- Setup time: <5 minutes
- Playing time: 45 Minutes
- Chance: Moderate
- Age range: 10+
- Skills: Strategy, Grid Movement, Hand Management

Planetarium is a strategy board game designed by Stéphane Vachon. The theme of the game is planetary formation and the birth of a new solar system.

In 2015, the game won the Le Plateau d'or, a game design contest presented during Les journées Ludique de Québec, an annual gaming convention held in Canada. In July 2015, the publishing rights to the game were acquired by tabletop game publisher Game Salute, and for one year Stéphane Vachon and Dann May (Chief Creative Officer at Game Salute) worked together to modify the game design, develop the game play and redesign the components. In June 2016, Planetarium launched on Kickstarter, in a campaign that ran for 3 weeks. 3,000 backers supported the project with funding raised of $126,815. The game is scheduled to be delivered to Kickstarter backers in March 2017 and will be available in the retail market 1 or 2 months later.

== Description ==
Matter swirls around a new born star, coalescing on the planetoids that orbit it. Planets evolve, grow and migrate in their orbits, forming a unique solar system by the end of every game. Planetarium is a game of creation, chaos and terraforming on the grandest scale.

Players are competing to crash combinations of elements onto planets that then allow them to play cards to evolve the planets in a variety of ways, with each player looking to evolve planets in the system to suit their own secret endgame goals.

On a turn a player will firstly move a matter or planet token in a clockwise direction around the star. The board is mapped with a series of lines, tracing orbits around the star, and it is along these lines that the tokens are moved. If a matter token moves onto a space occupied by planet token then the matter token is placed on the player's mat (on the respective planet). In the same way, planets can also be moved onto matter tokens, placing the matter tokens on the player's mat.

In the second part of a turn a player can play Evolution cards from their hand at the cost of the matter tokens they have collected on their player mat (some cards have other special requirements to play). If a player plays a card, they score the cards points and check to see if their card has changed the state of the planet from hostile to habitable by checking the total habitable and hostile points played to the planet (some end game goals require planets to be hostile or habitable). The player may then draw a card from one of three decks, Low Evolution (cards that score less points but require less matter to play), High Evolution (cards that score more and are harder to play), and Final Evolution (cards that can only be played on a player's final turn).

The theme of the game has been developed with an eye on the science, led by a scientist working on NASA's search for life on Mars. Evolution cards thematically include all kinds of planetary phenomenon, from asteroid impacts, atmospheric effects, to geological events. Final Evolution cards mark the relatively stable state a planet is in at the end of the solar system's development and include classifications for the final planets such as Hot Jupiter or an uninhabitable frozen dwarf planet.

The game consists of a game board with handfuls of matter tokens, approximately 36 Evolution cards and 16 Final Evolution cards, player mats, and player and score markers.

== The Idea ==
The idea of the game came from when Stéphane Vachon saw a documentary on a TV show about planetary formation theory. After this he saw many other documentaries on YouTube and made some searches on this subject. Originally, the game included five kinds of matter: water, gas, rock, metal and carbon. The carbon was removed and the final product keeps only 4 kinds of matter.

After 3 years of work, the game was entered in the game design contest at Quebec City.

== Plateau d’or ==
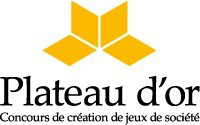
Plateau d'or logo

This game contest is a popular in Quebec and has existed for almost 10 years. In 2015, approximately 50 games were submitted. Exactly 25 games were preselected 3 weeks later as part of the first round of judging. In the second round, the list was narrowed to 10 games, and the designers were invited to present their game during the event Les journées Ludique de Québec. Two weeks later, the final round saw 5 games selected and presented to a jury of experts.

The jury played these 5 games during the event and selected one winner. Planetarium was the winner of the contest in 2015.

== Reviews ==
The Board Game Family playtest the game during the Kickstarter Campaign and enjoy the game.

== Full Credits ==
- Designer: Stéphane Vachon
- Additional Design and Development: Dann May
- Science Consultant: James Lewis
- Artist: Dann May, Greg May
- Production Management: Cody Jones
- Publisher: Game Salute
