= Feudum =

Board game

Feudum is a fantasy- and medieval-themed euro-style board game with focus on resource management for 2-5 players, released in 2017.

The game was designed by a University of Missouri professor Mark Swanson and funded through a Kickstarter campaign.
