= Cafarlet =

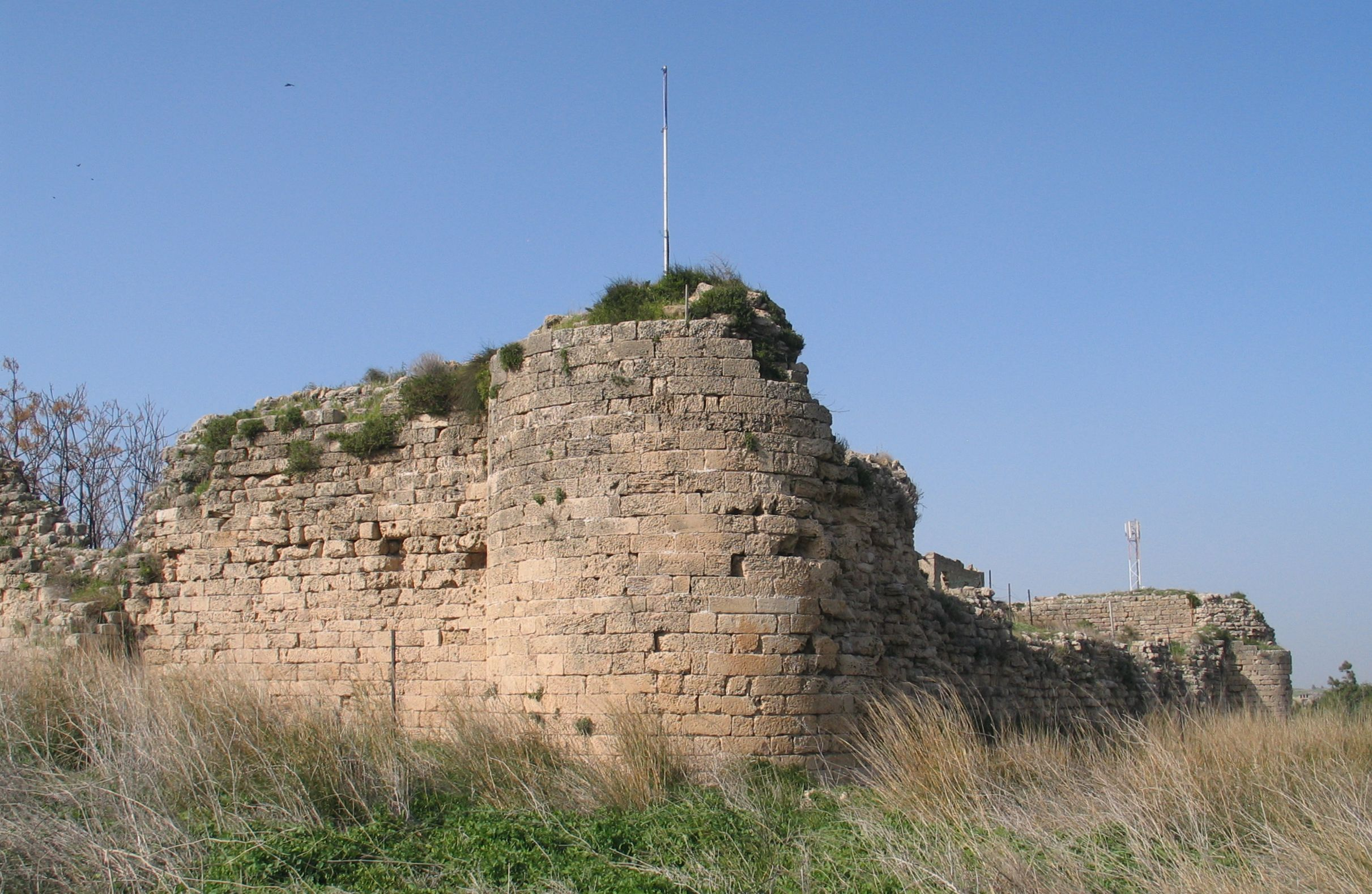
- Cafarlet from the southeast

Site information
- Controlled by: Early Muslim caliphates; Kingdom of Jerusalem; Knights Hospitaller; Knights Templar; Mamluk Sultanate; Ottoman Empire
- Open to the public: Accessible
- Condition: Ruin

Location
- Location within Israel
- Coordinates: 32°38′14.75″N 34°56′04.75″E

Cafarlet or Capharleth (Crusader name) or Kafr Lam (Arabic name) is an Early Muslim coastal fortress of the Roman castrum type. Today it is located inside Moshav HaBonim, Israel, on lands of the now abandoned Arab village of Kafr Lam. It was built in the 8th or 9th century, during the Umayyad or Abbasid period to serve as a ribat against Byzantine attacks, and was significantly modified and reused by the Crusaders. It is one of the few surviving ancient fortifications in Israel featuring round watchtowers, indicating the fortress' origins predate the crusader era. Most surviving ancient fortifications in the region feature rectangular watchtowers, typical of the style prevalent in Europe during the time of the crusaders.

== History ==
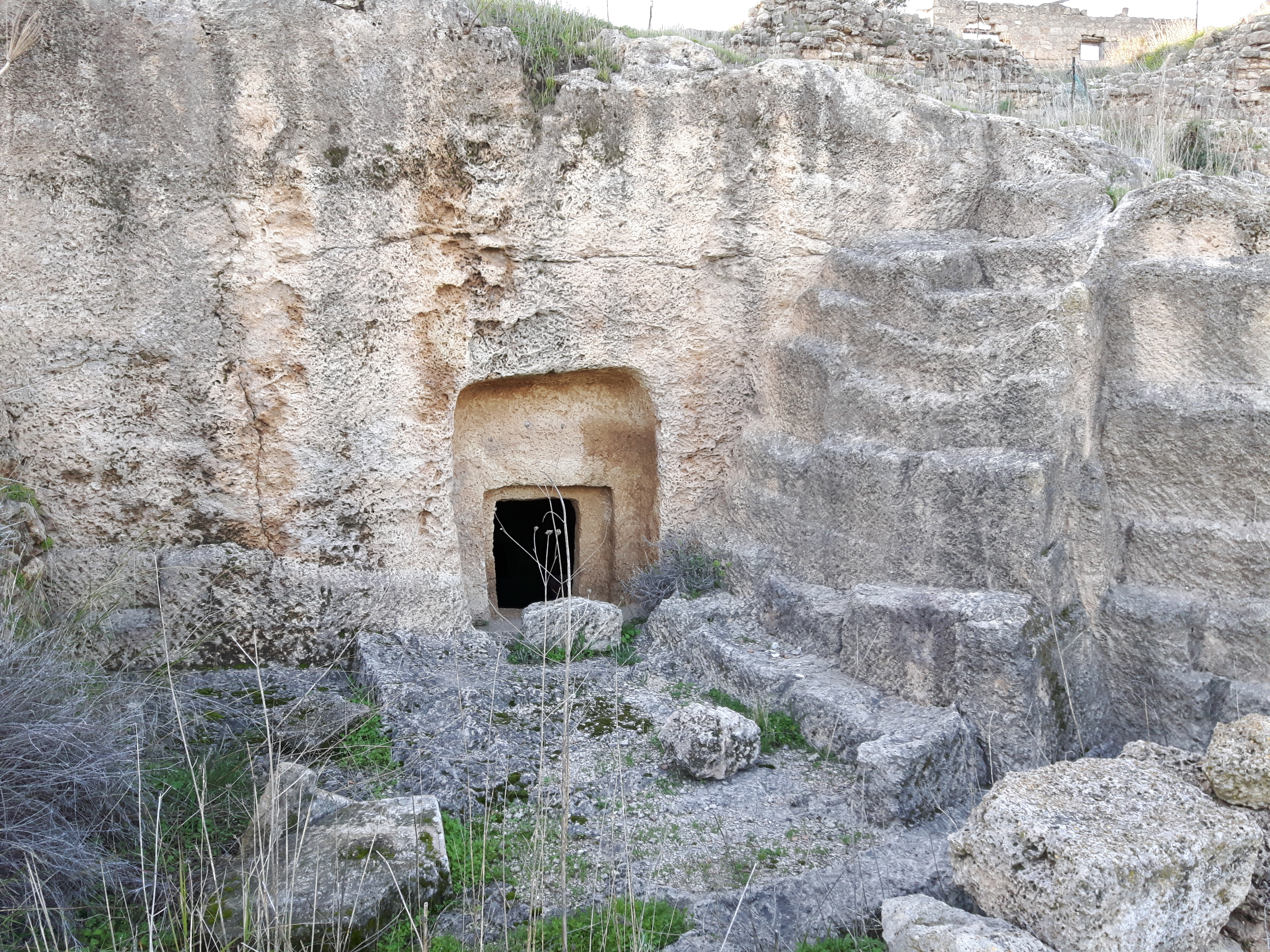
Burial cave, part of an old quarry

== See also ==
- HaBonim, Israel
