= Casalis =

Group of a few rural houses, in the open countryside, without walls

In the Middle Ages, a casalis or casale (Medieval Latin and Italian; Old French and Old Spanish casal), plural casalia (casali, casales), was "a cluster of houses in a rural setting". The word is not classical Latin, but derives from the Latin word casa, meaning "house". The term originated in western Europe and was also employed in the Crusader states. Depending on the situation, the terms feudum, villa and locum suburbanum could be synonyms. The word casale came into use in the eighth century to refer to an isolated rural tenement or demesne.

== Italy ==
The casale was the basic village unit in Tuscany from the tenth century on. They were highly discrete and stable units. During the eleventh century, churches (both public and private) proliferated and by the twelfth each casale seems to have had one, which probably fostered social cohesion and identity.

In the eleventh century, the Norman conquest of southern Italy brought disruption to settlement patterns. At the same time casalia begin appear in peninsular southern Italy. They were "interstitial" sites, located between walled villages and fortified towns, and being either undefended or protected by at most a ditch. The term casale was also used in Latin documents to refer to the small rural settlements of Islamic Sicily, called manzil or raḥl in Arabic.

In some cases, the establishment of casalia was undertaken by noblemen seeking to claim new land by resettling vacant areas. Successful casalia could grow to become castra (castles) or even walled towns with suburbs of their own. The established towns, however, successfully asserted their jurisdiction over casalia in their vicinity. The casalia only ceased to exist in the 18th and 19th centuries, when their inhabitants, the casalini, sought and received their own administrations.

== Crusader states ==
In the Crusader states in the Levant (1098–1291), the casale was the basic unit of rural settlement. There were about 600 in the Kingdom of Jerusalem, almost all of them bearing names of local origin. Most probably corresponded to previously existing divisions. In the Kingdom of Jerusalem, the curtile, an isolated farmstead, was rare. The casalia could have European, local Christian or Muslim inhabitants, and at least one is recorded as being inhabited by Samaritans. The smallest had just a few houses, while the largest were practically towns, although they lacked municipal institutions. Each had a manor house and a church, while most possessed common mills, ovens, cisterns, dovecotes, threshing floors, crofts and pastures. Some were associated with vineyards, springs, Bedouins and even defensive towers. The inhabitants were called villeins (villani or rustici) and each possessed a house and one or two carrucae, the basic unit of arable land.

In the Levant, villeins were typically free (i.e. non-servile). In practice, native villeins were tied to the land could not leave, and all villeins were required to use the communal installations, which belonged to the lord. Each casale had a headman, called a raʾīs in Arabic (raicius in Latin), elected by the families (ḥamāyil, singular ḥamūla). There was sometimes more than one raʾīs. He was an intermediary, representing the villeins to their usually absentee landlord and representing the lord to his fellow villeins. All administration was in the hands of the raʾīs, who supervised farming, collected taxes, administered justice and mediated disputes. He may have been assisted by a dragoman (which office was often hereditary) and sometimes a scribe (scribanus).

== Sources ==
- Boas, Adrian J. (2010). Domestic Settings: Sources on Domestic Architecture and Day-to-Day Activities in the Crusader States. Leiden: Brill.
- Boas, Adrian J. (2017). Crusader Archaeology: The Material Culture of the Latin East (2nd ed.). London: Routledge.
- Marin, Brigitte (2001). "Town and Country in the Kingdom of Naples, 1500–1800". In S. R. Epstein (ed.). Town and Country in Europe, 1300–1800. Cambridge University Press. pp. 316–31.
- Martin, Jean-Marie (2002). "Settlement and the Agrarian Economy". In G. A. Loud; A. Metcalfe (eds.). The Society of Norman Italy. Leiden: Brill. pp. 17–46.
- Migliario, Elvira (1992). "Terminologia e organizzazione agraria tra tardo antico e alto medioevo: ancora su fundus e casalis/casale". Athenaeum. 80 (2): 371–84.
- Preston, Helen Gertrude (1903). Rural Conditions in the Kingdom of Jerusalem during the Twelfth and Thirteenth Centuries (PhD thesis). Philadelphia: University of Pennsylvania.
- Wickham, Chris (1988). The Mountains and the City: The Tuscan Appennines In the Early Middle Ages. Oxford: Clarendon Press.
