= Lignages d'Outremer =

The Lignages d'Outremer ("Lineages of Outremer") describe the pedigrees of the most important Crusader families.

A first version was written in 1270 and is available in two manuscripts of the 14th century. A later version was produced in 1307/08, another in Italian, 1398 (Notizie sopra i Re di Gerusalemme e di Cipro e loro parentela etc.). It was compiled by Pierre de Flory (Piero de Fiorin), viscount of Nicosia, who probably also comes from Antioch, and Simon of Jerusalem, and was probably written in Cyprus. The lineages name more than a thousand people in the different versions. Among them are the Ibelin counts of Jaffa. It is included as an appendix to Recueil des historiens des croisades.

== Manuscripts ==
- Bibliothèque nationale de France, Paris (several manuscripts)
- Bavarian State Library, Munich (Codex Gallus 771)
- Vatican Library (Codex Vaticanus latinus 4789 and 7806 A)
- Biblioteca Marciana, Venice (app. 20^{265})

== Literature ==
- Wilpertus H. Rudt de Collenberg: A fragmentary copy of an unknown recension of the 'Lignages d'Outre-Mer' in the Vatican Library. In: English Historical Review 98, 1983, S. 311–327.
- Marie-Adélaïde Nielen-Vandevoorde: Un livre méconnu des Assises de Jérusalem: les Lignages d'outremer. In: Bibliothèque de l'école des chartes 153, 1995, S. 103-130
- Marie-Adélaïde Nielen: Lignages d'outremer: Introduction, notes et éditions critique. Paris, Académie des inscriptions et belles-lettres 2003. (Documents relating to the history of the Crusades 18) ISBN 2-87754-141-X
