= Aimery of Cyprus =

King of Jerusalem (1198–1205) and Cyprus (1196–1205)

Aimery
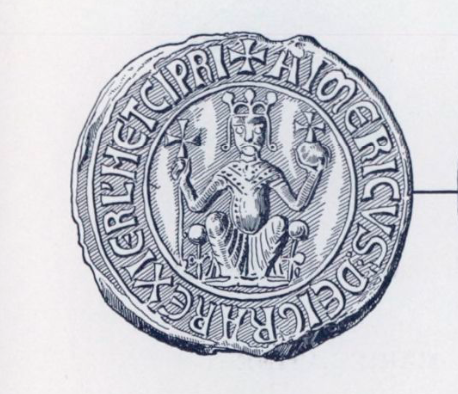
- Depiction of Aimery on his seal

Lord of Cyprus
- Reign: 1194–1196
- Predecessor: Guy

King of Cyprus
- Reign: 1196–1205
- Coronation: September 1197
- Successor: Hugh I

King of Jerusalem
- Reign: 1198–1205
- Coronation: January 1198
- Co-ruler: Isabella I
- Born: c. 1153
- Died: 1 April 1205 (aged 51–52)
- Spouses: Eschiva of Ibelin; Isabella I of Jerusalem
- Issue more...: Burgundia; Helvis, Princess of Antioch; Hugh I, King of Cyprus; Sibylla, Queen of Armenia; Melisende, Princess of Antioch
- House: Lusignan
- Father: Hugh VIII of Lusignan
- Mother: Burgundia of Rancon

Aimery of Lusignan (Latin: Aimericus, Greek: Αμωρί, Amorí; before 1155 – 1 April 1205), erroneously referred to as Amalric (French: Amaury) in earlier scholarship, (Note: Aimery's name was frequently mistranscribed as "Amalric" (French: Amaury), leading to him formerly being known as "Amalric II" and the true King Amalric as "Amalric I". No extant coins bearing Aimery's name survive. It is probable that the extant copies of the coins of Amalric were made and circulated during Aimery's reign, the two names having been similar enough to the people handling the coins for one to be accepted for the other. Even educated contemporaries confused the two names: the historian Marino Sanudo Torsello (c. 1270-1343) refers to both Amalric and Aimery, brothers of King Henry II of Cyprus, as Almericus.) was the first king of Cyprus from 1196 and the king of Jerusalem as the husband of Queen Isabella I from 1198 to his death. He was a capable ruler whose reign was a period of peace and stability in both kingdoms, and the progenitor of the Lusignan dynasty of the Kingdom of Cyprus.

Aimery was a younger son of Hugh VIII of Lusignan, a nobleman from Poitou. After participating in a rebellion against King Henry II of England in 1168, Aimery went to the Latin East and settled in the Kingdom of Jerusalem. Aimery's marriage to Eschiva of the influential Ibelin family strengthened his position in the kingdom. His younger brother Guy married Sibylla, the sister and heir presumptive of King Baldwin IV of Jerusalem. Baldwin made Aimery constable of Jerusalem around 1180. Guy and Sibylla became king and queen in 1186. Aimery was one of the commanders of the Christian army at the Battle of Hattin, which ended with a decisive defeat of Christians by the Muslim Ayyubids in 1187 and the subsequent near destruction of the kingdom.

Aimery supported King Guy when the latter besieged Acre and remained loyal to him after Queen Sibylla's death in 1190, when most barons insisted that the throne had passed to Sibylla's half-sister, Isabella I. Amid insurmountable unpopularity, Guy left for Cyprus in 1192 while Aimery remained in the kingdom as constable. Count Henry II of Champagne married Isabella and ruled alongside her. He arrested Aimery after discovering a plot to deliver the city of Tyre to Guy. Upon his release, Aimery joined Guy in Cyprus. When Guy died in 1194, the Cypriot nobles elected Aimery as their new lord. Aimery immediately sought to raise Cyprus to the status of a kingdom, with a government and institutions modelled after those of the Kingdom of Jerusalem. He acknowledged the suzerainty of Holy Roman Emperor Henry VI, who authorized Aimery's coronation as king of Cyprus in 1197.

Soon after they were both widowed, the barons of Jerusalem offered Aimery to marry Isabella and become king of Jerusalem too; he accepted and was crowned at her side. He kept the kingdoms of Cyprus and Jerusalem separate, but sent Cypriot troops to fight on the mainland, where he spent most of his reign. He sought to codify the laws of Jerusalem, resulting in the compilation of the Livre au roi. After surviving an assassination attempt in 1198, Aimery attempted to circumvent the law to banish Isabella's seneschal, Ralph of Saint-Omer, whom he thought responsible. He signed two consecutive truces with al-Adil I, the Ayyubid sultan of Egypt, the latter of which secured the Christian possession of the coastline from Acre to Antioch. The personal union of the kingdoms of Cyprus and Jerusalem ended when Aimery died of food poisoning; Cyprus passed to his only surviving son, Hugh I, while Isabella retained the Kingdom of Jerusalem.

== Early career ==
Aimery was born before 1155. He was the son of Hugh VIII of Lusignan, a lord from Poitou, and his wife, Burgundia of Rancon. The House of Lusignan was noted for generations of crusaders who had fought for the Holy Land in the Levant. His great-grandfather, Hugh VI of Lusignan, died in the Battle of Ramla in 1102; Aimery's grandfather, Hugh VII of Lusignan, took part in the Second Crusade. Aimery's father departed for the Levant in 1163, leaving his lands to be governed by Aimery's eldest brother, Hugh Brunus. The elder Hugh was captured by Muslims at the Battle of Harim and died in captivity in the 1160s.

In 1168 Aimery joined a rebellion against his family's suzerain, King Henry II of England. The Lusignan brothers ambushed Henry's wife, Eleanor of Aquitaine, as she travelled to Poitiers and killed the leader of her guard, Patrick, earl of Salisbury. Shortly after the rebellion, Aimery left Poitou for the Levant and settled in the Kingdom of Jerusalem. He was captured in battle by Muslims and held in Damascus. According to a 13th-century tradition, King Amalric of Jerusalem ransomed Aimery; people were fascinated by the similarity of their names and the story entered the folklore of the Latin East.

Aimery secured his position in the Latin East by marrying Eschiva of Ibelin, the elder daughter of the lord of Ramla, Baldwin of Ibelin, one of the most powerful noblemen in the Kingdom of Jerusalem. According to Ernoul, whose reliability in this instance is questionable, Aimery became a lover of King Amalric's former wife, Agnes of Courtenay. Ernoul consistently portrays Agnes unfavorably; his information about her probably came from her rival Maria Komnene, Amalric's second wife. King Amalric died on 11 July 1174 and was succeeded by his and Agnes's thirteen-year-old son, Baldwin IV. Aimery became a member of the royal court with his father-in-law's support. He may have been appointed chamberlain, which would indicate a close relationship with the royal family.

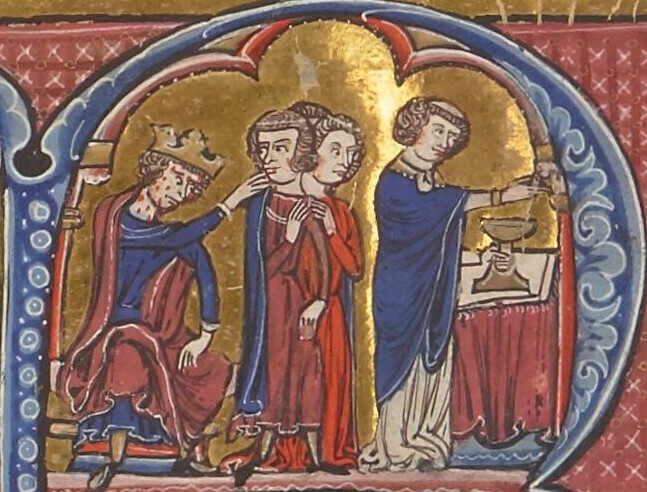
Baldwin IV had his sister, Sibylla, marry Aimery's brother Guy. One chronicle credits Aimery with the match.

Aimery's youngest brother, Guy, married Baldwin IV's widowed sister, Sibylla, in April 1180. Ernoul writes that Sibylla had promised herself to Aimery's father-in-law, Baldwin of Ibelin, but Aimery had described Guy as a handsome and charming young man to her and her mother, Agnes, and then travelled to Poitou in the winter of 1179/1180 and brought Guy to Jerusalem. Another source, William of Tyre, does not accord to Aimery any role in Guy and Sibylla's marriage. The historian Bernard Hamilton dismisses this account and argues that King Baldwin arranged the match. Because the young king had lepromatous leprosy, Sibylla was his heir presumptive and Guy's marriage to her put him in line to become the next king, much to the dismay of the Ibelins and their allies.

== Constableship ==
=== Baronial division ===
By 24 February 1182, Aimery had become constable of Jerusalem, the highest military authority in the kingdom after the King. He may have been granted the office shortly after his predecessor, Humphrey II of Toron, died in April 1179; alternatively, his appointment may have only come around 1181, as the consequence of the growing influence of his brother Guy. Aimery's legal ability may have developed during his long tenure in public office.

In 1183 King Baldwin IV appointed Guy regent. As regent, Guy was also the commander-in-chief of the royal army. Saladin, the Ayyubid sultan of Egypt and Syria, launched a campaign against the kingdom on 29 September. Aimery defeated Saladin's troops in a minor skirmish with the support of his father-in-law, Baldwin, and Baldwin's brother Balian of Ibelin. After the victory, the crusaders' main army could advance as far as a spring near Saladin's camp, forcing him to retreat nine days later. Both William of Tyre and Ernoul were disappointed that the Christian army did not engage the Muslims. During the campaign, it became apparent that other military leaders were unwilling to cooperate with Guy. The ailing king dismissed Guy from regency and had his five-year-old nephew Baldwin V, Sibylla's son from her first marriage, crowned co-king on 20 November 1183.

In early 1185, Baldwin IV decreed that the pope, the Holy Roman emperor and the kings of France and England were to choose between his sister, Sibylla, and half-sister, Isabella, if Baldwin V died before reaching the age of majority. Baldwin IV died in 1185, followed by Baldwin V in mid-1186. Ignoring Baldwin IV's decree and the protests of Guy's opponents, led by Aimery's Ibelin in-laws, Sibylla's partisans proclaimed her queen and she crowned Guy king. Aimery was among Sibylla's supporters. Aimery's father-in-law, Baldwin of Ibelin, left the kingdom rather than pay homage to Guy.

=== Hattin and the Third Crusade ===
As constable, Aimery organised the army of the Kingdom of Jerusalem into units before the Battle of Hattin, which ended with the decisive victory of Saladin on 4 July 1187. Along with most commanders of the Christian army, Aimery was captured on the battlefield. The victory enabled Saladin to conquer almost all of the Latin East; the only city in the kingdom that remained in Christian hands was Tyre. During the siege of Ascalon, Saladin promised the defenders that he would set free ten persons whom they named if they surrendered. Aimery and Guy were among those whom the defenders named before surrendering on 4 September, but Saladin postponed their release until early 1188. In response to the Christian losses, kings Richard I of England and Philip II of France led the Third Crusade to the Levant. Geoffrey of Lusignan, brother of Aimery and Guy, arrived with this crusade.

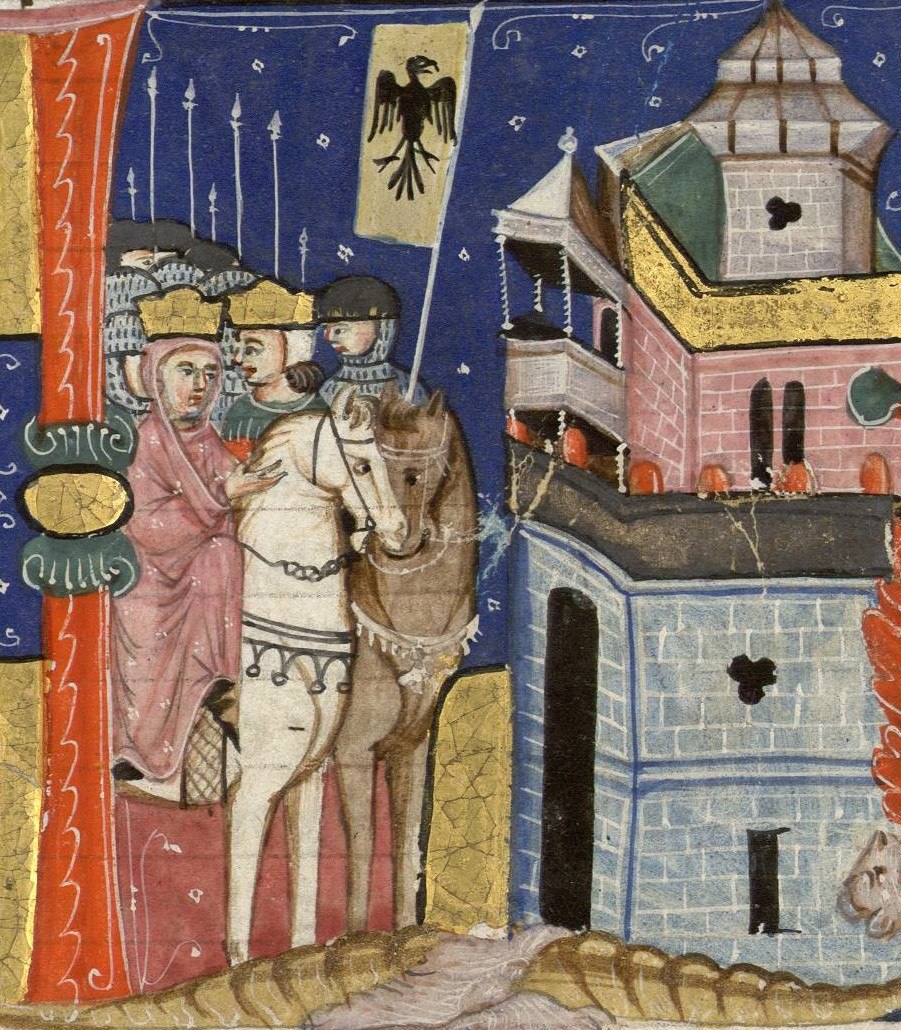
After Sibylla died in the middle of the Third Crusade, Guy's opponents sought to dislodge him from the kingdom. Aimery remained loyal to his brother.

In 1189 Guy gathered a force and laid a siege to Acre. Aimery and Geoffrey supported him during the siege. Most barons held that Guy lost his claim to kingship when Sibylla and their daughters died in late 1190, but Aimery remained loyal to his brother. The Ibelins supported Marquis Conrad of Montferrat, the defender of Tyre, who married Sibylla's half-sister, Isabella, in late November. King Richard supported the Lusignans, and made Geoffrey count of Jaffa in 1191. An assembly of the noblemen unanimously declared Conrad the lawful king on 16 April 1192. Conrad was murdered twelve days later, and Isabella hastily married Count Henry II of Champagne, whom the barons had selected to rule the kingdom. To compensate him for the loss of the kingdom, Richard I authorized Guy to purchase the island of Cyprus–which Richard I had conquered from its Byzantine governor, Isaac Komnenos, in May 1191–from the Knights Templar. Guy was to pay 40,000 bezants to Richard, who granted the right to collect the sum to Henry. Guy settled in Cyprus in early May. The Third Crusade ended in September with the Kingdom of Jerusalem regaining a narrow strip of land along the coast of Palestine from Jaffa to Tyre. Saladin, the crusaders' greatest enemy, died in March 1193.

Aimery remained in the Kingdom of Jerusalem as constable. When Geoffrey returned to France, Aimery claimed Jaffa. He paid homage to Isabella, but apparently not to her new husband, Henry, who doubted his loyalty. In May 1193, Henry discovered that the Pisan merchants had been plotting to deliver Tyre to Guy and clamped down on them. Aimery intervened on behalf of the Pisans and Henry had him imprisoned in the citadel of Acre. Aimery insisted that Henry had no right to imprison a vassal and constable, while Henry refused to recognize Aimery's constableship and denied that Aimery was his vassal. In exchange for Aimery's freedom, Henry demanded that Guy surrender Cyprus. Despite his long association with his unpopular brother, Aimery was well-liked by the barons, who–together with the grand masters of the Templars and the Hospitallers–prevailed on Henry to release him. After regaining his freedom, Aimery followed the example of the other Lusignan partisans and left for the kingdom for Cyprus, abandoning both his office and the fief of Jaffa. Henry then granted the constableship to Isabella's half-brother, John of Ibelin.

== Reign ==
=== Lord of Cyprus ===
==== Consollidation ====
Guy made Aimery constable of Cyprus. He died in late 1194, having bequeathed Cyprus to Geoffrey. Richard had granted Cyprus to Guy for life, but neither the English king nor his nephew Henry of Champagne, to whom he had transferred his rights, claimed the reversion. Geoffrey showed no interest in ruling in the Latin East and had already returned to Poitou. Guy's vassals elected Aimery to be their new lord. Henry demanded, as the ruler of the Kingdom of Jerusalem, to be consulted about the succession in Cyprus, but was ignored.

Upon succeeding his brother, Aimery realized that the treasury was almost empty because Guy had granted most landed property on the island to his supporters. He summoned his vassals to an assembly. After pointing out that each of them was richer than him, he persuaded them one by one "either by force, or by friendship, or by agreement" to surrender some of their rents and lands. By the end of his reign, the revenues of Cyprus had increased to at least 200,000 bezants. Aimery continued Guy's work on the island's fortresses. Guy's entourage, including Rainier of Gibelet, became part of Aimery's court in Cyprus. They were joined by new arrivals, many of whom were Aimery's fellow Poitevins, including Aimery of Rivet, who became seneschal, and Reynald Barlais.

==== Church and crown ====
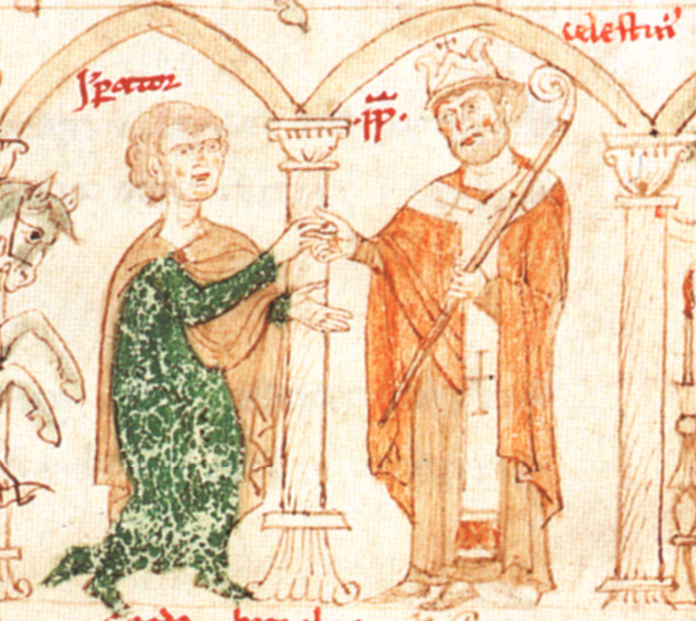
With the help of Pope Celestine III and Emperor Henry VI, Aimery worked on establishing Cyprus as a kingdom.

When Aimery assumed the rule over Cyprus, the island only had Greek Orthodox bishops. In 1195 Aimery dispatched the archdeacon of Laodicea, known only by the initial B., to Pope Celestine III, to request the establishment of a Latin Church hierarchy on Cyprus. This was probably seen as a condition for raising Cyprus to the status of a kingdom. To be recognized as a king, a ruler had to receive a crown from either an emperor or the Pope. At about the same the archdeacon of Laodicea left for Rome, Aimery dispatched his vassal Rainier of Gibelet to Holy Roman Emperor Henry VI, who was preparing to lead a new crusade. Aimery proposed acknowledging the Emperor's suzerainty if the Emperor recognized him as king. He was prompted by the concern that the Byzantines would attempt to recover Cyprus; additionally, obtaining a crown would enhance his prestige, secure Cyprus for his descendants, and quash any suggestions that the island should be considered dependent on the Kingdom of Jerusalem.

Aimery's envoy Rainier of Gibelet swore loyalty to Henry VI on behalf of Aimery in Gelnhausen in October 1195. The Emperor promised that he would personally crown Aimery and tasked the archbishops of Brindisi and Trani with delivering a golden sceptre to Aimery. Henry VI's envoys landed in Cyprus in April or May 1196. Aimery may have adopted the title of king around that time, as Pope Celestine had styled him as king in a letter in December 1196. At that time the Pope set up the archbishopric of Nicosia, of which the first incumbent was Aimery's chancellor, Alan, and the suffragan dioceses of Paphos, Limassol, and Famagusta. Aimery's coronation was postponed to allow Henry VI to arrive.

==== Relations with neighbors ====
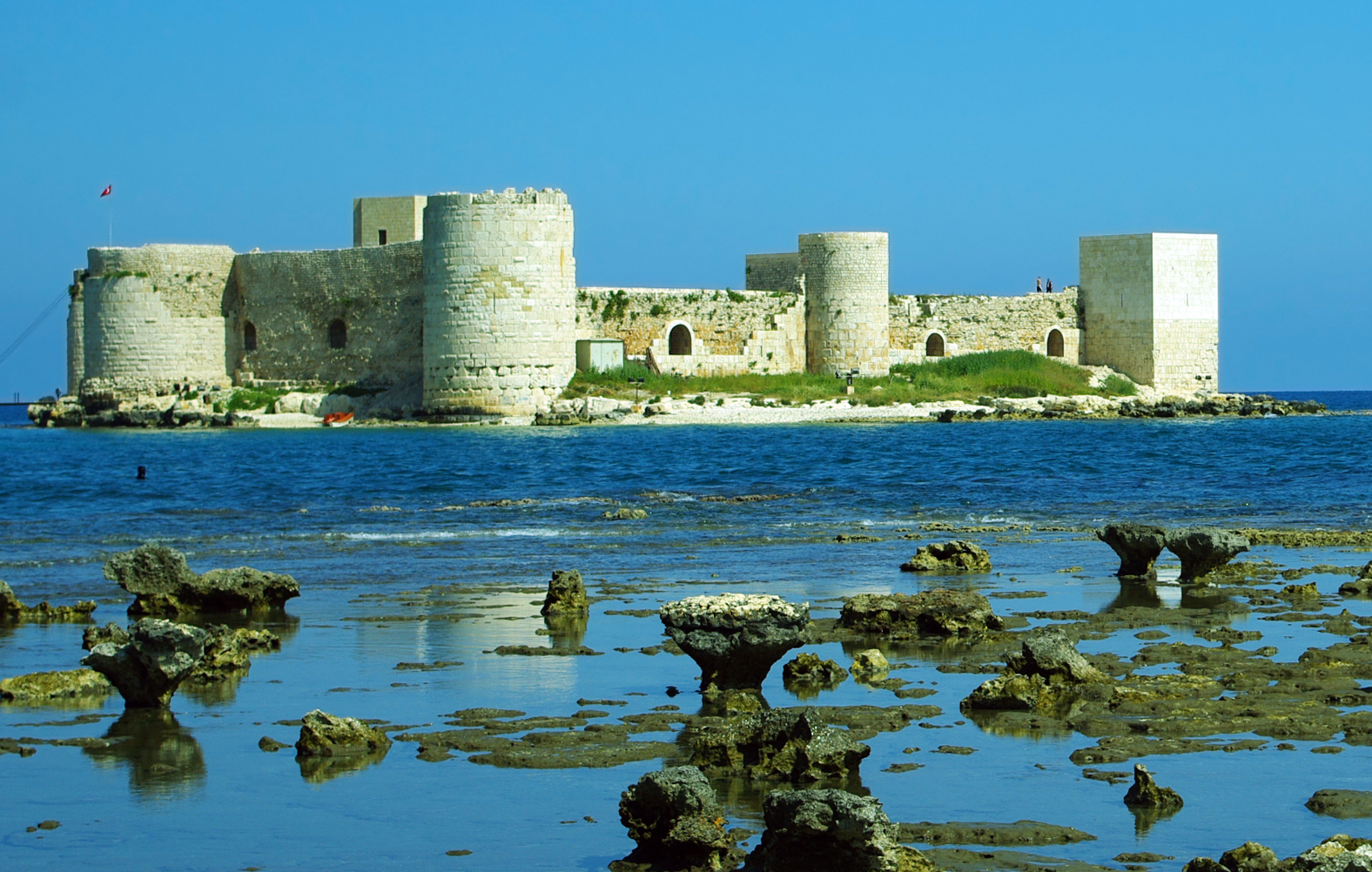
Aimery retrieved his wife and children from the Corycus fortress after their abduction by a pirate.

In the mid-1190s, Aimery's wife, Eschiva, was at the coast recovering from an illness when she and their children were abducted by the pirate Kanakes, whom Aimery had put a bounty on. They were taken to Antiochetta and held as hostages. Their release was secured by the lord of Armenian Cilicia, Leo II. He housed them in the fortress of Corycus, where Aimery soon came to retrieve them. The incident helped establish friendly relations between Aimery and Leo II. Leo II invited Aimery, his family, and his men to stay for a feast, but they had to leave when the weather started to change; a storm at sea followed, and William of Tyre's continuator believes that they would have died if they had been caught in it. Eschiva, having been in poor health, died shortly after her release. She and Aimery had had six children: Burgundia, Alice, Helvis, John, Guy, and Hugh.

A truce between the Kingdom of Jerusalem and the Ayyubid Sultanate expired in 1196 and the kingdom, already a rump state, was in danger of renewed attacks. Its barons and merchants felt that the rivalry between Henry of Champagne and Aimery was detrimental to both states. Some, such as the Bethsan family, held land and privileges in Cyprus as well, while many of the most prominent figures were related to Aimery's wife. The Bethsan family were among those who urged Henry to reconcile with Aimery. Henry thus visited Aimery on Cyprus in 1197. The two rulers made peace and even forged an alliance, whereby the three sons of Aimery and Eschiva were betrothed to the three daughters of Henry and Isabella. It is possible that Aimery was restored to the office of constable of Jerusalem at this point because he used the title again in November. As part of the settlement, Isabella and Henry promised that Jaffa would be restored to the Lusignans as dowry and Aimery's debt to Henry for the purchase of Cyprus was remitted. The Ayyubids invaded during the negotiations, and Aimery promptly sent Reynald Barlais to take possession of Jaffa.

=== Kingship ===
==== Crusade and coronations ====
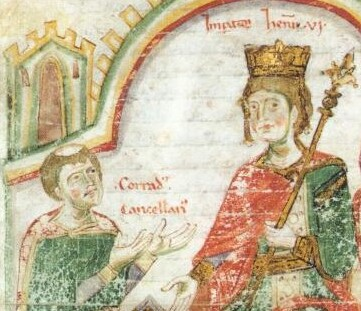
Aimery was crowned by Emperor Henry VI's chancellor, Conrad, because Henry was too ill to come and do it himself.

A rebellion in Sicily and a subsequent illness prevented Emperor Henry VI's departure to the Latin East. His chancellor, Conrad of Querfurt, bishop of Hildesheim, set sail ahead of him. Conrad crowned Aimery in Nicosia in September 1197 and received homage from the newly made king. Henry VI died that month and the Holy Roman Empire was plunged into a long succession war, leaving Aimery without the alliance he had desired. Henry of Champagne also died in September, having fallen from a window of his palace in Acre, only weeks after reconciling with Aimery. Aimery's garrison at Jaffa was not able to resist the Ayyubid attack and Jaffa was lost again shortly after Henry of Champagne's death. This was the first instance of a king of Cyprus intervening militarily on behalf of the mainland kingdom.

Immediately after the death of Henry of Champagne, the barons of Jerusalem demanded that his widow, Isabella, seek a fourth husband, who would rule the kingdom.The aristocratic-yet-impoverished seneschal of Jerusalem, Ralph of Saint-Omer, was a candidate, but the masters of the military orders opposed him vehemently. Archbishop Conrad of Mainz arrived in Acre on 20 September and proposed that the throne should be offered to Aimery. Aimery would have been an attractive candidate because of his Cypriot resources, and the Germans likely appreciated that he was an imperial vassal. Since Aimery's first wife, Eschiva, had recently died, he was free to marry Isabella. Archbishop Joscius of Tyre led the negotiations. Patriarch Aymar of Jerusalem initially complained that the marriage would be uncanonical. The marriage, or at least a betrothal, was celebrated in October.

Sensing an opportunity while the Ayyubids were preoccupied with Jaffa, Aimery assisted the German and Brabancon crusaders commanded by Duke Henry I of Brabant in recovering Beirut and Sidon in October 1197. Sidon had been destroyed by the time they arrived, and they captured Beirut on 21 October after forcing the Ayyubid ruler of Damascus, al-Adil I, to withdraw. Toron was besieged in November. The patriarch withdrew his objections to the marriage of Aimery and Isabella and crowned them in January 1198. When news of Emperor Henry VI's death reached the Levant, the Germans decided to return home, and the siege of Toron was abandoned on 2 February. The Germans left behind a new military order, the Teutonic Knights, to whom Aimery granted the Gate of St Nicholas in Acre on the condition that they return it at the King's request. Pope Celestine III's successor, Innocent III, immediately began preaching a new crusade.

==== Governance and legislation ====
The eastern Mediterranean in 1197

King Aimery spent more time at Acre than in Nicosia. He did not hesitate to send Cypriot troops to fight on the mainland, but declared that he could not maintain the army of the Kingdom of Jerusalem from his own treasury. The government and laws of Cyprus were modelled after those of Jerusalem, and a High Court of Cyprus was established as an equivalent to the High Court of Jerusalem. These institutions remained separate, as did the chanceries; the two kingdoms were linked only by the King's person and he made no attempts to unite them. Cyprus was Aimery's and was to pass to his heirs, while in Jerusalem he owed his kingship to Queen Isabella. Isabella already had an heir, her eldest daughter, Maria of Montferrat, and three more daughters, Maria, Alice, and Philippa of Champagne.

Aimery was in no haste to make significant changes to his wife's advisors, nor did he try to curtail the influence of the men who had served her previous husband, Henry. He relied much on Baldwin of Bethsan, constable of Cyprus, who often accompanied him on the mainland. He thought highly of the senechal of Jerusalem, Ralph of Saint-Omer, but did not like him. According to a later tradition, Ralph was the only man who knew the laws of the Kingdom of Jerusalem better than Aimery. The King sought to preserve and codify what was remembered of the laws and he wanted to delegate the task to a commission under his presidency. He requested Ralph's assistance, but Ralph took no part in the endeavor. The resulting Livre au roi dealt with, among other things, the rights and obligations of the queen regnant and her husband, the succession rights of her children, and the question of regency in case of her death–issues which were of particular concern at the time.

In March 1198, Aimery and his court were travelling from Acre and riding through the orchards of Tyre when four German horsemen galloped up to the King and attacked him. His retainers rescued him, but the attackers refused to say who had hired them. While recovering, Aimery became convinced that Ralph of Saint-Omer, lately his rival for Isabella's hand and the throne, stood behind the attack. Aimery convoked a full session of the High Court of Jerusalem, at which he sentenced Ralph to banishment, apparently referencing an assise of King Baldwin III that allowed the king to punish a treacherous vassal without trial. Ralph insisted that the Assise sur la ligece entitled him to be tried by his peers. The High Court tried to persuade Aimery to grant a trial and threatened to withdraw their knights from his service if he refused, which they did. The matter was only resolved when Ralph announced that he would leave the kingdom voluntarily because he had lost the King's goodwill. This incident may have precluded Ralph from participating in Aimery's compilation of the laws of the kingdom.

==== Foreign relations ====
Aimery pursued an active and adaptable foreign policy, and maintained good relations with the merchant republics of Europe to strengthen the economy. He signed a truce with al-Adil on 1 July 1198, securing the possession of the coast from Acre as far as to Antioch for the crusaders for five years and eight months. Aimery was left with Beirut, al-Adil with Jaffa, and Sidon was divided between them. Al-Adil took control of Egypt in November and, with a succession war brewing in Antioch, Aimery became all the more eager to keep the peace. He was dismayed by the struggle between Leo II of Armenia and Count Bohemond of Tripoli for the succession to Prince Bohemond III of Antioch, and he pressured Cardinal Soffred to mediate. Aimery sympathised with the Armenians, but did not intervene.

Aimery continued to fear that the Byzantines might attempt to reclaim Cyprus; his ambassadors at the papal court voiced this concern in early 1199. In the early 1200s the Byzantine emperor, Alexios III Angelos, also turned to Pope Innocent III. Alexios III feared that Constantinople would become the target of the Fourth Crusade and promised that he would help the crusaders fight in the Holy Land if the Pope forced Aimery to hand the island to the Byzantines under the pain of excommunication. The Pope was anxious that Aimery's efforts to secure the Holy Land not be disturbed and refused Alexios III, arguing that the Byzantines had lost their right to Cyprus when Richard I of England conquered the island in 1191. Alexios III did not press the issue again, but Innocent III mentioned his designs to Kings John of England and Philip II of France and urged them to send help to Cyprus and the Holy Land.

In 1202, groups of men split off from the Fourth Crusade arrived in Acre. Reynald II of Dampierre, who arrived at the head of 300 French crusaders, demanded that Aimery break off the treaties with the Muslims and launch a campaign. Aimery told him that more than 300 soldiers were needed to wage war against the Ayyubids and that he would wait for the rest of the crusaders. Reynald called him a coward to his face and left to join Bohemond of Tripoli. In 1203 another crusader, Thierry of Flanders, landed in Cyprus and came before Aimery. He demanded that Cyprus be turned over to him in right of his wife, a daughter of the island's former ruler, Isaac Komnenos. He was brusquely ordered to leave.

Aimery launched one reprisal against the Muslims during the truce. An Egyptian emir seized a fortress near Sidon and plundered the neighbouring Christian territory. As al-Adil failed to force the emir to respect the truce, Aimery sent a retaliatory fleet that seized 20 Egyptian ships; afterwards he led the barons, the Temmplars, and the Hospitallers on raids into the Ayyubid land of Galilee. In response, al-Adil's son al-Mu'azzam Isa plundered the region of Acre. Each side took care to avoid a clash: Aimery held back awaiting the crusade's arrival, while al-Adil sought not to provoke it. In May 1204, Aimery exhibited further naval strength when his fleet sacked Fuwwah, a small Ayyubid town on the Nile Delta.

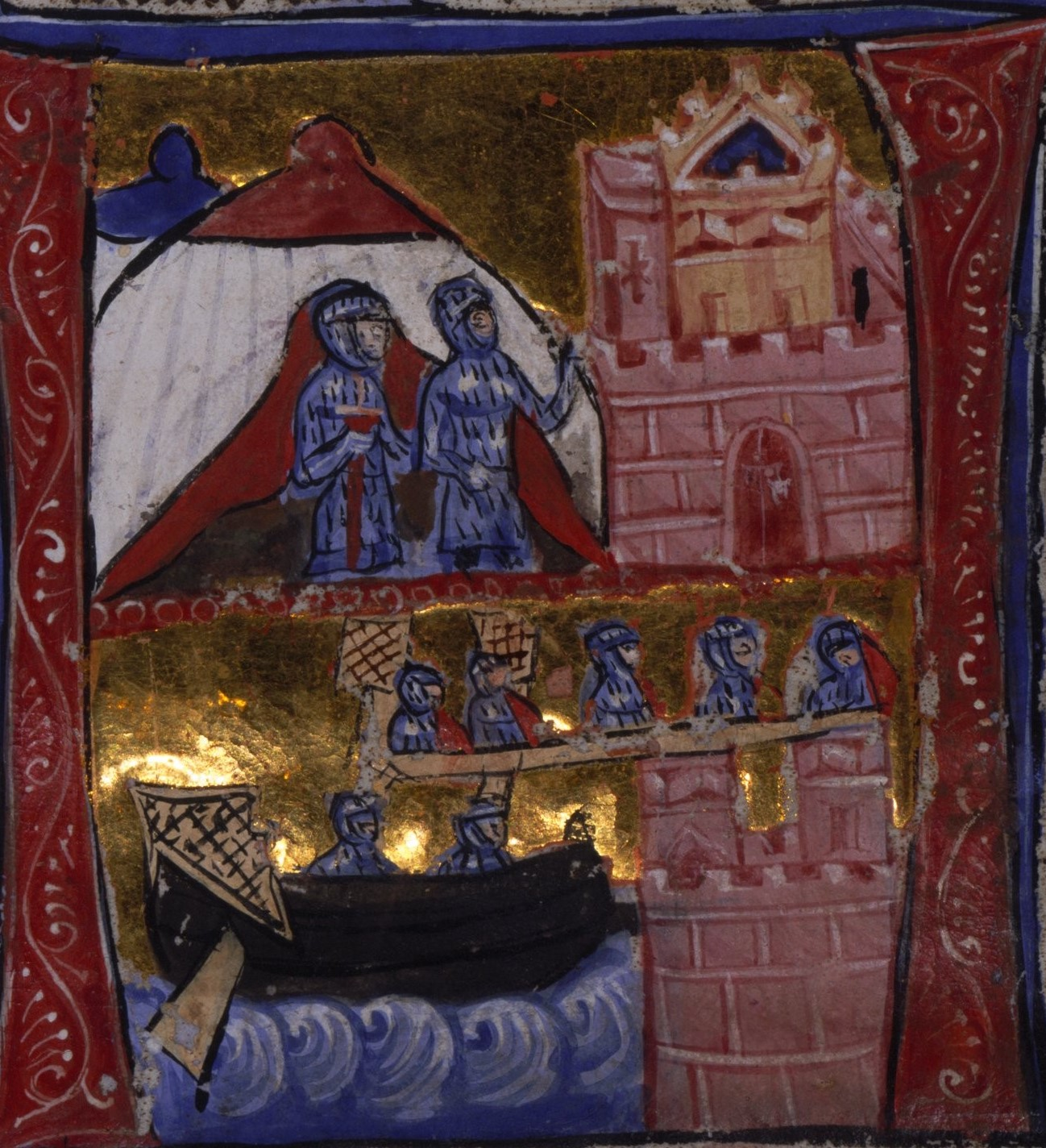
When the Fourth Crusade targeted Constantinople instead of assisting him, Aimery negotiated another truce with the Muslims.

The Fourth Crusade ended up diverted to Constantinople, bringing no benefit to the Kingdom of Jerusalem. Aimery's reaction to the crusade's sack of Constantinople and the subsequent establishment of the Latin Empire is not known, but it provoked resentment and dismay in the Latin East. As no new armies would arrive to support him, Aimery proposed a peace, which al-Adil gladly accepted. A new truce for six years was signed in September 1204. Under the terms of the treaty, al-Adil ceded Jaffa and the Ayyubid portions of Sidon and Ramla to the Kingdom of Jerusalem and simplified the Christian pilgrims' visits to Jerusalem and Nazareth. Aimery arranged for the widowed lady of Sidon, Helvis of Ibelin, to marry the crusader Guy of Montfort, who thus took up rule over the newly conquered town in the name of Helvis's son, Balian.

==== Family, death, and succession ====
Aimery and Isabella's marriage produced two more daughters, Sibylla and Melisende, and a son, Amalric, who stood to succeed to the throne of Jerusalem. While the children of his first marriage were given typical Lusignan names, Aimery's children with Isabella were named after her relatives. This, as well as the consistent references to Isabella as the daughter of King Amalric in Aimery's charters, suggests that Aimery strove to position himself and their children as part of her dynasty. Of the children Aimery had had with Eschiva, only Burgundia, Helvis, and Hugh survived their father; John and Guy died young, as did Alice, who had leprosy. Around 1202 Aimery gave Burgundia in marriage to the crusader Walter of Montbéliard. Aimery wished to name his new son-in-law and favourite to the office of constable of Jerusalem so that he could command the army in his absence. To do this, he granted Beirut to John of Ibelin in return for John's resignation from constableship.

The young Amalric, son of Aimery and Isabella, died on 2 February 1205. Amalric's death precluded the establishment of the Lusignan dynasty in the mainland kingdom. After eating an excess of white mullet, King Aimery himself fell seriously ill. He died in Acre shortly after on 1 April. His body was taken to Cyprus and buried in the Cathedral of Saint Sophia in Nicosia. Aimery was succeeded in Cyprus by his only surviving son, 9-year-old Hugh I. Queen Isabella died shortly after, and her kingdom passed to her eldest daughter, Maria of Montferrat. Of the three marriages Aimery had planned with Henry of Champagne, only one could be celebrated, that of King Hugh I to Henry's daughter Alice in 1210; it "bore its dynastic fruit in time to come".

Aimery's kinship and affinity with the rulers of the Latin East

Agnes of Courtenay	Amalric of Jerusalem	Maria Komnene	Balian of Ibelin	Baldwin of Ibelin	Geoffrey of Lusignan
John of Ibelin	Philip of Ibelin	Helvis of Ibelin
Guy of Lusignan	Sibylla of Jerusalem	Baldwin IV of Jerusalem
Aimery of Cyprus	Eschiva of Ibelin	John of Ibelin	Balian of Sidon
Conrad of Montferrat	Isabella I of Jerusalem	Henry II of Champagne
Baldwin V of Jerusalem	Hugh I of Cyprus	Helvis of Cyprus	Burgundia of Cyprus
Maria of Montferrat	Alice of Champagne	Philippa of Champagne	Sibylla of Cyprus	Melisende of Cyprus

== Legacy ==
The historian Mary Nickerson Hardwicke describes Aimery as a "self-assured, politically astute, sometimes hard, seldom sentimentally indulgent" ruler. His reign was a period of peace and consolidation, and he laid the foundations for the prosperity that Cyprus enjoyed under his successors. For the historian Steven Runciman, Aimery was "not a great king", but "had a political wisdom that was very valuable". Runciman underlines that Aimery succeeded in preserving the mainland kingdom's monarchy; Hardwicke notes that he failed to strengthen it, although "it was not his fault".

Among those who knew him, Aimery inspired little affection but commanded respect. The lawyers of the Kingdom of Jerusalem held him in high esteem. One of them, John of Ibelin, emphasized that Aimery had governed both Cyprus and Jerusalem "well and wisely" until his death.

== Notes ==
Aimery of Cyprus House of Lusignan Born: c. 1153 Died: 1 April 1205
Regnal titles
Preceded by Guy	Lord of Cyprus; 1194–1196	Became king
Became king	King of Cyprus; 1196–1205	Succeeded by Hugh I
Preceded by Isabella I as uncrowned ruler	King of Jerusalem; 1198–1205 with Isabella I	Succeeded by Isabella I as sole ruler
Political offices
Preceded by Humphrey II of Toron	Constable of Jerusalem; 1179/1181–1194	Succeeded by John of Ibelin
