= Gastria Castle =

Ruined castle in Northern Cyprus

Coordinates: 35.3240°N 33.9796°E

- (Greek: Κάστρο της Γαστριάς Turkish: Gastria Kalesi)
- Interactive map of the Gastria Castle area

General information
- Architectural style: Medieval
- Location: de jure Cyprus de facto Northern Cyprus

Gastria Castle (Greek: Κάστρο της Γαστριάς Turkish: Gastria Kalesi) is a ruined castle in Northern Cyprus. It is first mentioned in 1210 as a Knights Templar fortress. It was dismantled in 1279 by Hugh III of Cyprus. It passed into the possession of the Knights Hospitaller in 1308, falling into obscurity afterwards.

== History ==
The castle was situated on the northern side of Famagusta Bay, 3 kilometres (1.9 miles) to the south-west of Gastria village. In 1191, Cyprus was taken by Richard the Lionheart during his campaign against the island's ruler Isaac Komnenos of Cyprus. Richard subsequently sold the island to the Knights Templar, whose rule abruptly ended after a major revolt in Nicosia. Cyprus was then resold to Guy of Lusignan. Gastria Castle is first mentioned in 1210, when the royal regent Walter of Montbéliard sought refuge in the fortress with his allies the Templars. He had previously refused to render an account of his administration of the royal treasury to the newly crowned Hugh I of Cyprus, subsequently fleeing to the Kingdom of Jerusalem. A period of peace ended with the death of Hugh in 1218.

A struggle over who should act as the kingdom's regent ensued, pitting the House of Ibelin with the local supporters of Frederick II, Holy Roman Emperor against the House of Lusignan. Frederick's arrival in Limassol in 1228 escalated the conflict into an open war. In 1229, John of Ibelin, the Old Lord of Beirut returned to Cyprus through Gastria's port. In 1232, after a defeat at the Battle of Agridi, Frederick's few remaining supporters requested permission to hide in Gastria. Having fought Frederick at Acre in 1229 the Templars refused and those who attempted to hide in the ditch were apprehended. Afterwards, the Lusignans continued their reign interrupted only by occasional palace coups. In 1279, Hugh III of Cyprus dismantled the castle and expelled the Templars, after the latter declared their support for Charles I of Naples. In 1308, the castle was granted to the Knights Hospitaller. In 1310, Henry II of Jerusalem passed through Gastria while en route to his exile to Armenia. It was no longer mentioned as a castle from that point on.

== Architecture ==
Gastria was a small rectangular fort located at the end of a long narrow ridge. It was separated from the ridge by a rock-cut ditch 7.9–4.5 metres (26–15 ft) wide and 2–2.6 metres (6.6–8.5 ft) deep. The ditch was once crossed by a drawbridge or a wooden bridge. True to the characteristics of small Templar fortresses, Gastria had no towers. The center of the fort housed a circular cistern. To the east a natural vantage point in the form of a rocky outcrop overlooking both the sea and the fort bears signs that it was once occupied. The outcrop was once separated from the fort by a channel that is now filled in. To the north of the fort, the outcrop and the isthmus, is a watercourse that served as a harbor.
