= Burgundia of Cyprus =

Heir presumptive to the Kingdom of Cyprus

Burgundia of Cyprus (French: Bourgogne) was a member of the House of Lusignan who was the heir presumptive to the Kingdom of Cyprus between 1205 and 1214 or 1215.

Burgundia was the elder daughter of Aimery of Lusignan and his first wife, Eschiva of Ibelin. Her parents married in the 1170s. In 1194, her father became the ruler of Cyprus, and was crowned king in 1197. Eschiva and her children were abducted by the pirate Kanakes from the seaside village of Paradhisi, where she had gone to recuperate from an illness. They were promptly released thanks to the intervention from the lord of Armenian Cilicia, Leo I.

In older historiography, Burgundia was said to have married and divorced Count Raymond VI of Toulouse, but is now thought to have been confused with the Byzantine "damsel of Cyprus", who did marry Raymond. Burgundia's husband was Walter of Montbéliard, a crusader whom her father had appointed constable of Jerusalem. This marriage took place after October 1200.

Because two of her brothers–Guy and John–died young, Burgundia became the heir presumptive when her father died and her sole surviving brother, the young Hugh I, became king of Cyprus. Because Burgundia was first in line to the throne, her husband, Walter of Montbéliard, took up the government of the kingdom in Hugh's name as regent. Burgundia and Walter had a daughter, Eschiva. Walter made numerous enemies among the nobles of Cyprus during his regency. In 1210, Burgundia's brother reached the age of majority and Walter's regency ended. After Hugh demanded that he render account of his regency, Walter and Burgundia fled in the night with their household and as much gold and silver as they could carry. They sought refuge in a Templar castle at Gastria before embarking on ships sent by Prince Bohemond IV of Antioch, which took them to the Kingdom of Jerusalem, then ruled by Walter's cousin John of Brienne.

Burgundia would have been displaced as heir presumptive by the birth of her niece Maria in 1214 or 1215. The date of Burgundia's death is not known.
