= Hugh VIII of Lusignan =

French noble

- Lord of Luisignan
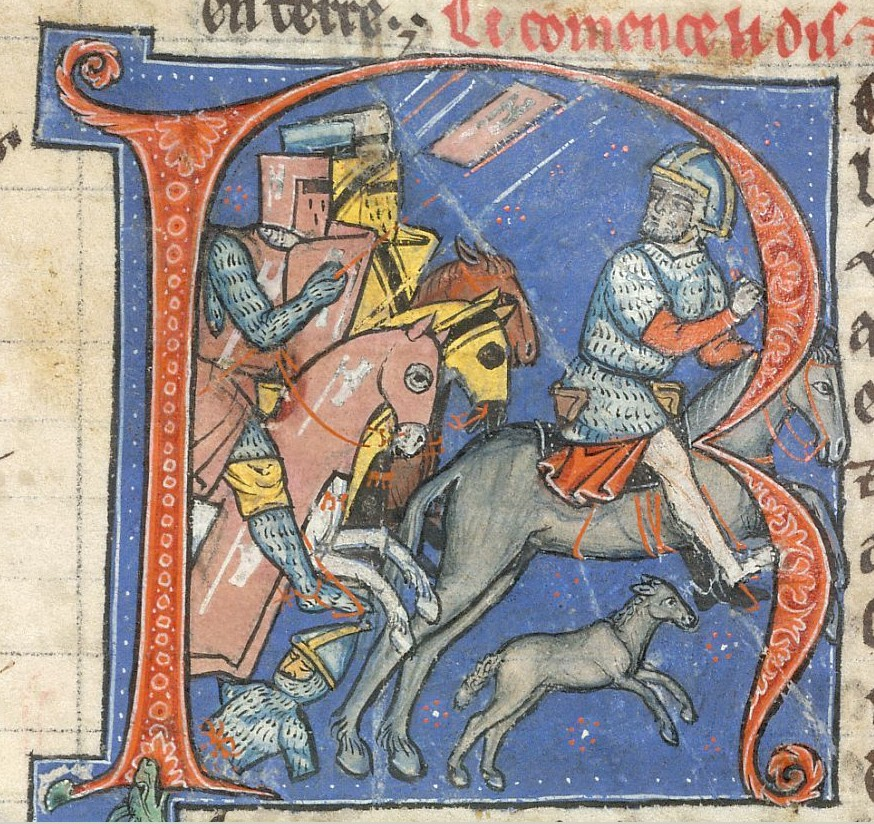
- Mail-coated Nur al-Din Zengi, with bare legs and an open helmet, fleeing on horseback from two knights (Geoffrey Martel and Hugh de Lusignan the elder) pursuing him on war horses, at the Battle of Harim. "Histoire d'Outremer" (1232-1261) - BL Yates Thompson MS 12
- Born: 1106–1110 or after 1125; Poitou, France
- Died: 1165 or 1171; Holy Land
- Noble family: Lusignan
- Spouse: Burgundia of Rancon
- Issue Detail: Hugh Brunus; Geoffrey of Lusignan; Aimery, King of Cyprus; Guy, King of Jerusalem
- Father: Hugh VII
- Mother: Sarracena of Lezay

Hugh VIII the Old of Lusignan or (French: Hugues le Vieux) was the lord of Lusignan, Couhé, and Château-Larcher on his father's death in 1151. He went on a crusade, was captured at battle of Harim, and died in captivity.

== Biography ==
Born in Poitou, Hugh was the eldest son of Hugh VII and of Sarracena of Lezay. He married Burgundia of Rancon, lady of Fontenay, daughter of Geoffrey of Rancon, lord of Taillebourg, and wife Fossefie (Falsifie), lady of Moncontour, by whom Hugh also became lord of Fontenay: she died on 11 April 1169. He renounced the land of Jouarenne, stating by charter that it was the property of the abbey of Nouaille.

In 1163, Hugh went on crusade to the Holy Land, leaving his lands to his eldest son, Hugh Brunus, and participated in the Battle of Harim, where he was taken prisoner. He died in captivity.

== Children ==
Hugh and Burgundia had:

- Hugh Brunus (c. 1141–1169), married before 1162 Orengarde N, who died in 1169, leaving two sons at the time of his death
  - Hugh IX of Lusignan
  - Raoul I de Lusignan, Count of Eu
- Robert de Lusignan, died young c. 1150
- Geoffrey of Lusignan (bef. 1150 – May 1216), Seigneur of Moncontour and Seigneur de Soubise, Seigneur de Vouvent, de Mervent by first marriage, Count of Jaffa and Ascalon on 28 July 1191 (he relinquished these titles upon his return from the Holy Land in 1193), who fought in the Siege of Acre. Married firstly Humberge de Limoges, daughter of Aimar V of Limoges and wife Sarra de Cornouailles, with whom he had a son named Hugo, and who probably died young. He married Eustache de Chabot, Dame de Vouvent et Dame de Mervent (d. after 1200).
- Peter de Lusignan (bef. 1155 – aft. December 1174), witnessed a charter in Antioch in 1174, but is otherwise not documented. He died probably as a priest.
- Guy of Lusignan, born about 1150, died 1194. He was regent and afterwards King of Jerusalem. After the loss of Jerusalem he became Lord of Cyprus.
- Aimery of Lusignan, born about 1153, died 1205. He succeeded his older brother Guy as ruler of Cyprus; later he was crowned King of Cyprus, the first of the Lusignan dynasty, and also eventually became King of Jerusalem.
- William de Lusignan or de Valence, born after 1163, betrothed to Beatrix de Courtenay, daughter of Joscelin III of Edessa, in 1186. The marriage does not seem to have taken place. He died before 1208.

== Sources ==
- Handyside, Philip (2015). The Old French William of Tyre. Brill.
- Painter, Sidney (1955). "The Houses of Lusignan and Chatellerault 1150-1250". Speculum. 30 (3 July). The University of Chicago Press: 374–384. doi:10.2307/2848076. JSTOR 2848076. S2CID 162997835.
- Painter, Sidney (1957). "The Lords of Lusignan in the Eleventh and Twelfth Centuries". Speculum. 32, No. 1, (Jan.) (1). The University of Chicago Press: 27–47. doi:10.2307/2849244. JSTOR 2849244. S2CID 161153870.
