= Guy of Lusignan =

King of Jerusalem from 1186 to 1192

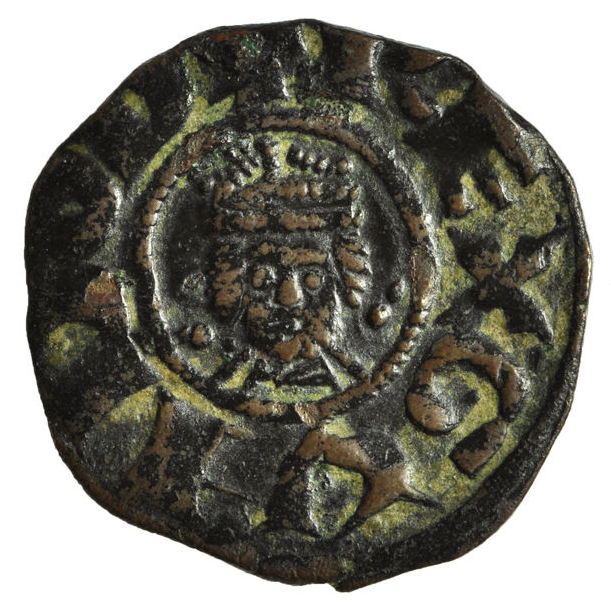
- Coin of Guy as Lord of Cyprus

King of Jerusalem
- Reign: 1186–1192
- Predecessor: Baldwin V
- Successors: Isabella I and Conrad
- Co-ruler: Sibylla (1186–1190)
- Contenders: Isabella I and Conrad (1190–1192)

Lord of Cyprus
- Reign: 1192–1194
- Successor: Aimery
- Born: c. 1150; Lusignan, Poitou
- Died: 1194 (aged 43–44); Nicosia, Kingdom of Cyprus
- Spouse: Sibylla of Jerusalem (m. 1180; died 1190)
- Issue: 4 daughters
- House: House of Lusignan
- Father: Hugh VIII of Lusignan
- Mother: Burgundia of Rancon
- Religion: Roman Catholicism

Guy of Lusignan (c. 1150 – 1194) was king of Jerusalem, first as the husband and co-ruler of Queen Sibylla from 1186 to 1190, then as disputed ruler from 1190 to 1192. He was also lord of Cyprus from 1192 to 1194. As king, Guy was highly unpopular amongst the nobles of the Kingdom of Jerusalem, and is often blamed for the fall of the kingdom to Saladin.

Guy, a Frankish Poitevin knight, was the youngest son of Hugh VIII of Lusignan. After killing Patrick, 1st Earl of Salisbury, in a failed attempt to kidnap Eleanor of Aquitaine, he was banished from Poitou. After arriving in the Holy Land at an unknown date from 1173 to 1180, Guy was hastily married to Sibylla, the sister of Baldwin IV of Jerusalem, in 1180 to prevent a political coup. As Baldwin's health deteriorated due to his leprosy, he appointed Guy as regent in 1183. However, Guy proved to be unpopular and incompetent as a leader, and Baldwin IV resumed power later that year. He stripped Guy of his inheritance, naming Baldwin V, Sibylla's son by her first husband, as his co-king and eventual successor instead. Baldwin IV died in 1185, followed shortly by the sickly Baldwin V in 1186, leading to the succession of Sibylla. Sibylla was told to annul her marriage to Guy in order to ascend to the throne on the condition that she would be allowed to pick her next husband, but astonished the court by choosing to remarry and crown Guy. Guy's reign was marked by increased hostilities with the Ayyubid Sultanate of Egypt, ruled by Saladin, culminating in the Battle of Hattin in July 1187—during which Guy was captured—and the fall of Jerusalem itself three months later.

Following a year of imprisonment in Damascus, Guy was released by Saladin and reunited with his wife. After Conrad of Montferrat denied him entry to Tyre, one of the last crusader strongholds, Guy besieged Acre in 1189. The siege, during which Guy's wife and children died during an epidemic, developed into a rallying point for the Third Crusade, led by Philip II of France and Richard I of England. Conrad married Sibylla's half-sister Isabella and entered a bitter conflict with Guy over the kingship of Jerusalem. Despite Richard's support for the widower king, the kingdom's nobility elected Conrad king in 1192, and Richard compensated Guy for the dispossession of his crown by giving him lordship of Cyprus. The Assassins killed Conrad days after his election; Guy ruled the Kingdom of Cyprus until he died in 1194 when he was succeeded by his elder brother Aimery.

== Early life ==
Born c. 1150, (Note: Guy's exact year of birth is not known, but his elder brother, Aimery, was born before 1155. Since Guy was presumably of age when he attempted to capture Eleanor of Aquitaine in 1168, he was thus born in the 1150s.) Guy was a member of the House of Lusignan, the youngest son of Hugh VIII of Lusignan and his wife, Burgundia of Rancon. The family's land holdings were in Poitou, which was a part of King Henry II of England's territories within the Kingdom of France. Both the Lusignans and the Rancons had a long history of involvement in the Crusades, starting with the participation of Guy's great-grandfather Hugh VI of Lusignan at the Battle of Ramla in 1102. Guy's grandfather, Hugh VII of Lusignan, and maternal uncle, Geoffrey the Poitevin, both took part in the Second Crusade. Guy's father also came to Jerusalem on a crusade, dying in Muslim captivity in the 1160s after the Battle of Harim.

On 27 March 1168, Guy and his brothers ambushed and killed Patrick, 1st Earl of Salisbury and governor of Poitou, who was escorting Eleanor of Aquitaine to Poitiers. They captured Patrick's nephew William the Marshal, then a knight-errant serving in his uncle's household, and allowed Eleanor to pay for his freedom. The brothers were subsequently banished from Poitou.

Guy went to Jerusalem at some date between 1173 and 1180, initially either as a pilgrim or Crusader. He also may have arrived with the French Crusaders of 1179. In 1174, his older brother Aimery married Eschiva, daughter of the powerful nobleman Baldwin of Ibelin, and entered court circles. Aimery also obtained the support of King Baldwin IV and of his mother Agnes of Courtenay, and he was appointed Agnes's Constable in Jaffa and later Constable of the Kingdom. Aimery's success likely facilitated Guy's social and political advancement whenever he arrived. However, as King Baldwin had leprosy, he was not expected to live much longer, making the kingdom's succession uncertain.

== Marriage and countship ==
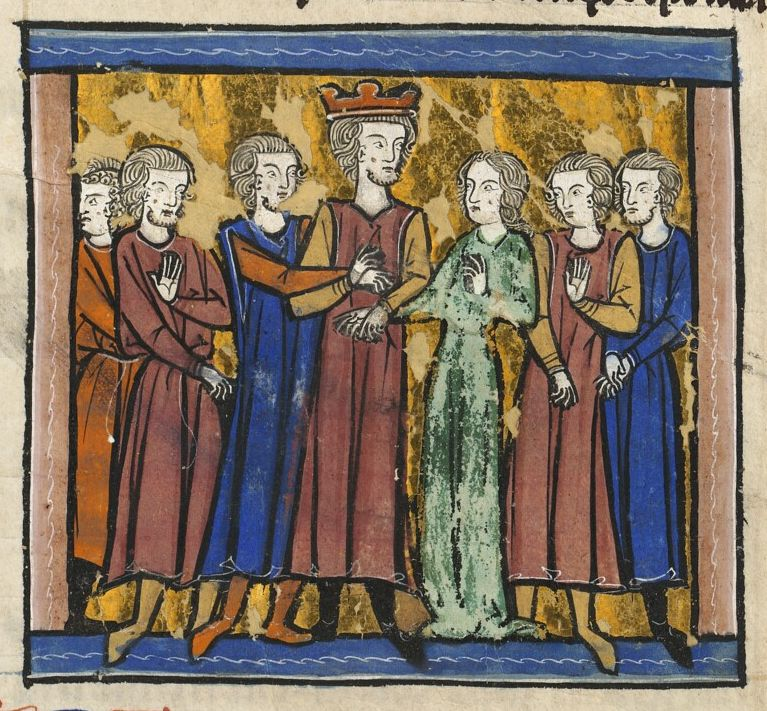
Marriage of Sibylla and Guy

During the Holy Week in 1180, Raymond III of Tripoli and Bohemond III of Antioch, two of the most powerful men in the kingdom, were preparing to invade Jerusalem. Historian Bernard Hamilton believed they wished to force King Baldwin to have his sister, Sibylla, marry Baldwin of Ibelin, Aimery of Lusignan's father-in-law, and then to abdicate. They would therefore remove the King's mother, Agnes, from power and promote a local noble to the throne instead of a foreigner. Guy and Sibylla were hastily married at Eastertide to prevent this coup. The ceremony was noticeably hurried; the wedding was canonically invalid and there was no public notice.

From 1180, Guy held Jaffa and Ascsalon alongside Sibylla and had four daughters with her. Their marriage split the nobles into two factions: One faction supporting Guy primarily composed of Sibylla's maternal kin, and one faction opposing him, composed primarily of Sibylla's paternal kin. To prevent the opposing party from setting up a rival claimant, King Baldwin took his mother's advice and, in October 1180, betrothed his half-sister Isabella, the stepdaughter of Baldwin of Ibelin's brother Balian, to Humphrey IV of Toron. From March 1181, both Guy and Sibylla were associated with Baldwin IV in public acts such as charters.

Baldwin IV's leprosy worsened quickly; by 1183, he had become blind and could no longer walk unsupported or use his hands. Having developed a deadly fever, Baldwin summoned the High Court to his bedside in June and made Guy regent. Since Guy was next in line to the throne and Baldwin was not expected to survive, this regency was supposed to be permanent. The King kept only his royal title and his authority over the city of Jerusalem, but he made Guy swear that he would not crown himself king or alienate parts of the royal demesne as long as Baldwin was alive.

=== Disinheritance ===
The powerful nobles of the Kingdom of Jerusalem, namely Raymond III of Tripoli, Bohemond III of Antioch, and the grand masters of the military orders, refused to cooperate with Guy. Not wanting to anger them, Baldwin failed to give Guy any training in military leadership before making him regent. Baldwin unexpectedly recovered from his sickness and, now believing Guy to be incompetent and foolish, returned to Jerusalem to resume power. Finding that the coastal climate was better for his health, Baldwin offered Jerusalem to Guy in exchange for Tyre. Guy refused, likely because Tyre was more wealthy, leaving Baldwin deeply offended.

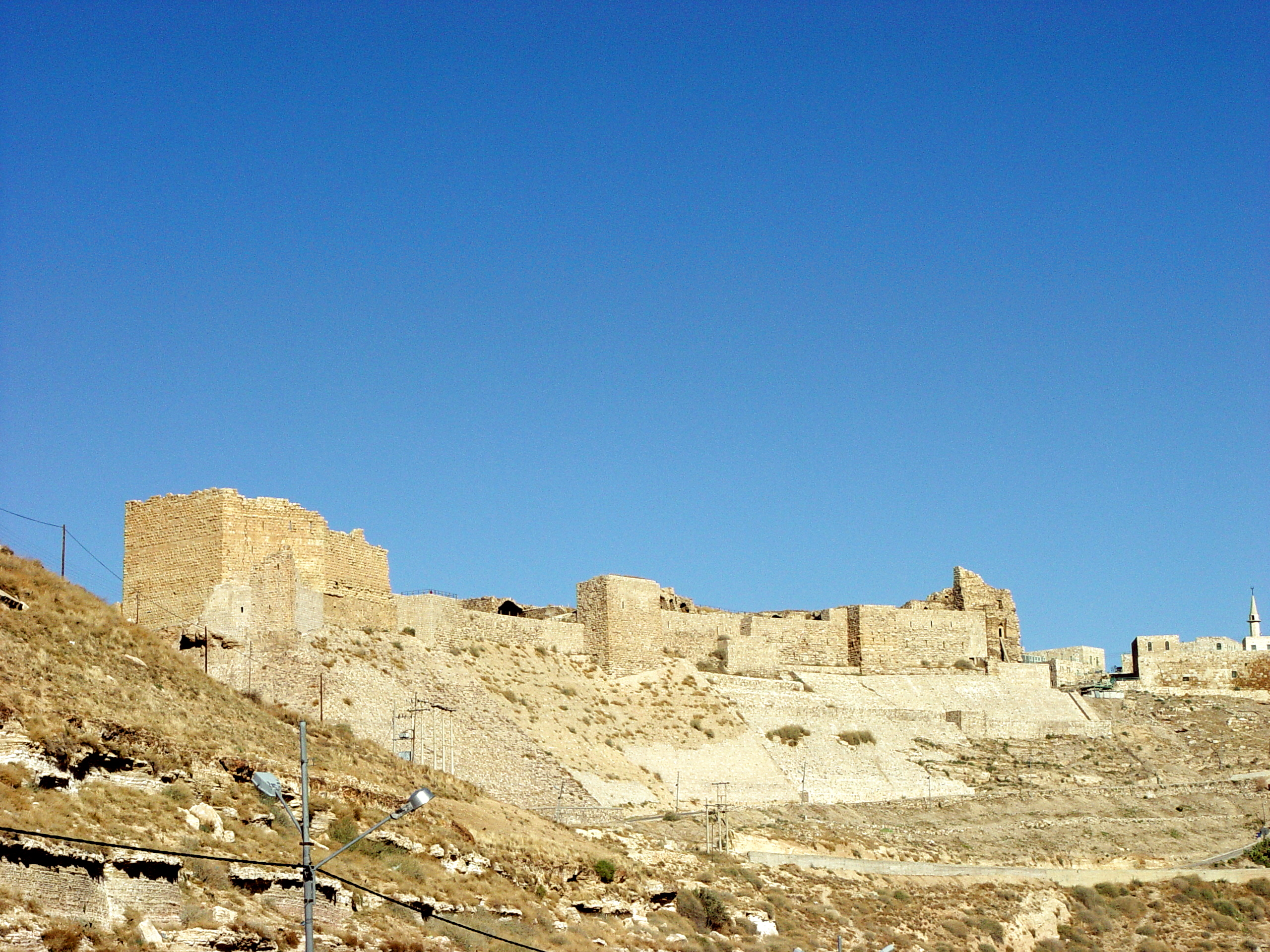
Kerak Castle

The wedding of Sibylla's half-sister, Isabella, and Humphrey IV of Toron was celebrated in Kerak in late 1183. Saladin attacked during the ceremony and laid siege to the castle, hoping to capture the newlyweds. The defence of the castle and the King's half-sister within it could not be entrusted to Guy, who was not able to effectively command the troops. Although Heraclius, along with the grand masters of the Templars and Hospitallers, tried to mediate in Guy's favor, it did not work; Raymond and Bohemond convinced the King to dismiss Guy from the regency. Since Guy's removal from power was essentially disinheritance, the nobles discussed the kingdom's succession. They accepted Agnes's proposal that Sibylla's five-year-old son from her first husband, Baldwin V, be crowned co-king. The coronation took place on 20 November, and the boy received the homage of all the barons except for Guy, who was not invited.

=== Conflicts ===
Despite his leprosy, Baldwin went with his troops to relieve the siege at Kerak. Although he was disgraced, Guy still led the men of Jaffa and Ascalon. After the battle, he went directly to Ascalon and asked Sibylla to join him there; the King wanted to annul Guy's marriage to her, which could not happen if the couple refused to show up in court. Guy and Sibylla refused to leave Ascalon despite the King's summons, foiling his plan to make them annul their marriage.

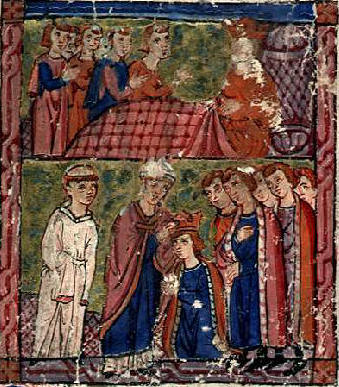
Death of Baldwin IV and coronation of Baldwin V in the 1280 edition of William of Tyre's Histoire d'Outremer

Early in 1184, Baldwin ordered Guy to attend him as a vassal in Jerusalem, but Guy refused to go, citing poor health. When Baldwin sent for Guy again, Guy insisted that the King should see him in person and deliver his command with his own voice. Baldwin had himself carried to Ascalon in the company of the High Court, where Guy refused to let him into the city. The King was then welcomed in Jaffa, where he installed a governor, thereby depriving Guy of half his county.

In late 1184, Guy massacred the Bedouin people of the royal fief of Darum, who were under royal protection and gave Baldwin information about the Egyptians' movements. However, these Bedouin in particular could have also been giving information to Saladin. The King was very distressed by this, but he quickly developed another fever, bestowing regency on Raymond of Tripoli. On his deathbed, the King summoned the High Court to appoint a permanent regent for his nephew, Baldwin V, and Raymond was chosen; Baldwin IV died in March 1185.

== Accession ==
Baldwin V died in 1186, only a year after his uncle. The High Court of Jerusalem ruled that neither Sibylla nor her half-sister, Isabella, could be crowned without the decision of the pope, the Holy Roman Emperor, and the kings of France and England. Joscelin of Courtenay, Sibylla's uncle and ally, convinced Raymond of Tripoli to go to Tiberias to prepare for a general assembly and let the Templars bring Baldwin's body to Jerusalem. Raymond and the nobles went to Nablus, the fief of Balian of Ibelin. According to the chroniclers Arnold of Lübeck and Ibn al-Athir, Raymond tried to become king at the assembly, but was not successful. Taking advantage of Raymond's absence, Joscelin then garrisoned Acre and Beirut.

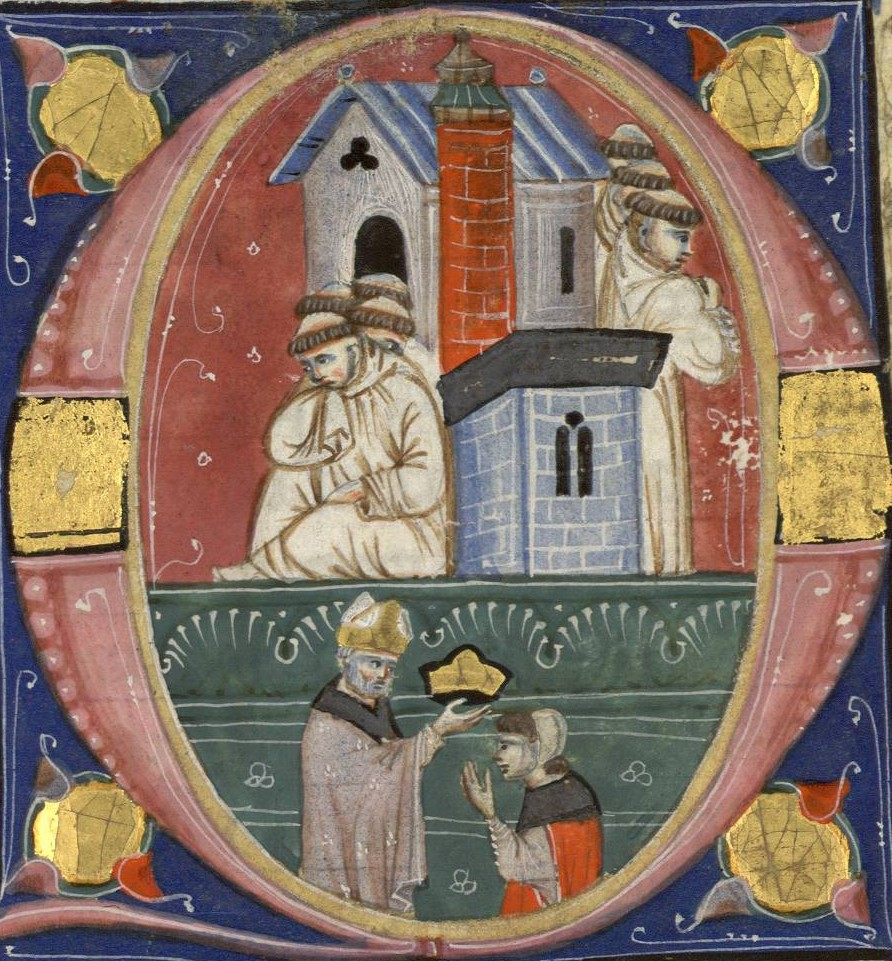
Sibylla crowned by Heraclius while monks sent from Nablus spy on them

Meanwhile, Guy and Sibylla hurried to Jerusalem to attend her son's funeral. Heraclius, the patriarch of Jerusalem, the grand masters of the Templars and Hospitallers, and Raynald of Châtillon were also present. They decided to offer Sibylla the crown without waiting for the decision of the western monarchs. Sibylla announced that the kingdom had passed to her by hereditary right, but the nobles at Nablus did not acknowledge her queenship, claiming that crowning Sibylla would breach their oaths taken at Baldwin IV's deathbed. They forbade the coronation and sent two abbots to Jerusalem to tell her of their veto. The city gates were consequently barred before the ceremony to prevent interruption by Raymond's men. Sibylla was then acclaimed queen by the citizens of Jerusalem at Raynald's request.

However, before she was crowned, Sibylla agreed with oppositional court members that she would annul her marriage with Guy to please them, as long as she was given free choice in her next husband and her children with Guy were declared legitimate. The leaders of the High Court agreed, and Sibylla was crowned queen regnant. After crowning her, the patriarch gave Sibylla a second crown and asked her to choose a new husband. She shocked the attendees by choosing to remarry Guy, who was unpopular even among her supporters, and crowning him. However, there is no mention of Sibylla and Guy being anointed, which was expected at the time.

Guy's opponents wished to make Humphrey IV of Toron, Raynald's stepson, claim the crown on his wife Isabella's behalf; they believed Sibylla's legitimacy to be dubious since her parents' marriage was annulled and emphasized that Isabella was born after her father was crowned. However, Humphrey did not want to become king. He left Nablus at night and rode to Jerusalem to swear fealty to Guy. Sibylla initially turned him down, but after Humphrey explained his intentions, she led him to the King. Humphrey swore fealty to Guy, and most of the nobles followed shortly after, swearing fealty before 1187. However, Raymond of Tripoli returned to Tiberias without paying homage to Guy and Sibylla.

== Fall of Jerusalem ==
=== Raymond and Saladin ===
Guy accused Raymond of betrayal and invaded Galilee in October 1186. He ordered an assessment of Raymond's regency; Raymond replied that he spent all of his royal income on his administration. The count, with assistance from Saladin, decided to resist Guy. The Sultan's troops went to Tiberias, forcing Guy's army to withdraw. Arnold of Lübeck wrote that Raymond promised to let Saladin's army invade the kingdom across Galilee in exchange for the Sultan's assistance in seizing the throne. According to Ibn al-Athir, Saladin offered to make Raymond "an independent king for the Franks one and all".

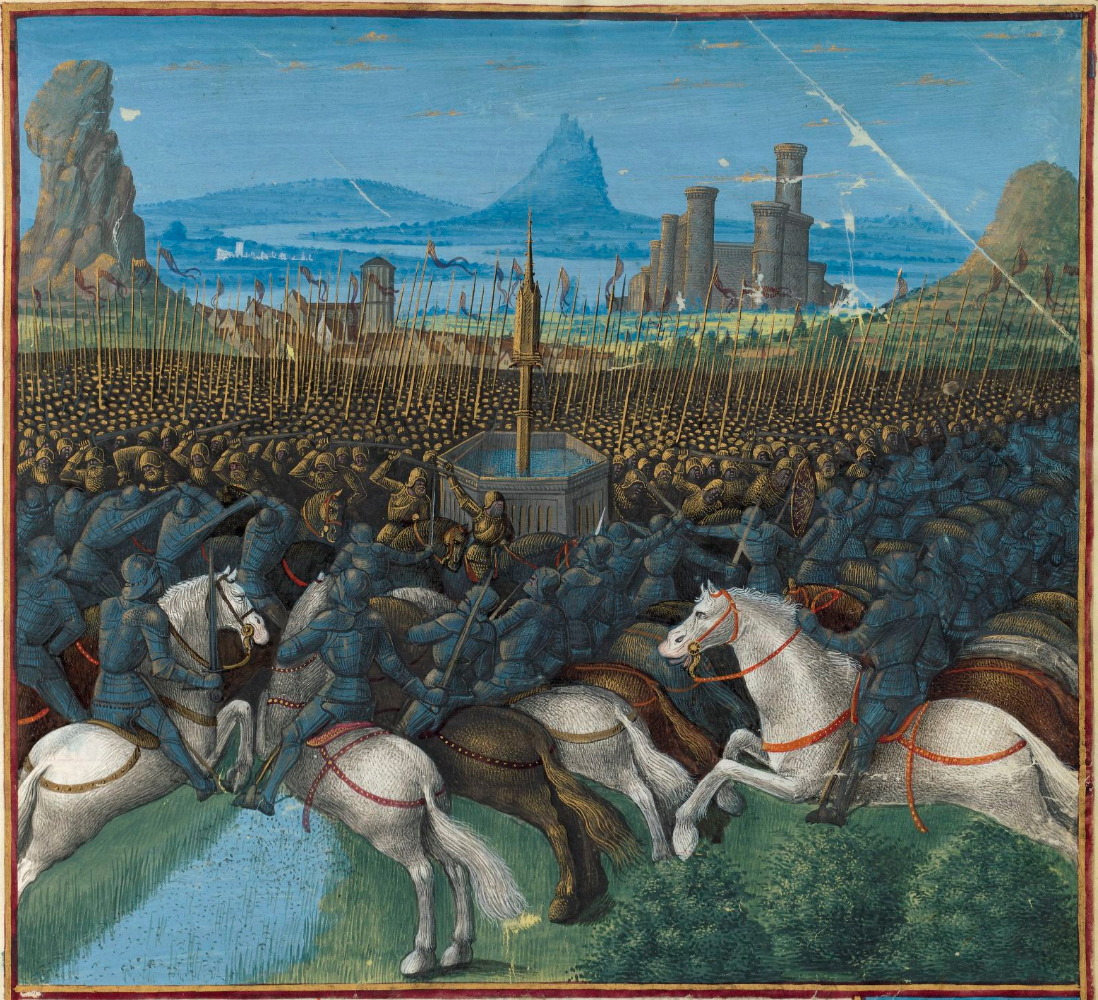
The Battle of Cresson, miniature by Jean Colombe, in Passages d'outremer c. 1474

Saladin started mustering forces from his entire kingdom in early 1187, preparing to launch a full-scale attack against the Kingdom of Jerusalem. The nobles asked Guy to seek reconciliation with Raymond; Archbishop Joscius of Tyre, Reginald of Sidon, Balian of Ibelin, and the masters of the two military orders, Gerard of Ridefort and Roger de Moulins, were appointed to begin negotiations with him in Tiberias. When Saladin's son, al-Afdal, sent Muzaffar al-Din, lord of Harenc and Edessa, to attack the kingdom, Raymond gave the Syrian troops free entry into Galilee thanks to his treaty with Saladin. After al-Afdal began attacking Nazareth, the masters of the military orders attacked the invaders despite being seriously outnumbered. The raiders killed nearly every crusader at the Battle of Cresson on 1 May; only Ridefort and a handful of knights survived. The Muslims returned to Syria across Galilee, displaying the heads of crusaders killed in battle on the points of their lances.

Balian of Ibelin arrived at Tiberias the following day. Ernoul, Balian of Ibelin's squire, wrote that Raymond agreed to pay homage to Guy after the news of the crusaders' crushing defeat astonished him. According to Ibn al-Athir, however, Raymond only agreed after his vassals threatened him with insubordination and the prelates threatened to excommunicate him and annul his marriage to Eschiva of Bures, stripping him of Galilee. Raymond forced the Muslim garrison, which was in Tiberias since his alliance with Saladin, out of the kingdom. Guy then met Raymond near Jerusalem at Fort St Job. Raymond knelt to Guy in homage, and according to Ernoul, Guy lifted him up and apologized to him for the strange circumstances of his coronation.

=== Hattin ===
Guy ordered the assembly of the Christian troops at Sepphoris. Raymond joined the royal troops with the knights from Galilee and Tripoli, leaving his wife in Tiberias with a small garrison. On 2 July 1187, Saladin invaded Galilee and besieged Tiberias; this sparked conflict among the crusaders since Raymond and Gerard of Ridefort created opposite strategies. Stating that the town could resist this siege, Raymond did not want a battle with Saladin and suggested that Guy send envoys to Antioch asking Bohemond III for reinforcements. However, Gerard and Raynald of Châtillon accused him of cowardice, saying that inactivity would cost the crusaders Jerusalem. Guy was more inclined to accept Raymond's suggestion, but Raynald reminded him of Raymond's alliance with Saladin. Guy then decided to fight against the Sultan and ordered his army to march towards Tiberias.

After Saladin's troops launched an attack against the rear held by the Templars, the crusaders halted at Maskana, but the local well could not provide enough water for a large army. The anonymous author of the chronicle Libellus de expugnatione Terrae Sanctae per Saladinum, who participated in the campaign, wrote that Guy decided to stop there against Raymond's advice. Saladin's troops encircled the crusaders' camp and killed all crusaders who left it in search of water. The crusader army then continued marching towards Tiberias the following day, with Raymond commanding the vanguard and Saladin's troops attacking them. After Raymond forced the Muslim troops to open a pass, he and the crusaders who had accompanied him (including Reginald of Sidon, Balian of Ibelin, and Joscelin III of Edessa) escaped to Safed and then to Tyre.

The rest of the crusaders were annihilated, and Saladin captured almost all of the towns of the kingdom over the following month. Eschiva of Bures surrendered Tiberias to Saladin and joined her husband in Tyre. Most commanders of the Christian army were captured on the battlefield, including Guy and Raynald.

=== Capture ===
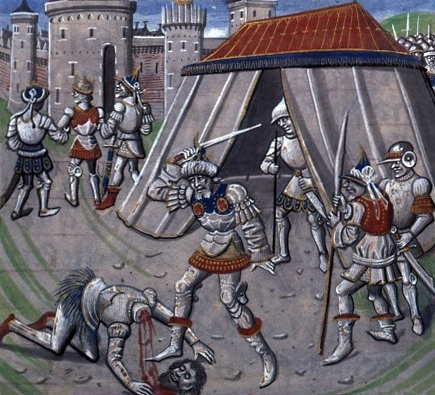
Execution of Raynald at Hattin (from a 15th-century manuscript of William of Tyre's Historia and its Continuation)

The exhausted captives were brought to Saladin's tent, where Guy was given a goblet of iced rose water as a sign of Saladin's generosity, for offering a prisoner food or beverage meant that he would not be killed. Imad ad-Din al-Isfahani recorded that Raynald drank from the cup after Guy offered him the goblet, and Saladin pointed out that it was Guy who had offered the goblet to Raynald, not him. According to Ernoul, however, Raynald refused to drink from the cup that Guy handed to him.

After calling Raynald to his tent, Saladin accused him of various crimes, including brigandage and blasphemy. According to Imad ad-Din and Ibn al-Athir, Saladin offered Raynald the choice between conversion to Islam or death, and Raynald flatly refused to convert; Saladin consequently struck and beheaded him on the spot. Baha ad-Din wrote that Raynald's fate astonished and terrified Guy, but Saladin comforted him, stating "A king does not kill a king, but that man's perfidy and insolence went too far".

In the months after Hattin, all of the kingdom fell to Saladin except Tyre. Additionally, Raymond III of Tripoli died in September of that year. Sibylla went to Ascalon and surrendered the city to Saladin in exchange for Guy's release, but the Sultan kept him imprisoned. However, none of these requests for aid were written in Sibylla's name. Guy was only set free in 1188, and he and Sibylla reunited on the island of Arwad near Tortosa. The couple then went to Antioch and later to Tripoli, gathering troops as they travelled.

== Guy and Conrad ==
=== Siege of Acre ===
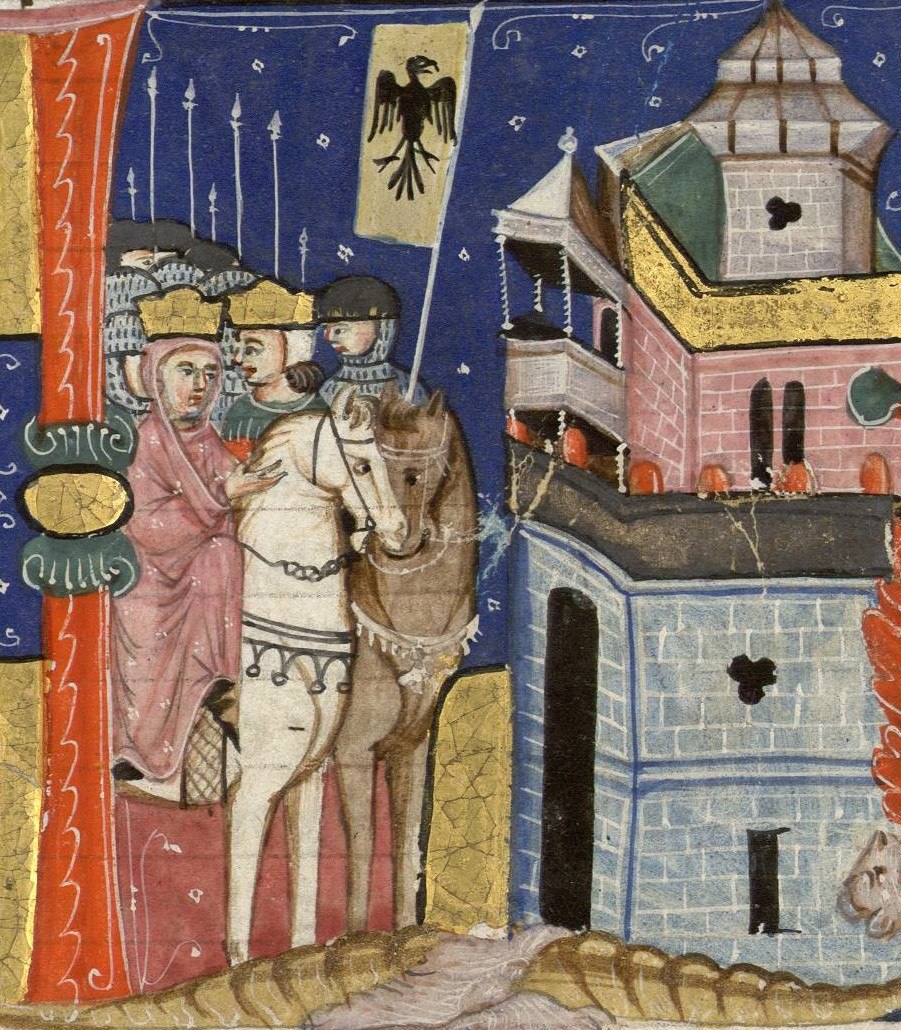
Guy and Sibylla outside of Tyre

Tyre's defender, Conrad of Montferrat, the brother of Sibylla's first husband William, denied sanctuary to Guy and Sibylla, who camped outside the city walls for months. Guy then took the initiative, beginning the siege of Acre in anticipation of the arrival of the vanguard of the Third Crusade, but James of Avesnes, Louis III of Thuringia and various other crusaders who came to Jerusalem questioned his claim to the throne. An epidemic struck the crusaders' camp in 1190, and Queen Sibylla died on 25 July; her daughters also died just a few days later. As soon as Sibylla was dead, Conrad challenged Guy for the throne. Conrad decided to marry Sibylla's half-sister Isabella. Conrad and Isabella then returned to Tyre. Guy, however, still wanted to be recognized as king.

After Philip II of France, who landed at Acre on 20 April 1191, supported Conrad's claim to Jerusalem, Guy, joined by Conrad's opponents (including Humphrey IV of Toron and Bohemond III of Antioch), needed assistance from Richard I of England, who chose to support Guy. Guy then took the title of "king-elect of Jerusalem" in May. In 1191, Guy left Acre with a small fleet and various nobles, including his brother, Geoffrey of Lusignan, Humphrey IV of Toron, and Bohemond III of Antioch. He landed in Cyprus to seek support from Richard I of England, whose vassal he had been in Poitou. When Richard arrived at Acre on 8 June 1191, he supported Guy against Conrad, who had the support of his kinsmen Philip II and Leopold V of Austria.

The eastern Mediterranean in 1190.

The crusaders captured Acre on 11 July 1191. A temporary settlement was then reached, by which Guy was to remain king for the rest of his life, but Conrad would rule Tyre, Beirut and Sidon; Guy would then be succeeded by Conrad and Isabella or their heirs, who would unite the kingdom. Three days later, Philip returned to France and Richard became the primary commander of the crusaders. The nobles of the kingdom remained extremely hostile to Guy, with many supporting Conrad instead.

On 16 April 1192, King Richard held an assembly. The prelates and noblemen there unanimously voted for Conrad to become king. Richard accepted their choice, but feeling a sense of loyalty to Guy, he granted Cyprus to him, which he took during the third crusade. Richard sent his nephew, Count Henry II of Champagne, to tell Conrad about the assembly. Henry arrived at Tyre about four days later, and it was decided that Isabella and Conrad would be crowned at Acre. On 28 April 1192, the Order of Assassins murdered Conrad. Two days after Conrad's death, his widow's betrothal to Henry was announced, and the marriage was celebrated on 10 May 1192 in Acre.

=== Lord of Cyprus and death ===
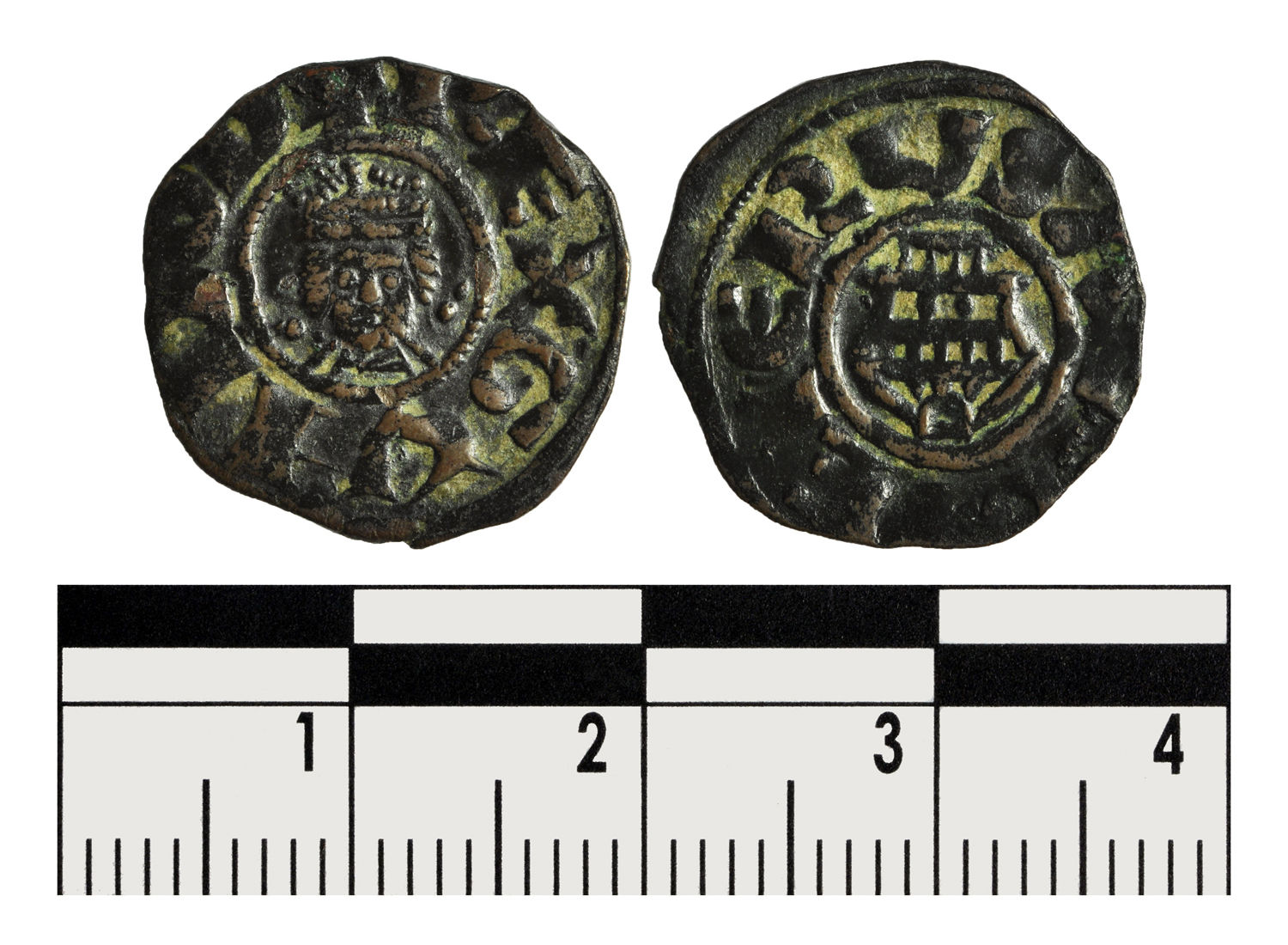
The coin reads REX GVIDO D on the inverse. On the reverse, EIERVSALEM is inscribed around the Holy Sepulchre.

After the agreement, Guy settled in Cyprus by early May 1192. Contrary to his career in Jerusalem, he proved to be a competent ruler in Cyprus, which he ruled until his death in 1194. According to Ernoul, by the end of Guy's reign, the treasury of Cyprus was emptied; Guy had granted most landed property on the island to his supporters.

Guy died around the end of 1194; the latest surviving document mentioning him as alive is a charter from 18 August. Since he had no surviving issue, Guy bequeathed Cyprus to his brother Geoffrey. Geoffrey had already returned to Poitou, and Guy's vassals elected his brother Aimery as their new lord instead.

== In popular culture ==
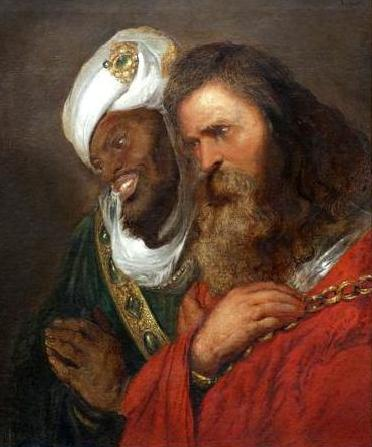
Saladin (left) and Guy of Lusignan (right), painting by Jan Lievens

Guy appears as the main leading character in a tale of Decameron by Giovanni Boccaccio, where the censure of a Gascon lady rouses the King of Cyprus from lethargy to take responsibility for his realm.

In the 2005 movie Kingdom of Heaven, Guy is portrayed as an arrogant, scheming villain (and a Templar) played by Marton Csokas.

== Sources ==
- Asbridge, Thomas (2015). The Greatest Knight: The Remarkable Life of William Marshal, Power Behind Five English Thrones. London: Simon & Schuster.
- Baldwin, Marshall W. (1969) [1955]. "The Latin States under Baldwin III and Amalric I, 1143–1174; The Decline and Fall of Jerusalem, 1174–1189". In Baldwin, Marshall W. (ed.). The First Hundred Years. A History of the Crusades. Vol. I. The University of Wisconsin Press. pp. 528–561, 590–621. ISBN 9780299048341.
- Barber, Malcolm (2012). The Crusader States. Yale University Press. ISBN 978-0-300-11312-9.
- Bennett, Stephen (2021). Elite Participation in the Third Crusade. The Boydell Press.
- Edbury, Peter W. (1994). The Kingdom of Cyprus and the Crusades, 1191-1374. Cambridge University Press.
- Furber, Elizabeth Chapin (1969). "The Kingdom of Cyprus, 1191–1291". In Setton, Kenneth M.; Wolff, Robert Lee; Hazard, Harry (eds.). A History of the Crusades, Volume II: The Later Crusades, 1189–1311. The University of Wisconsin Press. pp. 599–629. ISBN 0-299-04844-6.
- Hamilton, Bernard (1978). "Women in the Crusader States: The Queens of Jerusalem". In Baker, Derek (ed.). Medieval Women. Ecclesiastical History Society. ISBN 9780631192602.
- Hamilton, Bernard (2000). The Leper King and his Heirs: Baldwin IV and the Crusader Kingdom of Jerusalem. Cambridge University Press. ISBN 9780521641876.
- Lambert, Sarah (1997). "Queen or Consort: Rulership and Politics in the Latin East, 1118–1228". In Duggan, Anne J. (ed.). Queens and Queenship in Medieval Europe: Proceedings of a Conference Held at King's College London, April 1995. Boydell Press. pp. 153–169. ISBN 0-85115-657-6.
- Lewis, Kevin James (2017). The Counts of Tripoli and Lebanon in the Twelfth Century: Sons of Saint-Gilles. Routledge. ISBN 9781472458902.
- Lock, Peter (2006). The Routledge Companion to the Crusades. Routledge. ISBN 9-78-0-415-39312-6.
- Nicholson, Helen J. (2004). "La Roine Preude Femme Et Bonne Dame': Queen Sybil of Jerusalem (1186–1190) in History and Legend, 1186–1300.". In Morillo, Stephen; Korngiebel, Diane (eds.). The Haskins Society Journal: Studies in Medieval History. Vol. 15. Boydell Press. ISBN 1843831988. JSTOR 10.7722/j.ctt7zssjh.
- Nicholson, Helen J. (2022). Sybil, Queen of Jerusalem, 1186–1190. Routledge. ISBN 978-1-138-63651-4., doi:10.4324/9781315205960
- Painter, Sidney (1957). "The Lords of Lusignan in the Eleventh and Twelfth Centuries". Speculum. 32 (1). The University of Chicago Press: 27–47. doi:10.2307/2849244. ISSN 0038-7134. JSTOR 2849244. S2CID 161153870.
- Painter, Sidney (1969). "The Third Crusade: Richard the Lionhearted and Philip Augustus". In Setton, Kenneth M.; Wolff, Robert Lee; Hazard, Harry (eds.). A History of the Crusades, Volume II: The Later Crusades, 1189–1311. The University of Wisconsin Press. pp. 45–85. ISBN 0-299-04844-6.
- Riley-Smith, Jonathan (1973). The feudal nobility and the kingdom of Jerusalem, 1147 - 1277. Macmillan.
- Royal Archaeological Institute (1851). Memoirs Illustrative of the History and Antiquities of Wiltshire and the City of Salisbury. pp. 216–17.
- Runciman, Steven (1989a). A History of the Crusades, Volume II: The Kingdom of Jerusalem and the Frankish East, 1100-1187. Cambridge University Press. ISBN 0-521-06163-6.
- Runciman, Steven (1989b). A History of the Crusades, Volume III: The Kingdom of Acre and the Later Crusades. Cambridge University Press. ISBN 0-521-06163-6.

Regnal titles
Preceded by Baldwin V	King of Jerusalem; 1186–1192 (with Sibylla, 1186–1190)	Succeeded by Isabella I and Conrad
Preceded by New creation	Lord of Cyprus; 1192–1194	Succeeded by Aimery
