= Geoffrey of Lusignan =

Count of Jaffa and Ascalon

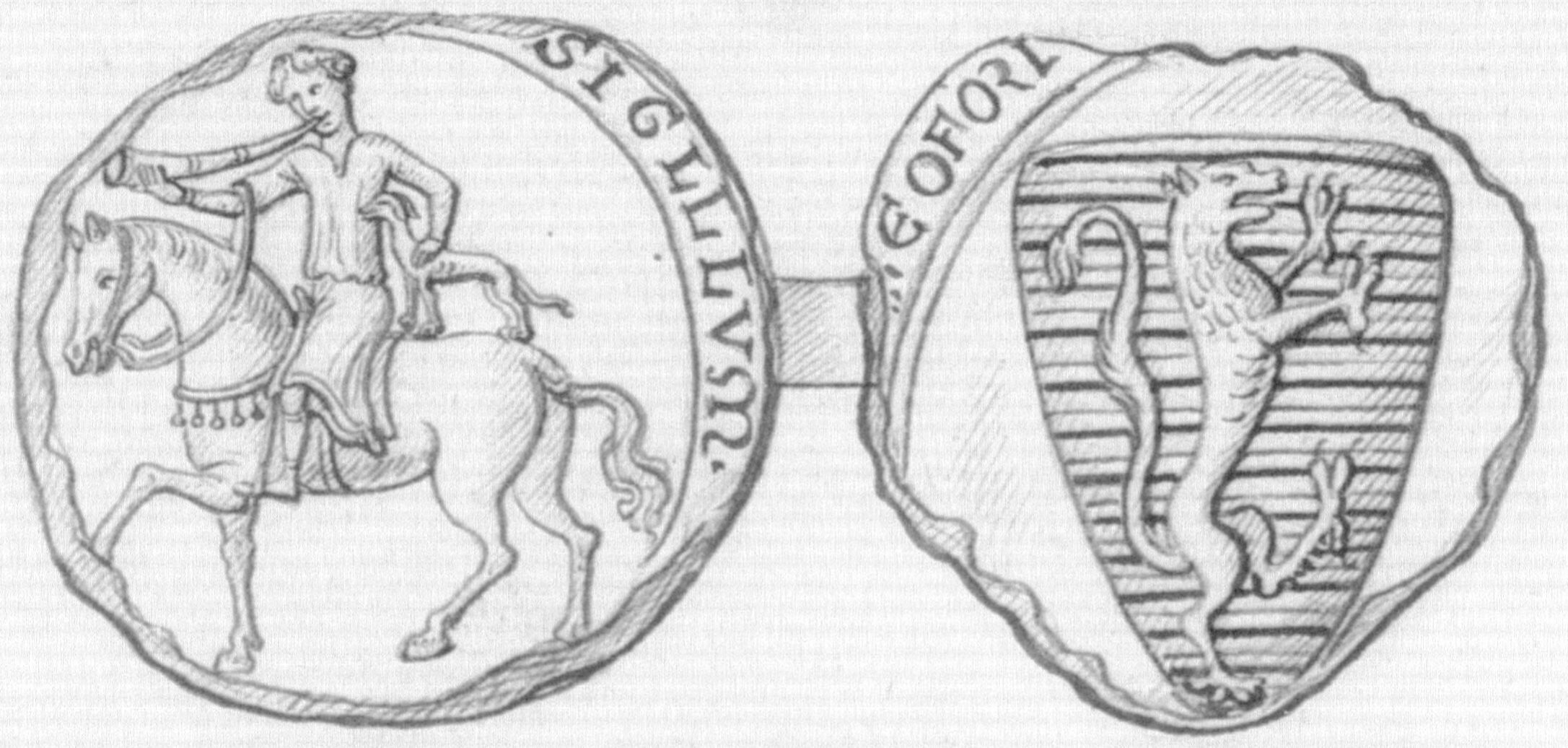
Geoffrey of Lusignan's seal

Coat of arms of Geoffrey of Lusignan

Geoffrey of Lusignan (before 1150 – May 1216) was the Lord of Vouvant and Soubise, and Count of Jaffa and Ascalon. He was also Lord of Mervent and Moncontour by his wife's rights.

== Early life ==
Geoffrey belonged to the House of Lusignan. His father was Hugh VIII of Lusignan and his mother was Bourgogne de Rancon, Lady of Vouvant and Civray. He was the elder brother of Aimery of Cyprus and Guy of Lusignan.

Like all members of his family, Geoffrey was an enemy of the House of Plantagenet. This enmity resulted from the Lusignan claim to the County of La Marche, which was held by the Norman Montgommery family with the recognition of the Plantagenets.

In 1168, the Lusignans revolted against King Henry II of England and killed his confidant Patrick, 1st Earl of Salisbury. In 1173, Geoffrey supported Duke Richard I of Aquitaine in the revolt against his father. When Count Aldebert IV sold the County of La Marche directly to King Henry II in 1177, it was Geoffrey, the head of the family, who once again took up arms to fight for the rights of the Lusignans. In 1183, he allied himself with Henry the Young King, Viscount Aimar V of Limoges and his cousin Gottfried II of Rancon against Duke Richard. However, the struggle ended with the unexpected death of the young king in June 1183, after which Geoffrey had to submit to Duke Richard.

== Third Crusade ==
Geoffrey was obliged to take the Cross as penance for his rebellious behavior, after which he went to the Holy Land, which he reached in 1188. His brother, Guy of Lusignan, had meanwhile risen to become King of Jerusalem, an almost unheard-of career leap which, according to the Chronicle of Ernoul, Geoffrey mockingly commented: "Next, he wants to become God!"

By the time Geoffrey arrived in the Holy Land, however, the Crusader kingdom had already been crushed by Sultan Saladin at the Battle of Hattin (1187) and King Guy was besieging Acre, in which Guy also took part and on October 4, 1189, stood out as the defender of the camp against an attack by Saladin. In June 1191, in front of Acre, Geoffrey publicly insulted and challenged Conrad of Montferrat during the general parliament meeting to settle the conflict between him and his brother Guy. After capturing the city, he was enfeoffed on 28 July 1191 with the county of Jaffa, then still occupied by Saladin and only reconquered in 1192 during the further course of the Third Crusade, ironically by Richard I, who was by then the Lusignans' most important ally in the Holy Land. He was a famous crusader associated with using the Dane axe during battles.

In 1193, Geoffrey resigned his titles and returned to Moncontour, his brother Aimery took over his estate.

== Return to France ==
Returning home, Geoffrey immediately resumed his hostility to the Plantagenets and supported King Philip II of France in the fight against King John. He moved in 1202 together with Prince Arthur of Brittany and his nephew Hugo IX against the castle of Mirebeau, on which the Duchess Eleanor of Aquitaine was seated. At dawn on July 31, 1202, the besiegers were surprised by a relief attack by King John, who wanted to save his mother. According to tradition, Geoffrey did not take the news of King John's approach very seriously because he underestimated his abilities as a knight; so he preferred to eat his breakfast. Together with his nephew and Prince Arthur, Geoffrey was taken prisoner by King John. Fortunately for Geoffrey, the king did not take advantage of this success and soon released the Lusignans in the hope of winning them over. But they immediately took up the fight against him again, especially after Prince Arthur was murdered in 1203.

In 1215, Geoffroy donated property to the Fontevraud Abbey for “the salvation of [his] soul”. The following year, his death was recorded in 1216 according to Bernard Itier's chronicle.

== Marriage and descendants ==
Geoffroy married twice.

In his first marriage, he was married to Humberge, a daughter of Viscount Aimar V of Limoges. They had one son:

- Hugh was only mentioned once in France in a donation to L'Absie Abbey in 1200. His position in the charter suggests he was much older than his brother Geoffrey. He is likely the same man referred to as Sir Hugh Le Brun (a marcher lord of Wales) said to be a son of Geoffroy Le Brun ( this man being the uncle of Hugh who was married to Isabel of Angoulême)

Geoffrey's second wife was Eustachie Chabot, whom he married before May 4, 1200. With her he had three sons:

- Geoffrey II, Lord of Vouvant, Mervent, Moncontour, Fontenay and Viscount of Châtellerault by marriage with Clémence de Châtellerault
- Guillaume married around 1226 Marquise de Mauléon, daughter of Savari de Mauléon, with whom he had:
  - Guillaume, killed along with his father in a battle at Mareuil-sur-Lay during a conflict with Peter I, Duke of Brittany
  - Valence, wife Hugues II Larchevêque, Lord of Parthenay
  - Aeline, married Barthélemy de la Haye
- Aimery, taken prisoner at a battle at Mareuil-sur-Lay in 1230 with his older brother Geoffroy II, then released shortly afterwards. He married Olive, daughter of Aalais of Piougier

== Bibliography ==
- Bernard Itier (1998). Chronicle. Paris: Les Belles Lettres.
- Geoffroy du Breuil (1867). Ex Chronico Gaufredi Cœnobitæ. In: Recueil des Historien des Gaules et de la France (in French).
- Josef ben Josua ha-Kohen (1835). The Chronicles of Rabbi Joseph Ben Joshua Ben Meir the Sphardi.
- Keightley, Thomas (1852). The Crusaders or Scenes, Events And Characters from the Times of the Crusades. John W. Parker and Son.
- Nicholson, Helen (2004). Medieval Warfare. Basingstoke: Palgrave MacMillan. ISBN 0-333-76331-9.
- Painter, Sidney (1955). "The Houses of Lusignan and Chatellerault 1150-1250". Speculum. 30 (3 July). The University of Chicago Press: 374–384. doi:10.2307/2848076. JSTOR 2848076. S2CID 162997835.
- Roger of Howden (1867). Gesta regis Henrici Secundi Benedicti Abbatis: the chronicle of the reigns of Henry II. and Richard I.; A. D. 1169-1192. London: Longmans, Green, Reader, and Dyer.
- Stubbs, William (1867). Gesta regis Henrici Secundi Benedicti Abbatis: the chronicle of the reigns of Henry II. and Richard I.; A. D. 1169-1192. London: Longmans, Green, Reader, and Dyer.

Titles of nobility
Preceded by Sibylla	Count of Jaffa and Ascalon; 1191–1193	Succeeded by Aimery
