= Boso III of La Marche =

Boso III (died 1091) was the count of La Marche from 1071 until his death. He belonged to the House of Charroux.

Boso succeeded his father Aldebert II, who resigned in 1071 to become a permanent councillor at the court of Duke William VIII of Aquitaine. Like his father, who continued to exercise influence over his son for several years, Boso was a loyal subject of the duke. He accompanied William on visits to Saintes in 1074, 1075 and 1081. Between 1080 and 1086, he sat on the duke's judicial court. According to Pierre Robert, his father died in 1088.

Following his father's death, Boso witnessed several charters issued by Duke William in favour of the abbey of Saint-Cyprien and the abbey of Montierneuf. His name also appears on many donations to the abbey of Le Dorat. The 14th-century chronicle of Étienne Maleu records how he was miraculously cured of a fever and afterwards intervened with Bishop Humbald of Limoges to have the bishop transfer land to the church of Saint-Junien.

Boso sought, like his predecessors, to seize the castle of Confolens from the county of Angoulême, then ruled by Count William V. According to the Chronique de Saint-Maixent, he laid siege to it in 1091 and was killed before its walls.

Boso was married, but the name of his wife is unknown. Having no children, he may have designated his childless uncle, Odo, as his heir as he lay dying. His claim was disputed by Boso's sister, Almodis, and her husband, Roger de Montgomery. They were regarded as the legitimate heirs by the author of the Chronique de Saint-Maixent. There may have been civil war and perhaps a division of the county. Odo died not long after Boso and Almodis inherited the county, only to have their claim disputed by Hugh VI of Lusignan, the son of Odo's sister Almodis.

== Bibliography ==
- Lewis, C. P. (1989). "The King and Eye: A Study in Anglo-Norman Politics". The English Historical Review. 104 (412): 569–589. doi:10.1093/ehr/CIV.CCCCXII.569.
- Mortier, Raoul (1912). La Sénéchaussée de la Basse-Marche: Contribution à l'étude de la géographie de l'Ancienne France. Hachette.
- Offler, H. S. (1997). Piper, A. J.; Doyle, A. I. (eds.). "De iniusta vexacione Willelmi episcopi primi per Willelmum regem filium Willelmi magni regis". Camden Fifth Series. 10: 53–104. doi:10.1017/S096011630000083X.
- Painter, Sidney (1957). "The Lords of Lusignan in the Eleventh and Twelfth Centuries". Speculum. 32 (1): 27–47. doi:10.2307/2849244.
- Thomas, Georges (1925–1927). "Les comtes de la Marche de la maison de Charroux (X^{e} siècle– 1177)". Mémoires de la société des sciences naturelles et archéologiques de la Creuse. 23: 561–700.
- Vasselot de Régné, Clément de (2018). Le "Parentat" Lusignan (X^{e}–XIV^{e} siècles): structures, parenté vécue, solidarités et pouvoir d'un lignage arborescent (PhD diss.). University of Nantes.
