= Eschiva of Ibelin (wife of Aimery) =

Queen consort of Cyprus in the late 12th-century

Eschiva of Ibelin (French: Echive; died c. 1197) was a Latin noblewoman of the House of Ibelin from the Kingdom of Jerusalem. She was the first wife of Aimery of Cyprus, who was crowned the first king of Cyprus in 1197. The 13th-century source narrating her abduction by the pirate Kanakes refers to her as queen. She may have died before her husband was crowned.

== Family ==
Eschiva belonged to the House of Ibelin, one of the oldest and most powerful noble families in the Kingdom of Jerusalem. According to the Lignages d'Outremer, Eschiva's parents were Baldwin of Ibelin, lord of Ramla, and his first wife, Richilda, sister of Adam, lord of Bethsan. The historian Wipertus Hugo Rudt de Collenberg has challenged this parentage as chronologically improbable. Eschiva was the elder of Baldwin's daughters; because Baldwin's son, Thomas, is last mentioned as living in 1187 and apparently died childless, the right to Ramla passed to Eschiva. Ramla, however, had been lost to the Ayyubid sultan Saladin after the Battle of Hattin in 1187.

By 1176, Eschiva had married Aimery of Cyprus, a newcomer from Europe. The marriage was arranged by the king of Jerusalem, Baldwin IV. At the time Aimery served as the king's chamberlain. Aimery's marriage with Eschiva secured his rise, and he was later promoted to the office of constable. Eschiva and Aimery had six children: Burgundia, Alice (who died young), Helvis, John, Guy, and Hugh. In 1194 Aimery succeeded his brother Guy as lord of Cyprus. In September 1197 he was crowned the first king of Cyprus, although he may have started using the title already in early 1196. Eschiva is frequently named queen of Cyprus. According to historian Hans E. Mayer, she died as lady of Cyprus before Aimery was crowned.

== Abduction and death ==
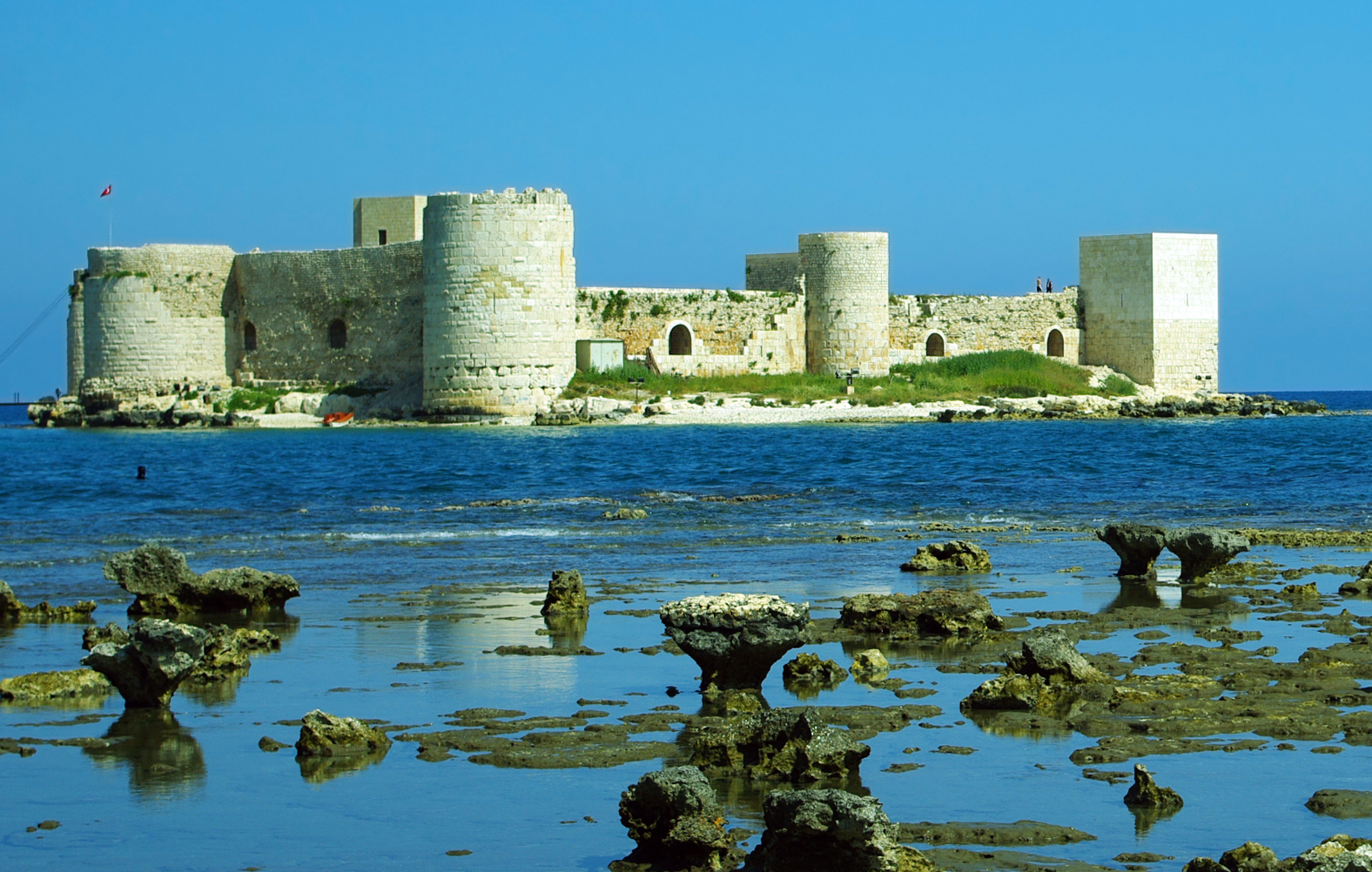
After her rescue from the pirate Kanakes, Eschiva awaited her husband at the Corycus fortress.

A Greek Cypriot rebel named Kanakes evaded Aimery's attempt to arrest him and took refuge in Antioch, using it as a base for destructive raids along the eastern coast of Cyprus. According to the Old French Continuation of William of Tyre, Kanakes happened upon "the queen and her children" during one such raid in the mid-1190s at a seaside village called Paradhisi (just north of Salamis), where Eschiva had gone to recuperate from an illness, and seized them. Eschiva and her children were carried off to Antioch as hostages. The lord of Armenian Cilicia, Leo I, demanded that their captor turn them over safely to him, citing his friendship with Aimery and Eschiva's deceased father. Leo placed them in the fortress of Corycus, from where Aimery soon retrieved them. After securing the release of Eschiva and her children, Leo entered into friendly relations with her husband and family.

Eschiva, who had been in poor health, died soon after her release in the mid-1190s. This was shortly before Aimery's remarriage to Isabella I of Jerusalem, which took place in 1197. Eschiva's death thus enabled Aimery to become king of Jerusalem as well. Eschiva was the ancestress of the Lusignan dynasty of the Kingdom of Cyprus.
