= Walter of Montbéliard =

Regent of Cyprus, constable of Jerusalem

Walter of Montbéliard (died in 1212) (Gauthier I de Montfaucon) was regent of the Kingdom of Cyprus from 1205 to 1210, and Constable of Jerusalem from around 1204 until his death.

== Early life ==
Walter was the second son of Amadeus, Count of Montbéliard. He took the cross after the Fourth Crusade was announced in 1199. Two years later he joined his cousin, Walter III, Count of Brienne, who had laid claim to the Principality of Taranto and other domains in the Kingdom of Sicily and invaded Southern Italy. Before long, Walter left Southern Italy for the Holy Land.

== Cyprus ==
Aimery, King of Cyprus and Jerusalem, gave his eldest daughter, Burgundia, in marriage to Walter and also made him constable of Jerusalem. Aimery died on 1 April 1205 and was succeeded in Cyprus by his ten-year-old son, Hugh I. The High Court elected Walter both guardian of the minor king and regent, violating the custom that prescribed that the two offices were to be separated.

The Seljuks laid siege to Satalia (now Antalya in Turkey), an important port in Asia Minor, in 1207. Satalia was held by an Italian adventurer, Aldobrandino. On Aldobrandino's demand, Walter intervened in the conflict and forced the Seljuks to lift the siege. However, the Greek citizens turned against him and expelled the Cypriot troops from the town with Seljuk assistance.

Walter arranged the marriage of Hugh I with Alice of Champagne, who was the elder surviving daughter of Queen Isabella I of Jerusalem and Count Henry II of Champagne.

Hugh I reached the age of majority in 1210. Walter surrendered his regency, but refused to render an account of his administration of the royal treasury. Instead, he and his family left Cyprus and settled in the Kingdom of Jerusalem. Before long, Walter accused Hugh I of confiscating his estates in Cyprus and expelling him from the island without a fair judgement. In his letter to Pope Innocent III, Walter also referred to an uncanonical election of a bishop in Cyprus, which brought Hugh I into a conflict with the Holy See.

Walter's heir was his daughter, Eschiva, to whom he bequeathed substantial lands in Cyprus.

== Sources ==
- Edbury, Peter W. (1991). The Kingdom of Cyprus and the Crusades, 1191-1374. Cambridge University Press. ISBN 0-521-26876-1.
- Furber, Elizabeth Chapin (1969). "The Kingdom of Cyprus, 1191-1291". In Setton, Kenneth M.; Wolff, Robert Lee; Hazard, Harry W. (eds.). A History of the Crusades. Vol. II: The Later Crusades, 1189–1311. The University of Wisconsin Press. pp. 599–629. ISBN 0-299-04844-6.
- Peters, Edward, ed. (1971). Christian Society and the Crusades, 1198-1229 (2nd ed.). University of Pennsylvania Press.
- Perry, Guy (2013). John of Brienne: King of Jerusalem, Emperor of Constantinople, c. 1175-1237. Cambridge University Press. ISBN 978-1-107-04310-7.
- Runciman, Steven (1989). A History of the Crusades, Volume III: The Kingdom of Acre and the Later Crusades. Cambridge University Press. ISBN 0-521-06163-6.
