= Gastria =

Gastria: Γαστριά (Greek); Kalecik (Turkish)
- Village
- Location in Cyprus
- Coordinates: 35°20′33″N 33°59′57″E
- Country (de jure): Cyprus
  - District: Famagusta District
- Country (de facto): Northern Cyprus
  - District: İskele District

Government
  - Mukhtar: Murat Ozer

Population (2011)
  - Total: 435
- Time zone: UTC+2 (EET)
  - Summer (DST): UTC+3 (EEST)

Gastria (Greek: Γαστριά; Turkish: Kalecik) is a village in the Famagusta District of Cyprus, located on the Karpas Peninsula. It is under the de facto control of Northern Cyprus. The Gastria Castle is located south–west of the village.

== History ==
Around the village are multiple prehistoric sites that have been the subject of archaeological excavations. The Alaas site, located 3 km from the village, contains 19 tombs that have been studied, dated to the Late Bronze Age, between 1090 and 1050 BC. This site was looted in 1973 and items sold to private collectors, who then "helped" the Cypriot Department of Antiquities find the site and excavate it.

The village's name is an archaic plural form of the word "castle" in Greek and comes from the medieval Templar castle found in proximity to the village. The ruins of the castle were visible as late as the 1960s.

Writing in 1961, Nearchos Clerides noted that the modern village of Gastria is "not old", and that it was founded around one hundred years prior to the time of writing by inhabitants of a nearby village called Kamares (no longer extant), who migrated to the site of today's village. These inhabitants consisted entirely of Greek Cypriots, and the village was recorded as being home to 297 people in the 1891 census. The population reached a peak of 376 people in 1946 but then fell significantly to 198 by 1973.

During the 1974 conflict, the village was captured by the Turkish army and thus became a de facto part of Northern Cyprus. Most inhabitants fled in the wake of the advancing Turkish army, but 29 people tried to stay in the village, only to be displaced in September 1976. These around 200 inhabitants are now scattered throughout the southern part of Cyprus. In their place, the village was repopulated with settlers from Turkey in 1976 and 1977, particularly from the Feke and Kozan districts of Adana Province.

== Economy ==
Gastria is home to the Kalecik power plant, a fuel oil-based plant operated by Aksa, which generates 45% of the electricity used in Northern Cyprus and provides employment in the village. Unemployment, particularly for young people, is a common problem.
