= Kanakes =

12th century Cypriot pirate

Kanakes (Old French: Canaqui; fl. 1190s) was a Greek Cypriot pirate and rebel against the House of Lusignan.

The island of Cyprus was conquered by Richard I of England in 1191 and had come under Lusignan rule by 1192. The native Greek population unsuccessfully revolted in 1191 and 1192. Kanakes, who was described in a contemporary Frankish source as a "malefactor" who was "most hated by Christians", led a revolt against Aimery of Lusignan (r. 1194–1205). When he learned that Aimery had put a bounty on him, Kanakes fled Cyprus and found shelter on the southeastern coast of Anatolia. There he allied with Isaac, lord of Antiochetta, who was also from Cyprus. With Isaac's support, Kanakes conducted raids of the coastal settlements on Cyprus from his base in Anatolia, instilling great fear into the populace of the eastern shores.

Kanakes persuaded Isaac to provide him with a small galley so he could attack the Cypriots, a proposal Isaac welcomed. Once equipped, Kanakes became active in the waters around Cyprus. On one occasion he encountered a vessel carrying acquaintances of his and questioned them about Aimery and the situation on the island. From them he learned that Aimery's wife, Eschiva of Ibelin, and her children were staying in the coastal village of Paradhisi (just north of Salamis). Kanakes secretly landed there with a band of followers. Knowing the terrain well, he reached the village at dawn, took Eschiva's attendants unaware, and captured "the queen and her children", whom he then carried off aboard his galley. Kanakes triumphantly returned to Antiochetta, but Leo II of Armenia threatened to attack Isaac if he did not release the hostages, so he promptly did.

The actions of Kanakes are usually interpreted as nothing more than the desperate resistance of a single archon. The historian Angel Nicolaou-Konnari argues that they should not be taken as evidence of any broader uprising with either national or social dimensions. According to him, Kanakes enjoyed no popular support and only wanted to draw profit from the hostages.
