= Hugh VI of Lusignan =

French noble

Hugh VI (c. 1039/1043 – 1102), called the Devilish, was the Lord of Lusignan and Count of La Marche (as Hugh I), the son and successor of Hugh V of Lusignan and Almodis de la Marche.

== Biography ==
Despite his piety, Hugh was in constant conflict with the abbey of St. Maixent. On numerous occasions his disputes with the monks grew so violent that the duke of Aquitaine and the bishops of Poitiers and Saintes had to intercede. At one point, Pope Paschal II threatened Hugh with excommunication. From these conflicts Hugh was dubbed "le diable", the devilish, by the monks of St. Maixent.

In 1086 the Castilian army was destroyed at the Battle of Sagrajas by the Almoravids. Hugh's Catalan half-brother, Berenguer Ramon II, Count of Barcelona was threatened by the Almoravids. Hugh VI undertook an expedition to Spain in 1087 along with another half-brother, Raymond IV of Toulouse, to assist the count of Barcelona.

Hugh took the cross for the First Crusade, along with his brothers Raymond and Berenguer. He participated in the Crusade of 1101 and was killed at the battle of Ramla in 1102.

== Marriage ==
Hugh married in c. 1065, Hildegarde of Thouars, daughter of Aimery IV of Thouars, Viscount of Thouars, and Aurengarde de Mauleon. They had:

- Hugh VII of Lusignan

== Ancestry ==
Ancestors of Hugh VI of Lusignan

8. Hugh III of Lusignan
4. Hugh IV of Lusignan
9. Arsende de Vivonne
2. Hugh V of Lusignan
5. Audearde
1. Hugues VI "Le Diable" de Lusignan, Comte de la Marche
12. Audebert I Comte de la Marche et du Perigord
6. Bernard Comte de la Marché
13. Adalmode de Limoges
3. Almodis of La Marche
14. Cadelon IV Vicomte d'Aulnay
7. Amélie d'Aulney
15. Ameline de Toulouse

== Sources ==
- Hamilton, Bernard (2000). The Leper King and his Heirs: Baldwin IV and the Crusader Kingdom of Jerusalem. Cambridge University Press.
- Painter, Sidney (1957). "The Lords of Lusignan in the Eleventh and Twelfth Centuries". Speculum. 32 (1 Jan). The University of Chicago Press. doi:10.2307/2849244. JSTOR 2849244. S2CID 161153870.
- Riley-Smith, Jonathan (1998). The First Crusaders, 1095–1131. Cambridge University Press.
- Settipani, Christian (2004). La noblesse du Midi carolingien: études sur quelques grandes familles d'Aquitaine et du Languedoc du IX au XI siecles (in French). Prosopographica et Genealogica.

French nobility
Preceded by Boso III	Count of La Marche; 1091–1102	Succeeded by Hugh VII
