= Hugh VII of Lusignan =

French noble (1065–1151)

Hugh VII the Brown of Lusignan or Hugues II de La Marche (French: Hugues le Brun) (1065–1151), Sire de Lusignan, Couhé and Château-Larcher and Count of La Marche, was the son of Hugh VI of Lusignan. He was one of the many notable Crusaders in the Lusignan family. In 1147 he took the Cross and followed King Louis VII of France on the Second Crusade.

== Biography ==
Hugh married before 1090 Sarrasine or Saracena de Lezay (1067–1144), whose origins are unknown. She may have been the same Saracena who was widow of Robert I, Count of Sanseverino. Their children were:

- Hugh VIII of Lusignan
- William de Lusignan, Lord of Angles
- Rorgo de Lusignan
- Simon de Lusignan, Seigneur de Lezay
- Galeran de Lusignan
- Ænor or Aénor de Lusignan (b. c. 1130), married before 1144 Geoffroy V de Thouars (c. 1120 – aft. 1176), Vicomte de Thouars

Hugh is mentioned by troubadour Jaufre Rudel in the envoi of "Quan lo rius de la fontana":

Senes breu de parguamina Tramet lo vers en cantan En plana lengua romana, A'n Ugo Bru per Filhol.	"Without a parchment scroll I send this poem, singing in plain Romance language, to Hugo Brown, through Filhol."

== Sources ==
- Painter, Sidney (1957). "The Lords of Lusignan in the Eleventh and Twelfth Centuries". Speculum. 32 (1, Jan). The University of Chicago Press: 27–47. doi:10.2307/2849244. JSTOR 2849244. S2CID 161153870.
- Riley-Smith, Jonathan (2002). The First Crusaders, 1095-1131. Cambridge University Press.

French nobility
Preceded by Hugh VI	Count of La Marche; 1102–1151	Succeeded by Hugh VIII
