= Aimar V of Limoges =

12th-century French nobleman

Aimar V (Note: His name is also given as Adhemar, Ademar, Adhemir, Aymar, Aymeri, or Ademir.)(c. 1135 – c. 1199) was a Viscount of Limoges and a nobleman in the Duchy of Aquitaine.

== Life ==
Born in Limoges around 1135, his family named him Boson; he later adopted the traditional name for the previous viscounts, Aimar. He was orphaned at a young age in 1148, and raised by his relatives among the southern French aristocracy. Due to the strategic importance of the city of Limoges and the nearby dependent castrum of Aixe-sur-Vienne, Aimar was a ward of King Henry II and ruled from 1148 to approximately 1184, when he was exiled to France and was succeeded by his son Guy.

== Rebellion ==
Aimar is best known for his frequent rebellions against his Plantagenet overlord, Richard the Lionheart, who was Duke of Aquitaine after his mother Eleanor. Aimar, like many of the Aquitanian and Poitevin nobility, participated in sporadic rebellions against ducal authority throughout his adult life, often co-operating with Duke Richard's brothers, as well as the Count of Angoulême and the house of Lusignan, though he was generally brought to heel.

Aimar was outlawed for his insurrection against Henry II and was exiled. He subsequently was found among Stipendiary Knights supporting the Count of Toulouse in 1184 in an attempt to reclaim part of Quercy from the Plantagenets. Aimar's inclination to disobey the Plantagenet Kings, Henry II and Richard, was encouraged by Bertran de Born.

A lament for Aimar by another troubadour, Giraut de Bornelh, suggests that he died unexpectedly. Roger of Hoveden claims that he was killed by Philip of Cognac.

== Marriage and issue ==
Aimar married Sarah de Dunstanville, daughter of Reginald de Dunstanville, 1st Earl of Cornwall, at Bordeaux in 1159. He had been promised the County of Cornwall as an inducement and advancement by King Henry II, who postponed the grant of title indefinitely, which irked Aimar considerably. Aimar and Sarah had:

- Guy
- Marie de Limoges, who married Eble V of Ventadorn, the viscount of Ventadour
- Aigline
- Humberge who married Geoffroy Ier de Lusignan, seigneur de Vouvant.

== Sources ==
- Gillingham, John (1999). Richard I. Yale University Press.
