= Princess of Antioch =

The following is a list of princesses of Antioch.

== princess consort of Antioch ==
=== House of Hauteville, 1098–1163 ===
| Picture | Name | Father | Birth | Marriage | Became princess | Ceased to be princess | Death | Spouse |
|---|---|---|---|---|---|---|---|---|
| | Constance of France | Philip I of France (Capet) | 1078 | 25 March/26 May 1106 | | 3 March 1111 husband's death | 14 September 1126 | Bohemond I |
| | Alice of Jerusalem | Baldwin II of Jerusalem (Rethel) | 1110 | Autumn 1126 | | February 1130 husband's death | 1136–1151 | Bohemond II |

=== House of Poitiers, 1163–1268 ===
| Picture | Name | Father | Birth | Marriage | Became princess | Ceased to be princess | Death | Spouse |
|---|---|---|---|---|---|---|---|---|
| | Orgueilleuse of Harenc | - | - | 1168–1170 | | maybe 1175 divorce | after March 1175 | Bohemond III |
| | Theodora Komnene | probably John Doukas Komnenos, Byzantine Duke in Cyprus (Komnenoi) | 1150/55 | 1175/77 | | 1180 divorce | after 1182 | Bohemond III |
| | Sibylla | - | - | 1181 | | 1199 divorce | 1216 | Bohemond III |
| | Isabella | - | - | 1199 | | 20 March/1 October 1201 husband's death | - | Bohemond III |
| | Plaisance of Gibelet | Hugh III Embriaco, Lord of Giblet (Embriaco) | - | before 21 August 1198 | 20 March/1 October 1201 husband's accession | 1216 husband's death | 1217 | Bohemond IV (1st reign) |
| | Helvis of Lusignan | Amalric II of Jerusalem (Lusignan) | 1196/7 | before 1210 | 1216 husband's accession | 1219 husband's restoration | 7 February 1216/March 1219 | Raymond-Roupen |
| | Melisende of Lusignan | Amalric II of Jerusalem (Lusignan) | after 1200/01 | 1/10 January 1218 | 1219 husband's restoration | March 1233 husband's death | after 1249 | Bohemond IV (2nd reign) |
| | Luciana di Segni | Paolo, Count of Segni (Segni) | - | 1235 | | January 1252 husband's death | - | Bohemond V |
| | Sibylla of Armenia | Hethum I of Armenia (Hethumids) | 1240 | June/October 1254 | | 1268 loss of Antioch | 1290 | Bohemond VI |

== Titular princess consort of Antioch ==
=== House of Poitiers, 1268–1299 ===
| Picture | Name | Father | Birth | Marriage | Became princess | Ceased to be princess | Death | Spouse |
|---|---|---|---|---|---|---|---|---|
| | Sibylla of Armenia | Hethum I of Armenia (Hethumids) | 1240 | June/October 1254 | 1268 loss of Antioch | 11 May/July 1275 husband's death | 1290 | Bohemond VI |
| | Margaret of Brienne | Louis of Acre (Brienne) | - | 2 January 1278 | | 19 October 1287 husband's death | 9 April 1328 | Bohemond VII |

=== House of Toucy, 1299–1300 ===
| Picture | Name | Father | Birth | Marriage | Became princess | Ceased to be princess | Death | Spouse |
|---|---|---|---|---|---|---|---|---|
| | Eleanor of Anjou | Charles II of Naples (Anjou) | August 1289 | 1299 | 1299 husband's accession | 17 January 1300 marriage annulled by the Pope | 9 August 1341 | Philip |

=== House of Lusignan, 1300–1457 ===
Although the ultimate heirs to the Principality of Antioch was the kings of Cyprus, they did not use the title; it was only given to a few heirs to the Cypriot throne and a potential jure uxoris king.

== See also ==
- List of Queens of Jerusalem
- List of Cypriot consorts
- List of Armenian consorts
- List of Latin empresses
