= War of the Antiochene Succession =

War in Syria from 1201 to 1219

Date	1201–1219
Location	Northern Syria and Cilicia
Result	Victory of Bohemond IV of Antioch
Territorial changes	Armenian fortresses lost to the Sultanate of Rum and the Knights Templar

Belligerents
Forces of Raymond-Roupen of Antioch; Cilician Armenia; Knights Hospitaller	Forces of Bohemond IV of Antioch; County of Tripoli; Knights Templar; Emirate of Aleppo; Kingdom of Jerusalem; Sultanate of Rum

Commanders and leaders
Leo of Armenia; Raymond-Roupen	Bohemond IV; William of Chartres; Az-Zahir Ghazi; Kaykaus

The War of the Antiochene Succession was a series of armed conflicts in northern Syria between 1201 and 1219 over the contested succession to Bohemond III of Antioch. The Principality of Antioch, the leading Christian power in the region during the late 12th century, faced a challenge to its dominance from the Armenian Kingdom of Cilicia. The capture of the key Syrian fortress Bagras by Leo II of Cilician Armenia sparked a prolonged conflict in the early 1190s. Leo attempted to seize Antioch, but the Greek and Latin burghers formed a commune that prevented the Armenians from taking control of the city. Bohemond III's eldest son, Raymond, died in 1197, leaving an infant son, Raymond-Roupen, whose mother, Alice, was Leo's niece and heir presumptive. Although Bohemond III and the Antiochene nobility recognised Raymond-Roupen's claim, the commune favoured Bohemond III's younger son, Bohemond, who already held the County of Tripoli.

Upon Bohemond III's death in April 1201, Bohemond of Tripoli took control of Antioch without resistance, prompting many Antiochene nobles to seek refuge in Cilician Armenia. Between 1201 and 1208, Leo launched several invasions against Antioch, but was repeatedly forced to withdraw owing to incursions into Cilicia by two neighbouring Muslim powers: the Seljuks of Rum and the Ayyubids of Aleppo. Though initially backed by Pope Innocent III, Leo was excommunicated in 1208 following his dispute with the Knights Templar over Bagras. Despite this, Leo captured new fortresses in Syria, but abandoned them in 1213 to mend ties with the Holy See. In 1216, exploiting Bohemond IV's political isolation, Leo entered Antioch and helped install Raymond-Roupen as prince. However, Leo soon abandoned Bagras and lost the Armenian strongholds north of the Taurus Mountains to the Seljuks. Raymond-Roupen's unpopular tax increases eroded his support in Antioch, and his deteriorating relationship with Leo weakened his position, enabling Bohemond IV to reclaim the principality in 1219. The war ultimately weakened the Christian states of northern Syria.

== Sources ==
Most records of the war survive in the official archives of two military orders, the Knights Hospitaller and the Teutonic Knights. The relevant documents of the third order, the Knights Templar, were largely lost, while those of the states most directly involved—the Principality of Antioch, the County of Tripoli, and Cilician Armenia—were completely destroyed. Additional information comes from correspondence between the Cilician royal court and the Holy See, as well as a detailed report prepared by papal legates in 1204. Another valuable source is the travel account by Wilbrand of Oldenburg, a German cleric who visited the region during the war. Further frequently cited narrative sources include the early-13th-century Old French continuation of William of Tyre's Chronicon, known as the Estoire d'Eracles, along with chronicles by the Syriac Orthodox bishop Bar Hebraeus, the Armenian aristocrat Sempad the Constable, and the Muslim scholar Ibn al-Athir. Archaeological evidence also contributes to the study of the period, particularly from excavations in the city of Antioch and the fortress of Bagras.

== Background ==
Map of the Eastern Mediterranean c. 1205

After Saladin, the Ayyubid sultan of Syria and Egypt, nearly destroyed the Kingdom of Jerusalem in the late 1180s, Antioch emerged as the leading Christian power in the Levant. By 1186 Leo II, Lord of Cilician Armenia, had recognised the suzerainty of Bohemond III of Antioch, but their relationship became tense after Bohemond defaulted on a loan from Leo. In 1187, Saladin decisively defeated the field army of the Kingdom of Jerusalem at the Battle of Hattin and swiftly conquered nearly all western Christian territories in Syria and Palestine. However, the Third Crusade, a major western European military expedition, ensured the survival of the three Crusader states of Jerusalem, Tripoli, and Antioch.

In 1191, Leo captured and restored Bagras, a strategically important fortress previously taken by Saladin from the Knights Templar. Bohemond demanded its return to the Templars, but Leo refused, arguing that recent conquest outweighed their claim. When Bohemond failed to include Cilician Armenia in his truce with Saladin in 1192, Leo invited him to Bagras under the pretext of negotiation. Bohemond accepted, but was taken prisoner and forced to surrender the city of Antioch. Although the Antiochene nobles—closely tied to Armenian aristocracy—were prepared to accept Leo's rule, the predominantly Greek and Latin townspeople formed a commune and blocked Armenian forces from occupying the city.

Peace was brokered by the ruler of the Kingdom of Jerusalem, Count Henry II of Champagne, who persuaded both Leo and Bohemond to renounce claims of suzerainty over one another. Leo's control of Bagras was confirmed, and Bohemond's eldest son, Raymond, married Leo's niece and heir presumptive in Cilician Armenia, Alice. Raymond died in 1197, shortly before the birth of his son, Raymond-Roupen. Bohemond III, by then nearly sixty, sent Alice and the child to Cilicia, signalling his unwillingness to recognise his infant grandson's claim to Antioch.

Meanwhile, Leo had united the Armenian Church in Cilicia with Rome and accepted the suzerainty of the Holy Roman Emperor, Henry VI. Henry's envoy, Conrad of Wittelsbach, Archbishop of Mainz, was present at Leo's coronation as the first king of Cilician Armenia on 6 January 1198. Shortly afterwards, Conrad travelled to Antioch and secured oaths from Bohemond and his barons to accept Raymond-Roupen's right to succession. Bohemond III's younger son, Bohemond of Tripoli, disputed the oath's legitimacy. With the backing of the Templars, the Hospitallers, and the burghers' commune, he expelled his father from Antioch in late 1198. Three months later, Leo invaded the principality, compelling the younger Bohemond to allow his father's return. Pope Innocent III also supported Bohemond III's restoration, but, responding to the Templars' demand, began urging Leo to return Bagras to them.

Claimants to Antioch (bolded) with their relatives and allies

Stephen of Armenia
Bohemond III of Antioch
Roupen III of Armenia
Aimery of Cyprus	Isabella I of Jerusalem	Henry II of Champagne
Alice of Armenia	Raymond IV of Tripoli
**Raymond-Roupen of Antioch**	Helvis of Cyprus	Hugh I of Cyprus	Leo I of Armenia	Sibylla of Cyprus	Melisende of Cyprus	**Bohemond IV of Antioch**
Maria of Jerusalem	John of Brienne	Stephanie of Armenia	Isabella of Armenia

== War ==
=== First phase ===
Signature of Leo, the first king of Cilician Armenia. He took up arms for his young grandnephew Raymond-Roupen to seize the Principality of Antioch from Raymond-Roupen's uncle Bohemond IV.

When Bohemond III died in April 1201, his surviving son Bohemond hurried from Tripoli to Antioch, where the townspeople's commune acknowledged him as the rightful heir, being the late prince's closest living relative. Some nobles backed the rival claim of Raymond-Roupen, the only son of the late prince's eldest son, Raymond; however, they were soon forced to flee to Cilician Armenia. The new prince, Bohemond IV secured the Hospitallers' support by repaying a long-outstanding loan.

The war, which extended across multiple fronts, was fuelled by Leo's continued backing of Raymond-Roupen's claim. Throughout the conflict, neither Leo nor Bohemond IV was able to hold both his own territory (Cilician Armenia or Tripoli) and Antioch simultaneously, due to limited military resources. Az-Zahir Ghazi, Ayyubid emir of Aleppo, and the Seljuk sultans of Rum repeatedly threatened Cilician Armenia, while Ayyubid rulers of Hama and Homs controlled the lands between Antioch and Tripoli, restricting Bohemond's troop movements.

Shortly after Bohemond assumed power in Antioch, Leo laid siege to the city to advance Raymond-Roupen's cause. However, Bohemond's Muslim allies—az-Zahir Ghazi and Sultan Suleiman II of Rum—invaded Cilician Armenia, forcing Leo to retreat in July 1201. Leo subsequently sent letters to Pope Innocent, alerting him to Bohemond's dealings with the two Muslim rulers. He renewed his campaign in 1202, but a truce was brokered by Aimery (King of Jerusalem and Cyprus), and the papal legate, Cardinal Soffredo. As Bohemond IV refused to acknowledge the Holy See's authority over the succession dispute, Leo resumed the war in 1203. Taking advantage of Bohemond's absence, he entered Antioch on 11 November, but failed to capture the citadel, which was held by the Templars and communal forces. Az-Zahir Ghazi soon invaded Cilician Armenia again, forcing Leo to withdraw from Antioch.

In May 1204, Bohemond did homage to Marie of Champagne, wife and representative of Baldwin, the first Latin emperor of Constantinople, thereby recognising Baldwin as the lawful successor to the Byzantine emperors. This move aimed to counter Leo's alliance with the German imperial court. (Note: Marie had travelled to the Holy Land during the Fourth Crusade to join her husband, one of its leaders, in the city of Acre—unaware that the crusade had been diverted to Constantinople, the Byzantine capital. The crusaders sacked the city in April 1204 and elected Baldwin emperor the following month. Among Bohemond's predecessors, Bohemond I acknowledged Byzantine suzerainty in 1108, followed by Raymond of Poitiers in 1137, Raynald of Châtillon in 1158, and Bohemond III in 1165.) That same year, Renoart of Nephin, a Tripolitan aristocrat, married an heiress without Bohemond's consent and was condemned by the royal court. In defiance, Renoart rebelled and routed Bohemond near the gates of Tripoli, where Bohemond lost an eye. Exploiting the turmoil, Leo seized Antiochene fortresses in the Amanus Mountains, taking control of the route to Antioch. On 25 December 1205, he besieged the fortress at Trapessac, but his army was routed by az-Zahir Ghazi's forces. Meanwhile, Bohemond had crushed Renoart's rebellion in Tripoli and returned to Antioch, compelling Leo to sign an eight-year truce in the summer of 1206.

=== Conflicts with the Church ===
By the time Bohemond returned, the papal legate Peter of Capua had also come to Antioch. Though initially acting as a neutral mediator between Bohemond and Leo, he soon clashed with the city's Latin patriarch, Peter of Angoulême—a supporter of Raymond-Roupen—over church appointments. The dispute led to the suspension of Peter of Angoulême's patriarchal authority. Taking advantage of the situation, Bohemond replaced Peter of Angoulême with the Greek Orthodox patriarch, Symeon II, with the support of the commune in early 1207. This uncanonical move provoked outrage among the Catholic clergy and laity.

In 1208, Patriarch Peter reconciled with the legate, excommunicated Bohemond and the commune, and incited some nobles to revolt. Bohemond retreated to the citadel. Before long, Leo entered Antioch, but Bohemond countered with a sortie and defeated him. Peter of Angoulême was captured and died of dehydration in prison. The same year, the Ayyubid sultan al-Adil I invaded Tripoli, giving Leo the chance to raid the region around Antioch, but Bohemond persuaded Kaykaus I, Sultan of Rum, to invade Cilician Armenia, forcing Leo to retreat. Pope Innocent appointed Albert Avogadro, Patriarch of Jerusalem, to mediate peace. A supporter of the Templars, Avogadro urged Leo to return Bagras to their control. Leo promised to do so but soon broke his word, preferring instead to grant Cilician fortresses to the Teutonic Knights. He also ended the church union with Rome and arranged the marriage of Raymond-Roupen to Helvis, sister of Hugh I of Cyprus.

In 1211, Leo ambushed a Templar supply caravan and William of Chartres, Grand Master of the Templars, was badly injured. The attack shocked Pope Innocent, who forbade Christian rulers from assisting Leo and urged John of Brienne, King of Jerusalem, to intervene. John dispatched fifty knights to northern Syria, prompting Leo to expel the Latin priests from Cilicia and give refuge to Symeon, the Orthodox patriarch previously driven from Antioch. By 1212, Raymond-Roupen reached the age of majority and was sent to raid the region of Antioch.

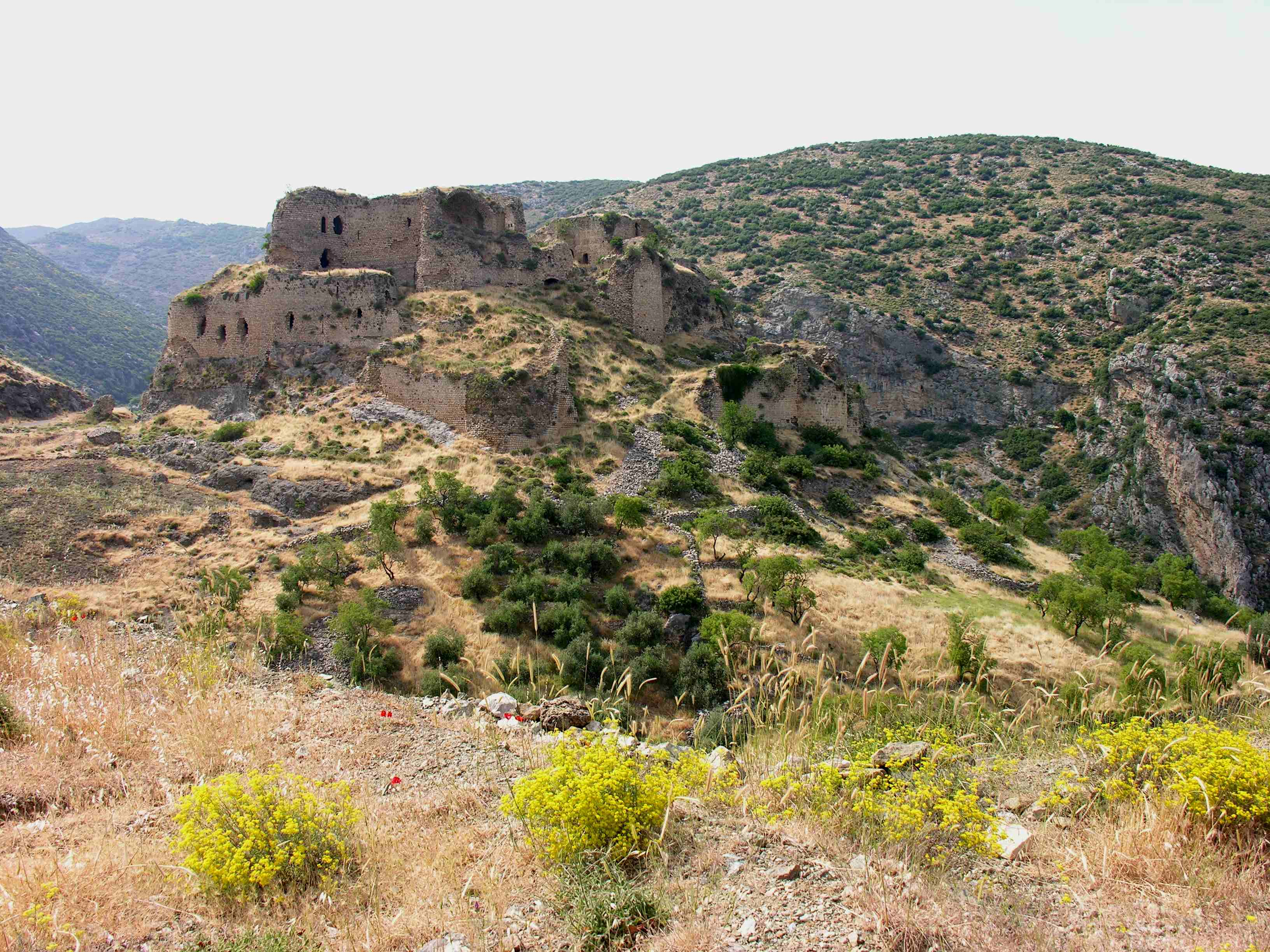
Ruins of Bagras: the long-standing dispute over its possession was a major source of tension between Cilician Armenia and the Templars for decades.

Recognising that he could not overcome Bohemond without reconciling with the Templars, the papacy and Jerusalem, Leo agreed to return all lands seized from the Templars, except Bagras. He also married his eldest daughter, Stephanie, to John of Brienne. These gestures appeased Pope Innocent, who lifted Leo's excommunication. At the same time, Bohemond's position weakened. The Assassins—who controlled the area between Antioch and Tripoli—murdered his eldest son, Raymond, in 1213. (Note: The historian Steven Runciman suggests that the Hospitallers arranged Raymond's assassination, noting that their other rival, Albert of Vercelli, Latin Patriarch of Jerusalem, was also killed by Assassins the following year.) The following year, Bohemond attacked their stronghold at Khawabi, but the Assassins sought assistance from az-Zahir Ghazi of Aleppo. Fearing Bohemond's growing power, az-Zahir allied with al-Adil, compelling Bohemond to abandon the siege and shift his focus on defending Tripoli.

=== Raymond-Roupen in Antioch ===
With Leo's backing, Raymond-Roupen began securing allies in Antioch from c. 1215, promising land grants to the Hospitallers and local nobles, including Acharie of Sermin, leader of the commune. Seizing the opportunity created by Bohemond IV's absence, Leo and his army entered Antioch during the night of 14 February 1216. Within days, the Templars, who held the citadel, surrendered without resistance. Raymond-Roupen was consecrated prince by the new Latin patriarch, Peter of Ivrea. Once in control of the principality, Leo returned Bagras to the Templars. However, during his absence from Cilicia, Kaykaus I captured Armenian forts north of the Taurus Mountains, compelling Leo to concentrate on the defence of his kingdom.

In Antioch, Raymond-Roupen found the treasury empty and responded by increasing taxes, quickly alienating the population. His relationship with Leo also soured. In 1217, he attempted to capture Leo, but the Templars intervened and rescued the Armenian king. Early the next year, Leo's son-in-law, John of Brienne, acknowledged Bohemond as Antioch's rightful prince but took no action to restore him against Raymond-Roupen. Bohemond's support strengthened through his marriage to Melisende, half-sister of King Hugh. Rising discontent in Antioch led to a revolt in 1219. Its leader, William Farabel, invited Bohemond to return. Upon Bohemond's arrival, Raymond-Roupen sought refuge in the citadel but soon fled to Cilicia after ceding the citadel to the Hospitallers. He never regained Antioch.

== Aftermath ==
Leo was dying when Raymond-Roupen arrived in Cilician Armenia. With Bohemond restored and Leo's death in May 1219, the war, in the words of the historian Jochen Burgtorf, "came to a rather unspectacular end". In his will, Leo disinherited Raymond-Roupen and left the kingdom to his five-year-old daughter, Isabella. Both Raymond-Roupen and John of Brienne rejected the will and laid claim to Cilician Armenia. The resulting dispute further weakened the Christian states of northern Syria.

== See also ==
- Crusades
- Eastern Catholic Churches

== Sources ==
- Barber, Malcolm (2012). The Crusader States. Yale University Press. ISBN 978-0-300-11312-9.
- Burgtorf, Jochen (2016). "The Antiochene War of Succession". In Boas, Adrian J. (ed.). The Crusader World. The Routledge Worlds. The University of Wisconsin Press. pp. 196–211. ISBN 978-0-415-82494-1.
- Ghazarian, Jacob G. (2000). The Armenian Kingdom in Cilicia during the Crusades: The Integration of Cilician Armenians with the Latins, 1180–1393. RoutledgeCurzon. ISBN 978-0-7007-1418-6.
- Hardwicke, Mary Nickerson (1969) [1962]. "The Crusader States, 1192–1243". In Setton, Kenneth M.; Wolff, Robert Lee; Hazard, Harry (eds.). The Later Crusades, 1189–1311. A History of the Crusades. Vol. II (Second ed.). The University of Wisconsin Press. pp. 522–554. ISBN 978-0-299-04844-0.
- Kennedy, Hugh (2006). "Ibn al-Athīr (1160–1233)". In Murray, Alan V. (ed.). D–J. The Crusades: An Encyclopedia. Vol. II. ABC Clio. p. 625. ISBN 978-1-57607-862-4.
- Lock, Peter (1995). The Franks in the Aegean, 1204–1500. Longman. ISBN 978-0-58-205139-3.
- Murray, Alan V. (2006). "William of Tyre (d. 1186)". In Murray, Alan V. (ed.). Q–Z. The Crusades: An Encyclopedia. Vol. IV. ABC Clio. pp. 1281–1282. ISBN 978-1-57607-862-4.
- Perry, Guy (2013). John of Brienne: King of Jerusalem, Emperor of Constantinople, c. 1175–1237. Cambridge University Press. ISBN 978-1-107-04310-7.
- Runciman, Steven (1989) [1951]. The Kingdom of Acre and the Later Crusades. A History of the Crusades. Vol. III. Cambridge University Press. ISBN 978-0-521-06163-6.
- Rüdt-Collenberg, Count W. H. (1963). The Rupenides, Hethumides and Lusignans: The Structure of the Armeno–Cilician Dynasties. Calouste Gulbenkian Foundation Library. OCLC 5122239.
- Weltecke, Dorothea (2006). "Bar Ebroyo (1226–1286)". In Murray, Alan V. (ed.). A–C. The Crusades: An Encyclopedia. Vol. I. ABC Clio. p. 152. ISBN 978-1-57607-862-4.
