= Melisende of Lusignan =

Princess of Antioch (c. 1200–c. 1249)

Melisende of Cyprus (c. 1200 – c. 1249) was a princess of the House of Lusignan. She was a daughter of Queen Isabella I of Jerusalem and King Aimery of Cyprus and wife of Prince Bohemond IV of Antioch. She claimed the regency of the Kingdom of Jerusalem in 1246 as the closest relative of King Conrad II, but it was awarded to her nephew King Henry I of Cyprus instead.

== Youth ==
Melisende was born around 1200. She was the youngest daughter of Queen Isabella I of Jerusalem. Her father was King Aimery of Cyprus. Aimery was Isabella's fourth husband; she his second wife. While Aimery's children from his first marriage carried Lusignan names, those born to him and Isabella were named after their maternal relatives; Melisende was named after her mother's grandmother Queen Melisende of Jerusalem. Because their mother already had four daughters from her previous marriages, Melisende and her sister, Sibylla, had little chance of inheriting the crown of Jerusalem. Aimery and Isabella both died in 1205. The Kingdom of Jerusalem passed to Maria of Montferrat, Melisende's half-sister and the eldest of Isabella's five surviving daughters, while the Kingdom of Cyprus was inherited by Hugh I, Aimery's son from his first marriage. Melisende and Sibylla came under the guardianship of their half-brother Hugh.

King Hugh initially supported the Armenians in the War of the Antiochene Succession, arranging in 1210 for his sister Helvis to marry the Armenian claimant, Raymond-Roupen, and half-sister Sibylla to marry Raymond-Roupen's granduncle King Leo I of Armenia. When Raymond-Roupen's fortunes declined in his struggle with his uncle Bohemond IV over the Principality of Antioch, Hugh changed sides and gave Melisende in marriage to the recently widowed Bohemond. The wedding was held in January 1218 in Tripoli, where Bohemond ruled as count, and attended by King Andrew II of Hungary, who had come with the Fifth Crusade. Hugh fell ill and died during the celebrations.

Bohemond took control of Antioch in 1219. Around 1220, Melisende gave birth to their daughter, Maria of Antioch. Like other 13th-century princesses of Antioch, Melisende had little influence; neither she nor Bohemond's first wife, Plaisance of Gibelet, are mentioned in the charters Bohemond issued as prince of Antioch. Bohemond died in March 1233.

== Claimant ==
In 1243 Melisende's half-sister Alice of Champagne, by then the oldest surviving daughter of their mother, Isabella, became regent of the Kingdom of Jerusalem in the name of King Conrad II, the grandson of Alice and Melisende's half-sister Maria. Conrad lived in Europe, and Alice was declared regent by the High Court of Jerusalem because she was the king's closest relative who lived in the Latin East. When Alice died in 1246, both Melisende and Henry I of Cyprus, Alice's son, claimed the regency. Although Melisende was more closely related to Conrad than her nephew was, the High Court awarded the regency to Henry. No account of how this came to pass survives, but it is likely that he was more desirable because he was a man and a crowned ruler in his own right; there are also signs that he outbidded Melisende by granting land to the members of the High Court.

Melisende died around 1249. After the extinction of Maria of Montferrat's line in 1269, Melisende's daughter, Maria of Antioch, unsuccessfully claimed the throne of Jerusalem.

Melisende's relationship with the ruling houses of Jerusalem, Cyprus, Antioch, and Armenia

Stephen of Armenia
Bohemond III of Antioch
Roupen III of Armenia
Aimery of Cyprus	Isabella I of Jerusalem
Alice of Armenia	Raymond IV of Tripoli
Raymond-Roupen of Antioch	Helvis of Cyprus	Maria of Jerusalem	Hugh I of Cyprus	Alice of Champagne	Sibylla of Cyprus	Leo I of Armenia	Melisende of Cyprus	Bohemond IV of Antioch
Isabella II of Jerusalem	Henry I of Cyprus
Conrad II of Jerusalem
