= Bohemond V of Antioch =

Prince of Antioch from 1233 to 1252

Bohemond V

Prince of Antioch Count of Tripoli
- Reign: March 1233 − January 1252
- Predecessor: Bohemond IV
- Successor: Bohemond VI
- Died: January 1252
- Spouse: Alice of Champagne; Lucia of Segni
- Issue: Plaisance of Antioch; Bohemond VI of Antioch
- House: House of Poitiers
- Father: Bohemond IV of Antioch
- Mother: Plaisance of Gibelet

Bohemond V was the prince of Antioch and count of Tripoli from March 1233 until his death in January 1252. He was the son and successor of Bohemond IV, whose policies he largely continued.

In the late 1220s, Bohemond and his first wife, Queen Alice of Cyprus, struggled for the government of the Kingdom of Cyprus against her uncles Philip and John of Ibelin. Their marriage was dissolved before Bohemond succeeded his father. He henceforth avoided participating in the affairs of the neighboring states, aside from his own conflicts with Armenians and Muslims. He had some difficulties with Patriarch Albert, but otherwise strove to have good relations with the Latin Church; in 1238, he married Pope Gregory IX's kinswoman Lucia of Segni. He resided mostly in Tripoli, which was the more prosperous of his cities. He was succeeded by his son Bohemond VI.

== Family ==
Bohemond V was the second son of Bohemond IV, who was prince of Antioch and count of Tripoli in Syria, and Bohemond IV's first wife, Plaisance of Gibelet. Bohemond V's older brother, Raymond, was murdered by the Assassins in 1213. Princess Plaisance had died by 1217, when his father married Melisende of Cyprus. Another brother, Philip, was killed in 1225 on the orders of Constantine of Baberon and his allies, who then forced Philip's widow, Queen Isabella of Armenia, to marry Constantine's son Hethum.

== Struggle for Cyprus ==
In 1225—or possibly late 1224—Bohemond married the queen dowager of Cyprus, Alice of Champagne. She was the regent of Cyprus in the name of her underage son, King Henry I, but had appointed her uncle Philip of Ibelin to rule the kingdom as her bailli (lieutenant), only to fall out with him and leave for Syria. Alice intended to install Bohemond as bailli in place of Philip, but the High Court of Cyprus refused on the grounds that Bohemond might harm Henry. On 11 August 1225, Pope Honorius III—probably prompted by the concerned barons—instructed the archbishop of Nicosia, Eustorge of Montaigu, to investigate whether Alice and Bohemond were too closely related to marry; the couple were third cousins.

Cypriot nobles opposed to the Ibelin regime began gathering in Tripoli. Bohemond and Alice sent one of them, William of Rivet, and the master of Antioch's cathedral school to the papal curia in Rome to defend the couple's marriage. The Ibelins' opponents hoped for help from Emperor Frederick II, who claimed suzerainty over Cyprus and who planned to come to Syria with the Sixth Crusade. Shortly before his's death in March 1227, Pope Honorius withdrew his commission to investiage Bohemond and Alice's marriage from Archbishop Eustorge. He had been convinced by either Frederick or William and his companion that Eustorge would not judge Bohemond and Alice's marriage justly. In place of Eustorge, Honorius appointed the Latin patriarch of Jerusalem, Gerold of Lausanne, and the bishop of Acre, James of Vitry, a decision endorsed by his successor, Gregory IX.

Hoping to gain power in Cyprus with Frederick's help, Bohemond and Alice joined other leading Franks from Cyprus and Syria in mid-1227 at the Cypriot city of Limassol, where they expected to greet Frederick, but Frederick stayed behind because of an illness. That year, Philip died and the High Court elected his brother, John, to succeed him as bailli. Frederick arrived in Limassol in 1228. Bohemond IV joined him, but left after Frederick demanded from him an oath of fealty, and the men of Antioch and Tripoli subsequently took no part in the crusade; because of this, Frederick made no effort to support Bohemond V and Alice. By 1229, the couple's marriage had been annulled.

== Reign ==
=== State of Antioch ===
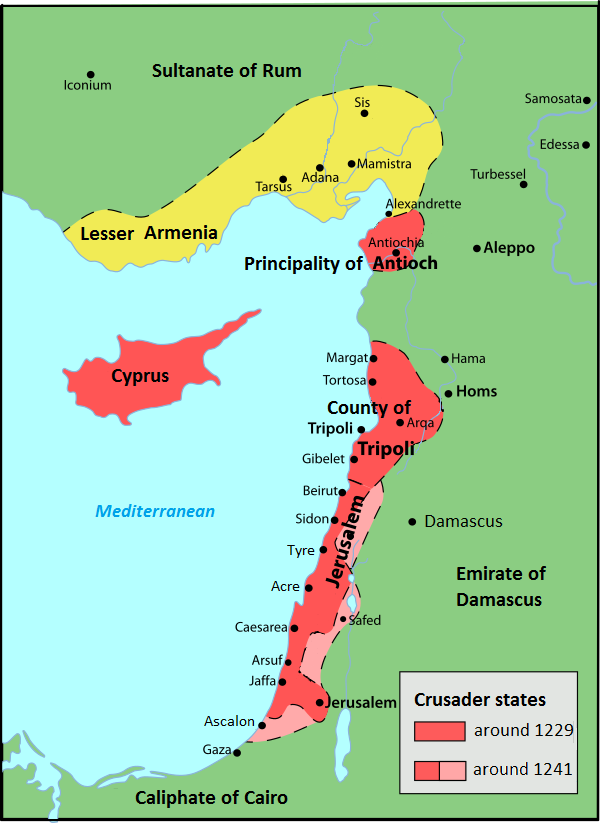
Bohemond's domain was split into two by hostile neighbors.

Upon the death of Bohemond IV in March 1233, Bohemond V became prince of Antioch and count of Tripoli. He inherited a flourishing County of Tripoli, but the Principality of Antioch to its north—cut off by the Muslim-ruled Latakia—struggled after the War of the Antiochene Succession and Muslim incursions. He was not as popular with the Commune of Antioch as his father had been; it may be that the city's strong Greek element disapproved of his efforts to foster good relations with the Latin Church. Consequently, he preferred to reside in Tripoli and rarely visited Antioch.

Bohemond soon found that Antioch was virtually controlled by the orders of the Temple and the Hospital, which they paid little heed to him and conducted their own wars against Muslims. Already in 1233, he sent his brother Henry to assist the Hospitallers, alongside the armies of the kingdoms of Cyprus and Jerusalem, in an attack on Muslim-ruled Baarin. The campaign ended when the defenders promised to pay a tribute to the Hospital. A truce lasted until 1237, when the Templars from Bagras attacked Turkoman tribes near the Lake of Antioch. In revenge, a Muslim army from Aleppo laid siege to Bagras. Bohemond marched to relieve Bagras and renewed the truce. The Temple's preceptor in Antioch, William of Montferrat, resented this imposition and attacked Trapessac in June 1237 against Bohemond's expressed wishes; the Templars were soundly defeated and William was killed.

=== Church relations ===
Bohemond also inherited his father's tense relationship with the Latin patriarch of Antioch, Albert of Rezzato. Albert demanded Bohemond's homage for the principality (as patriarchs had demanded from previous princes), but Bohemond refused. According to Pope Gregory IX, Bohemond arrested several of the Albert's officials, including the castellan of Qusair, because the castellan had ordered the murderer of a priest to be hanged. Albert continued to complain to the Roman papacy about Bohemond's violations of his rights, but he avoided confrontation and never excommunicated him.

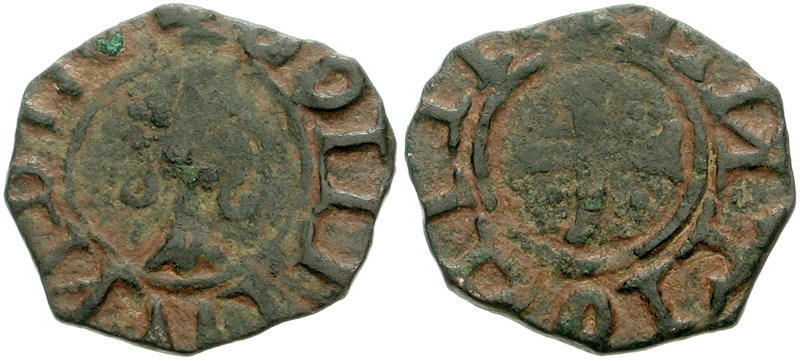
A copper coin of Bohemond V

Early in Bohemond's reign, the Armenian Kingdom of Cilicia was a hostile neighbor, and Bohemond was eager to exact revenge on the Hethumids for the death of his brother Philip. He aided the Templars when Armenians attacked Bagras and reluctantly agreed to peace with King Hethum. With the support of Patriarch Albert, he tried to undermine Hethum's claim to the throne by petioning Pope Gregory IX to dissolve Hethum's marriage with Queen Isabella. Gregory initially ordered an inquiry into the marriage, but realized that Bohemond's efforts put into jeopardy Gregory's ambitions to unite the Armenian Church with that of Rome. He consequently forbade Bohemond and King Henry of Cyprus to attack the Armenians. Relations improved after Henry married Hethum's sister Stephanie in 1237.

Bohemond proved keener to maintain good relations with the Roman Catholic Church than his father had been. He allowed Pope Gregory IX to arrange for him a second marriage. In 1238, he married the pope's cousin Lucia of Segni. As a result of this union, Bohemond's entourage became satured with Roman knights and the prebends of Tripoli with Roman clergy, which his vassals resented. He and Lucia had a son, Bohemond VI, and a daughter, Plaisance.

=== Southern wars ===
Like his father before him, Bohemond V made every effort to avoid becoming involved in the affairs of his neighbours. He stayed out of the long war (1228–1243) between his former wife, Alice, and Emperor Frederick over the regency of the Kingdom of Jerusalem, but maintained good relations with Frederick. After Alice's party prevailed, Bohemond provided shelter in Tripoli to Frederick's men Lothair Filangieri and Thomas of Acerra, annoying the pope, but declined to assist them further. After the Khwarazmians sacked Jerusalem in 1244, Bohemond sent his cousins John and William of Botron and his constable, John of Ham, to assist a Franko-Ayyubid coalition against the Egyptian ruler As-Salih Ayyub and his Khwarazmian allies; the latter were victorious in the ensuing Battle of La Forbie. This defeat saw the destruction of the cavalry of Antioch and Tripoli, and Bohemond's lands were left exposed.

Soon after the defeat at La Forbie, the Latin patriarch of Jerusalem, Robert of Nantes, requested help from Western Europe. King Louis IX of France consequently decided to lead the Seventh Crusade. Louis arrived with his army in Egypt in May 1249. Bohemond took the opportunity to request 600 archers to protect his state from Turkoman raiders. Bohemond died in January 1252, shortly after his daughter, Plaisance, became the third wife of King Henry of Cyprus. Bohemond's son and successor, Bohemond VI, was still underage, and so the reins of power passed to the widowed Princess Lucia.

Preceded by Bohemond IV	Prince of Antioch; Count of Tripoli; 1233–1252	Succeeded by Bohemond VI
