= Raymond of Antioch =

Raymond of Antioch may refer to:

- Raymond of Poitiers, prince of Antioch from 1136 to 1149
- Raymond IV, Count of Tripoli, regent of Antioch from 1193 to 1194
- Raymond of Antioch (died 1213), heir of Antioch from 1201 until 1213
- Raymond-Roupen, prince of Antioch from 1216 to 1219
