= Maria of Antioch (pretender) =

Claimant to the Jerusalemite throne (c. 1220–1307)

Maria of Antioch (c. 1220 – after 10 December 1307) was a claimant to the throne of the Kingdom of Jerusalem from 1268 to 1277. In 1267, she submitted her claim to rule the kingdom as regent in the name of the absentee King Conrad III, her first cousin twice removed, to the High Court. Her legal case was solid, resting on the proximity of blood to the king, but the court found in favor of her nephew King Hugh III of Cyprus after she abruptly left the proceedings. When Conrad died in 1268, she demanded to be crowned as his successor and disrupted Hugh's coronation. Spurned yet again, she moved to Europe and in 1277 sold her claim to King Charles I of Sicily. Charles and his successor, Charles II, paid a pension to her and provided for her upkeep in southern Italy. Later in life, she laid claim to the defunct County of Tripoli.

== Family ==
Maria was born around 1220. She was the daughter of Bohemond IV, prince of Antioch and count of Tripoli, and his second wife, Melisende of Cyprus. Maria had four paternal half-brothers, including Bohemond V and Henry. Her mother, Melisende, was the youngest daughter of Queen Isabella I of Jerusalem and King Aimery of Cyprus. Melisende's eldest half-sister, Maria, and her descendants inherited the Kingdom of Jerusalem, but the kingdom was by then a rump state reduced to Acre and a narrow coastal strip without Jerusalem itself. Another of Melisende's half-sisters, Alice of Champagne, ruled the kingdom as regent in the name of the minor and absent King Conrad II, Queen Maria's grandson, until her death in 1246. At that point, Melisende put forward a claim to the regency as Conrad's closest living relative, but the High Court of Jerusalem rejected her in favor of King Henry I of Cyprus, Alice's son. Henry was likely more desirable because he was a man and already a crowned ruler, and he apparently granted land to the members of the High Court to sway them. Maria's half-brother Henry married King Henry's sister Isabella, and they had a son, Hugh. Maria never married and had no children.

Maria's kinship with the kings and queens, regents, and claimants to the throne of Jerusalem

Isabella I of Jerusalem
Maria of Jerusalem	Alice of Champagne	Philippa of Champagne	Sibylla of Cyprus	Melisende of Cyprus
Isabella II of Jerusalem	Henry I of Cyprus	Maria of Cyprus	Isabella of Cyprus	Maria of Antioch
Conrad II of Jerusalem	Hugh II of Cyprus	Hugh of Brienne	Hugh III of Cyprus
Conrad III of Jerusalem

== High Court cases ==
In the 1260s, the thrones of the kingdoms of Jerusalem and Cyprus were occupied by two underage kings, Conrad III and Hugh II, respectively, descended from the older half-sisters of Maria's mother. Conrad lived in Europe, and so the regency of Jerusalem was nominally vested in Hugh II. But since Hugh II was a minor too, the regency was exercised first by his mother, Plaisance of Antioch, who died in 1261, and then by his aunt Isabella, who died in 1264. The young king's cousins Hugh of Brienne and Hugh of Antioch then disputed the right to exercise the regency of Jerusalem on his behalf. The High Court of Jerusalem selected Hugh of Antioch, Isabella's son and Maria's nephew.

Hugh II died in 1267, and was succeeded as king of Cyprus by Hugh of Antioch (Hugh III). In addition to the throne of Cyprus, Hugh III claimed the regency of the Kingdom of Jerusalem, and the High Court was prepared to accept him. But when Hugh sailed to Acre in May 1268, Maria challenged his claim. The lord of Tyre, Philip of Montfort, and the Knights Templar and Hospitaller arranged a meeting between aunt and nephew in Tyre. The High Court then met in the presence of both claimants, and Maria had a clerk read out a formal plea explaining her ancestry and claim. She asserted that the regency should belong to her because she was, by one degree, more closely related to Conrad III, and the only surviving grandchild of Isabella I. After hearing her plea, Hugh asked her if it reflected her own view and then rose to address the court. He insisted that he had a better claim because he was more closely related to the previous regents.

Maria's case was legally stronger than Hugh's, but as the court prepared to withdraw to deliberate, Maria abruptly left without responding to Hugh's arguments. Three members of the court went after her, but she refused to return to hear the verdict. The High Court apparently recognized the superiority of Maria's claim and used her absence to justify awarding the regency to Hugh, arguing that she was in default. In reality, Hugh was preferable because—unlike Maria—he had experience in government and Cypriot troops which could contribute to the defense of the dwindling kingdom against the Egyptian sultan Baibars. The acquisition of the regency made Hugh heir presumptive to King Conrad.

Conrad was executed on the orders of King Charles I of Sicily on 29 October 1268. Hugh duly became king of Jerusalem, but Maria continued to contest his title. She demanded that she be crowned by the Latin patriarch of Jerusalem, William of Agen, but William instructed the bishop of Lydda, John of Troyes, to crown Hugh. John dismissed her claim with contempt, deeming it worthless. The Templars supported her claim, possibly because they expected her to be a weak ruler or to sell the kingdom to Charles. A sale, rather than a wish to rule, may have been Maria's principal motivation for claiming the throne. Hugh's coronation was thus postponed; he was crowned on 24 September 1269 in the Cathedral of the Holy Cross in Tyre. Maria had a clerk and a notary interrupt the ceremony with a protest on her behalf, after which they ran out of the cathedral. She appealed to the Templars for support before leaving the kingdom.

== Life in Europe ==
In late 1270, Maria reached Sicily and from there went to Naples. A ship carrying her goods was wrecked at Milazzo; in January 1271, King Charles ordered that her property be salvaged from the wreck. The loss may have caused lasting financial troubles for Maria. From Naples, she went to Rome, where she received a warm welcome from Pope Gregory X, who clarified that his having addressed Hugh as king of Jerusalem did not mean that he recognized Hugh's claim over hers. On 24 October 1272, Gregory authorised the archbishop of Nazareth, Guy de Paladru, the bishop of Bethlehem, Gaillard d'Ossau, and the bishop of Banyas to investigate the succession dispute. Maria appeared at the Second Council of Lyons to present her claim again. The papal curia knew that her claim was better than Hugh's, but the cardinal bishop of Albano, Bonaventure, explained that only the High Court of Jerusalem had the power to decide their monarch. Maria accepted the argument, possibly in 1276, and asked the judges to quash the case because she was too poor to proceed. In September 1276, Charles gave her a house in Naples. According to the Chronicle of Paolino Veneto, Charles twice offered to marry Maria, but the historian George Francis Hill is skeptical.

In March 1277, Maria sold her claim to Charles for annual payments of 4,000 livres tournois and 10,000 Saracen bezants from Acre. He claimed, probably falsely, that many princes had refused Maria's offer before he accepted. The sale was unprecedented and breached the kingdom's inheritance laws. After the sale, Charles promptly sent Roger of San Severino to occupy the kingdom for him. Roger arrived in Acre with credentials signed by Charles, Maria, and Pope John XXI. Frustrated by the opposition he faced, Hugh did not resist, but Charles was never universally accepted as king and Hugh's son Henry II regained Acre in 1285.

In 1289, the Mamluks of Egypt destroyed the County of Tripoli. Its last countess, Maria's grandniece Lucia, fades from history soon after. Maria then began styling herself countess of Tripoli. When Acre fell to the Mamluks in 1291, the Kingdom of Jerusalem was finally destroyed too. King Charles II confirmed Maria's annuity, but it is doubtful that she received all the money. In May 1294, she received Canosa di Puglia and did homage for it. She died after 10 December 1307, when she is last mentioned in documents. Her claim to Tripoli passed to the kings of Cyprus, whose family became the sole surviving descendants of her father, Bohemond IV.
