= Philip of Antioch =

King of Armenian Cilicia from 1222 to 1225

King of Armenian Cilicia (Jure uxoris)
- Reign: 1222–1225
- Predecessor: Isabella
- Successor: Isabella
- Died: 1225; Partzerpert near Sis
- Spouse: Isabella, Queen of Armenia
- House: House of Poitiers
- Father: Bohemond IV of Antioch
- Mother: Plaisance of Gibelet

Philip of Antioch (Armenian: Ֆիլիպ, French: Philippe; died 1225), also called Philip of Tripoli, was king of the Armenian Kingdom of Cilicia from 1222 to 1225 as the first husband and co-ruler of Queen Isabella. He was a member of the House of Poitiers.

== Marriage negotiations ==
A member of the House of Poitiers, Philip was one of the younger sons of Bohemond IV, a Norman who ruled the Principality of Antioch and the County of Tripoli, and his first wife, Plaisance of Gibelet from the Embriaco family.

Raymond-Roupen, Philip's first cousin who had waged the War of the Antiochene Succession with Philip's father for many years, also claimed the throne of Cilicia as the former heir designate of King Leo I. Upon his defeat and imprisonment by Constantine of Baberon, regent on behalf of Leo's daughter Isabella, the Armenians wanted to renew their alliance with Antioch. They requested that Bohemond IV send a husband to their young queen, and Bohemond offered Philip. Since Philip was Bohemond's fourth son, who could not be expected to inherit Antioch, the Armenians accepted. They made the union conditional upon Philip joining the Armenian Apostolic Church, to which Bohemond agreed.

== Reign ==
Philip's marriage to Isabella was celebrated in June 1222. Before his coronation as king, Philip swore to uphold the rites of the Armenian Apostolic Church and Armenian customs.

Philip's victory over the attacking Seljuk Turks made a good initial impression upon his subjects. Their hopes that Philip would become a good Armenian, however, were frustrated, as he had "incorrigibly Latin tastes". Philip spent as much time as he could in Antioch, showed favoritism towards his French advisors, and refused to adhere to Armenian Apostolic rites. This instigated a revolt by the Armenians. In late 1224, Philip was arrested during a night journey to Antioch. He was accused of stealing the crown jewels of Cilicia and sending them to Antioch. He spent months imprisoned in the fortress of Partzerpert near Sis, the Cilician capital, while his father appealed to Constantine. The negotiations were in vain, and Philip was poisoned in prison in 1225. Bohemond planned to avenge his son's death, but was prevented when his allies, the Ayyubids, switched to the side of the Armenians.

== Notes ==
Philip of Antioch House of Poitiers Born: 1198 Died: 1225
Regnal titles
Preceded by Isabella as sole monarch	King of Armenian Cilicia; 1222–1225 with Isabella	Succeeded by Isabella as sole monarch
