= Orgueilleuse of Harenc =

- Spouse: Bohemond III of Antioch
- Issue: Raymond IV, Count of Tripoli; Bohemond IV of Antioch

Orgueilleuse of Harenc, also known as Orgillosa (died after January 1175), was Princess of Antioch—a Crusader state in the Middle East—from the 1160s to her death. She was the first wife of Prince Bohemond III, but most details of her life are uncertain. According to the historian Andrew D. Buck, she was a scion of the aristocratic Fresnel family. She gave birth to two sons, Raymond and Bohemond.

== Life ==
The Crusader states, c. 1165

The main source of her life is the Lignages d'Outremer, a monograph about the royal and aristocratic families of the Crusader states and Cilician Armenia compiled c. 1270. She is mentioned in princely charters between 1170 and 1175. Both her parentage and the circumstances of her marriage to Bohemond are unclear. The historian Andrew D. Buck presents her as the heiress of Harenc (now at Harem, Syria), a strategically important fortress defending the frontiers of the Principality of Antioch against attacks from the Muslim emirate of Aleppo.

Orgueilleuse became the first wife of Bohemond III of Antioch in the 1160s, according to Buck. He argues that she must have "come from a family deeply entrenched within Antioch's political history" to be married by the ruling prince. Consequently, he identifies her as a scion of the noble Fresnel family established by the Norman aristocrat Guy Fresnel who had seized Harenc c. 1111. Harenc, with Buck's words, "had a turbulent history", as it had been captured and recaptured by Antiochene and Aleppan troops many times before it was definitely lost to Antioch in 1164, although Bohemond would try to reconquer it several times during the 1170s and 1180s.

Orgueilleuse gave birth to Bohemond's two sons, Raymond (in 1169) and the younger Bohemond (in 1171). Buck assumes that Bohemond's younger half-brother Baldwin left Antioch to join the Varangian Guard after their birth, because Bohemond wanted to secure his heir's smooth succession in case of his early death. The medievalist Malcolm Barber says that Orgueilleuse was last mentioned in February 1175, while an other historian, Guy Perry adds March 1175 as the final date.

== Sources ==
- Barber, Malcolm (2012). The Crusader States. Yale University Press. ISBN 978-0-300-11312-9.
- Buck, Andrew D. (2017). The Principality of Antioch and Its Frontiers in the Twelfth Century. The Boydell Press. ISBN 978-1-78327-173-3.
- Nielen, Marie-Adélaïde (2006). "Lignages d'Outremer". In Murray, Alan V. (ed.). K–Q. The Crusades: An Encyclopedia. Vol. III. ABC Clio. pp. 726–727. ISBN 978-1-57607-862-4.
- Perry, Guy (2013). John of Brienne: King of Jerusalem, Emperor of Constantinople, c. 1175–1237. Cambridge University Press. ISBN 978-1-107-04310-7.
- Runciman, Steven (1989) [1951]. The Kingdom of Jerusalem and the Frankish East, 1100–1187. A History of the Crusades. Vol. II. Cambridge University Press. ISBN 978-0-521-06162-9.
- Rüdt-Collenberg, Count W. H. (1963). The Rupenides, Hethumides and Lusignans: The Structure of the Armeno–Cilician Dynasties. Calouste Gulbenkian Foundation Library. OCLC 5122239.
