= Raymond-Roupen =

Prince of Antioch from 1216 to 1219

Raymond-Roupen Ռեյմոնդ-Ռուպեն
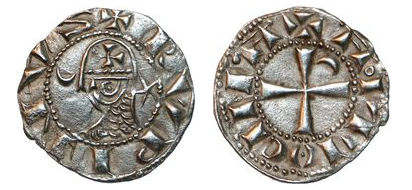
- Coin of Raymond-Roupen minted in Antioch around 1216 to 1219.

Prince of Antioch
- Reign: 1216–1219
- Rival: Bohemond IV

King of Armenian Cilicia
- Reign: 1211–1219
- Senior king: Leo I
- Born: 1198
- Died: 1221/1222
- Spouse: Helvis of Cyprus
- Issue more...: Maria, Lady of Toron
- House: House of Poitiers
- Father: Raymond IV, Count of Tripoli
- Mother: Alice, Lady of Toron

Raymond-Roupen (also Raymond-Rupen and Ruben-Raymond; 1198 – 1219 or 1221/1222) was a member of the House of Poitiers who claimed the thrones of the Principality of Antioch and Armenian Kingdom of Cilicia. His succession in Antioch was prevented by his paternal uncle Bohemond IV, but his maternal great-uncle Leo I of Cilicia recognized him as heir presumptive to Cilicia and pressed his claim to Antioch. In 1211 Raymond-Roupen was crowned junior king of Cilicia, and was finally installed as Prince of Antioch in 1216. The War of the Antiochene Succession ended with Leo's death in 1219, shortly before Raymond-Roupen was ousted from Antioch. He then pursued his claim to Cilicia, which Leo had unexpectedly willed to his daughter Isabella on his deathbed, but was defeated and imprisoned until death.

== Succession uncertainty ==
The marriage of Raymond-Roupen's parents, Raymond of Antioch and Alice of Armenia, was arranged in 1195 to end the hostilities between the Armenian Kingdom of Cilicia and the Latin Principality of Antioch and to eventually unite them under one ruler. The idea failed when Raymond died in early 1197, leaving Alice pregnant. She gave birth to a posthumous son, Raymond-Roupen. The infant was heir apparent to his grandfather Bohemond III of Antioch by primogeniture, but this principle was not upheld in the Latin East. Instead, the fiefs passed by the proximity of blood, which favored Bohemond III's surviving children. Raymond-Roupen's grandfather was elderly and unlikely to live until Raymond-Roupen reached the age of majority, making an undesirable Armenian-dominated regency likely if Raymond-Roupen were to succeed him.

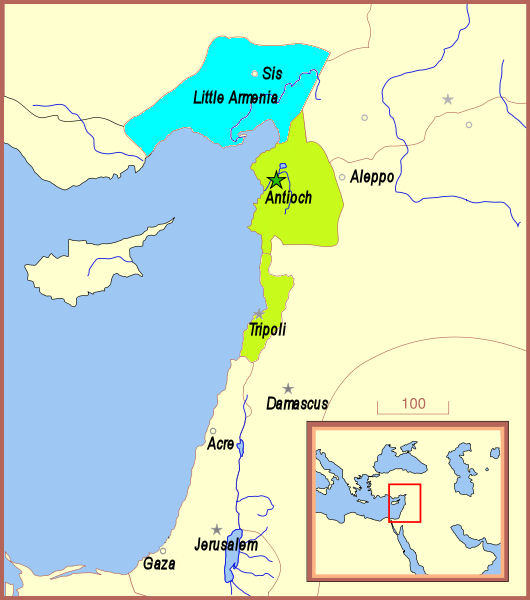
Cilicia (Little Armenia) and Antioch-Tripoli

Bohemond sent his widowed daughter-in-law back to Cilicia along with his newborn grandson, either to ensure their safety or to remove the grandson from succession in favor of a son by his latest marriage. The two arrived just in time for the coronation of Alice's uncle, Leo I, as the first king of Cilicia. The ceremony was combined with Raymond-Roupen's baptism, and both were performed by the papal legate Conrad of Wittelsbach. Leo, who had no sons, recognized Raymond-Roupen as his heir presumptive, and made it his principal mission to secure his grandnephew's succession to Antioch as well.

Conrad of Wittelsbach traveled from Sis to Antioch, where he compelled Bohemond III to summon his vassals and have Raymond-Roupen recognized as his heir apparent. Bohemond III's eldest surviving son, Bohemond, who was already ruling the County of Tripoli, immediately denounced the oaths of allegiance given to Raymond-Roupen. Having secured the support of the Knights Templar, the Knights Hospitaller, the Genoese and Pisan merchants, and the Commune of Antioch, Bohemond suddenly appeared in Antioch in late 1198, ejected his father and had the commune swear allegiance to himself as the future prince. The Antiochene clergy too abandoned Raymond-Roupen's cause after Leo fell out with Peter of Angoulême, Latin Patriarch of Antioch.

== War of the Antiochene Succession ==
When Bohemond III died in April 1201, Bohemond IV had no difficulty establishing himself as Prince of Antioch. Many noblemen who had favored Raymond-Roupen fled to Sis. Leo laid siege to the city of Antioch, starting the War of the Antiochene Succession. Amalric, King of Jerusalem and Cyprus, favored Raymond-Roupen but declined to intervene. Leo arranged for Raymond-Roupen to marry Helvis, Amalric's daughter and sister of King Hugh I of Cyprus, in 1210. On 15 August 1211, Raymond-Roupen was crowned as junior king of Cilicia, with a crown sent by Emperor Otto IV. The following year, when he was about to reach the age of majority, Raymond-Roupen was sent by Leo to plunder Antioch.

Raymond-Roupen found new allies in the Hospitallers and Antiochene noblemen, including the leader of the commune, by promising grants of land. In this too he was supported by Leo. In early 1216, Antioch was finally occupied. Raymond-Roupen and Leo entered the city on 14 February, while Bohemond was absent. Raymond-Roupen was consecrated as Prince of Antioch by the Latin Patriarch, Peter of Ivrea, and received the submission of the nobility and the commune. The Seljuk Turks promptly attacked Cilicia, and Raymond-Roupen may have been asked to assist his granduncle. Their relationship, however, deteriorated and Raymond-Roupen intended to capture Leo. The latter was warned by the Templars and escaped to Cilicia. Without Leo's backing, Raymond-Roupen could not hold Antioch. He helped the Hospitallers occupy Jableh in 1218 but found himself lacking resources, as the principality had been devastated by the war. An increase of taxation made him unpopular among his subjects.

In 1219, the burghers and noblemen of Antioch rose up and persuaded Bohemond to return. On his uncle's arrival, Raymond-Roupen sought refuge in the citadel but then fled to Cilicia. He left the citadel in the hands of the Hospitallers, earning their friendship.

== Cilician claim ==
Once ousted from Antioch, Raymond-Roupen sought shelter with Leo in Cilicia. His granduncle was on his deathbed, however, and decided to disinherit Raymond-Roupen in favor of his infant daughter Isabella. Prince Bohemond IV's restoration, followed by King Leo I's death in May 1219, thus ended Raymond-Roupen's prospects of ruling Antioch. Raymond-Roupen instead rose to claim Cilicia, as did John of Brienne, husband of Leo's elder daughter, Stephanie. Pope Honorius III ruled that Stephanie or her son by John should succeed King Leo, but both mother and child died soon after. Honorius then ruled in favor of Raymond-Roupen.

Raymond-Roupen's chances of winning the Cilician throne seemed good: he had the support of his mother, Alice; of some Cilician nobles; of the Hospitallers; of the papacy and of the papal legate Pelagius of Albano, who was leading the Fifth Crusade in Egypt. Raymond-Roupen traveled to Damietta in the summer of 1220 to consult with Pelagius in person, after which he invaded Cilicia with his mother. They established themselves in Tarsus, where they waited for help from the Hospitallers. Constantine of Baberon, regent for Queen Isabella, quickly marched to their stronghold. After a three-month siege, Tarsus was captured together with Raymond-Roupen and Alice.

== Aftermath ==
Raymond-Roupen died in a Cilician prison in 1221 or 1222. He was in his mid-twenties. Isabella and Bohemond were left to reign uncontested in Cilicia and Antioch, respectively, and shortly thereafter Bohemond's son Philip became king by marrying Isabella, but met a similar fate. Honorius and Pelagius decided not to put forward the claims of Raymond-Roupen's young daughters, Maria and Eschiva, who were taken by their mother to Cyprus.

== Family tree ==
Leo I of Armenia	Roupen III of Armenia	Bohemond III of Antioch
John of Brienne	Stephanie of Armenia	Isabella of Armenia	Alice of Armenia	Raymond IV of Tripoli	Bohemond IV of Antioch
Raymond-Roupen

== Sources ==
- Boase, T. S. R. (1978). The Cilician Kingdom of Armenia. Edinburgh: Scottish Academic Press. ISBN 0-7073-0145-9.
- Hardwicke, Mary Nickerson (1969). "The Crusader States, 1192–1243". In Setton, Kenneth M.; Wolff, Robert Lee; Hazard, Harry (eds.). A History of the Crusades, Volume II: The Later Crusades, 1189–1311. The University of Wisconsin Press. pp. 522–554. ISBN 0-299-04844-6.
- Burgtorf, Jochen (2016). "The Antiochene war of succession". In Boas, Adrian J. (ed.). The Crusader World. University of Wisconsin Press. pp. 196–211. ISBN 978-0-415-82494-1.
- Jotischky, Andrew (2016). Kedar, Benjamin Z.; Phillips, Jonathan; Riley-Smith, Jonathan (eds.). Crusades. Vol. 7. Taylor & Francis. ISBN 978-1-351-98557-4.
- Runciman, Steven (1989). A History of the Crusades, Volume III: The Kingdom of Acre and the Later Crusades. Cambridge University Press. ISBN 0-521-06163-6.
- Stopka, Krzysztof (2016). Armenia Christiana: Armenian Religious Identity and the Churches of Constantinople and Rome (4th-15th century). Kraków: Jagiellonian University Press. ISBN 9788323395553.

Raymond-Roupen House of Poitiers Born: 1198 Died: 1221/1222
Regnal titles
Preceded by Bohemond IV	Prince of Antioch; 1216–1219	Succeeded by Bohemond IV
Preceded by Leo I as sole king	King of Armenian Cilicia; 1211–1219 with Leo I as senior king	Succeeded by Isabella
