= Prince of Antioch =

Ruling monarch of the Principality of Antioch (1098–1268)

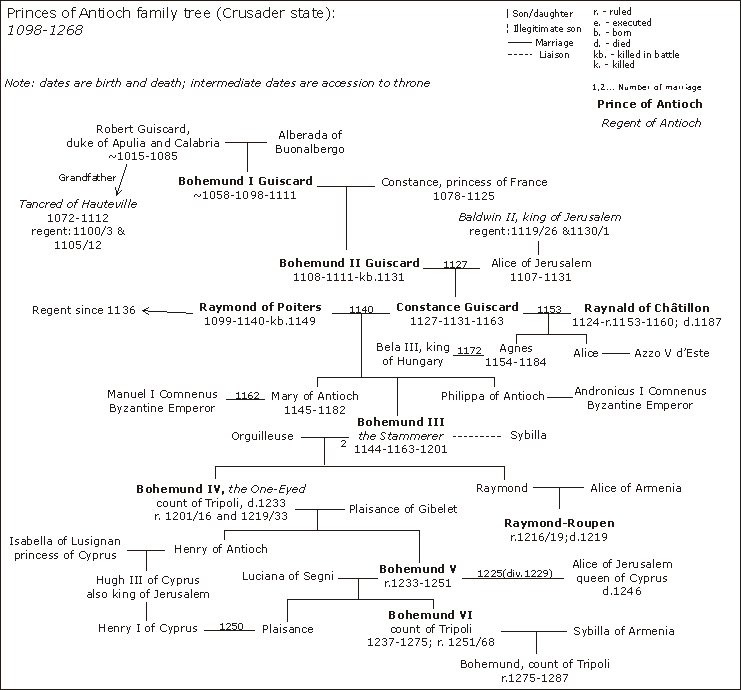
Family tree of the Princes of Antioch

Prince of Antioch (Latin: princeps Antiochenus) was the title given during the Middle Ages to Norman rulers of the Principality of Antioch, a region surrounding the city of Antioch (modern Antakya, Turkey). The Princes originally came from the County of Sicily. Prince Bohemond IV of Antioch additionally came into possession of the County of Tripoli, combining these two Crusader states for the rest of their histories.

Bohemond I claimed Antioch under contentious circumstances during the First Crusade after previously pledging to return former Byzantine lands to Alexios I Komnenos. Bohemond began issuing documents calling himself the prince of Antioch circa 1106, after his return from the crusade.

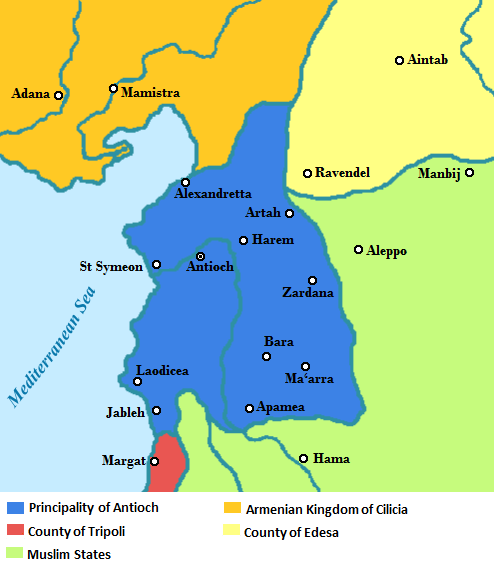
The Principality of Antioch, 1135

Antioch had been the chief city of the region since the time of the Roman Empire. When the Mamluk Sultanate of Egypt drove out the knights in 1268, they largely destroyed the city to deny access to the region in case the Crusaders returned.

== Rulers of Antioch, 1098–1268 ==
Prince, reign	Birth	Marriage(s)	Death
Bohemond I 1098–1111	c. 1058; San Marco Argentano, Calabria son of Robert Guiscard, Duke of Apulia and Calabria & Alberada of Buonalbergo	Constance of France; 25 March-26 May 1106 two sons	3 March 1111; Bari, Apulia aged about 53
Tancred, Prince of Galilee acted as regent 1100–1103 and 1104–1112.
Bohemond II; 1111–1130	1108; Apulia son of Prince Bohemond I and Constance of France	Alice of Jerusalem; 1126 one daughter	February 1130; Mamistra, Cilicia aged about 22
Roger of Salerno acted as regent 1112–1119; King Baldwin II of Jerusalem acted as regent 1119–1126 and 1130–1131.
Constance; 1130–1163 with Raymond 1136–1149 with Raynald 1153–1160	1127 daughter of Prince Bohemond II and Agnes of Jerusalem	Raymond of Poitiers; 1136 three children Raynald of Châtillon; 1153 one daughter	1163 aged about 36
Fulk, King of Jerusalem acted as regent 1131–1136.
Raymond; 1136–1149 with Constance	c. 1115; Poitiers, Aquitaine son of William IX, Duke of Aquitaine and Philippa of Toulouse	Constance, Princess of Antioch; 1136 three children	29 June 1149; Inab, Syria aged about 34
Raynald; 1153–1160 with Constance	c. 1125	Constance, Princess of Antioch; 1153 one daughter Stephanie, Lady of Oultrejordain; 1175 two children	4 July 1187; Hittin, Kingdom of Jerusalem aged about 62
Bohemond III; 1163–1201	1144 son of Prince Raymond and Princess Constance	Orguilleuse d'Harenc c. 1169 two sons Theodora Komnene c. 1176 two children Sibylle c. 1181 two children Isabella c. 1199 one son	1201 aged about 57
Bohemond III's eldest son Raymond IV, Count of Tripoli acted as regent 1193–1194.
Bohemond IV; 1201–1216; 1219–1233	c. 1172 son of Prince Bohemond III and Orguilleuse d'Harenc	Plaisance Embracio de Giblet bef. 21 August 1198 six children Melisende of Jerusalem; January 1218 three daughters	March 1233 aged about 61
Raymond-Roupen; 1216–1219	1199 son of Raymond IV, Count of Tripoli and Alice of Armenia	Helvis of Cyprus c. 1210 two daughters	c. 1221; Armenia aged about 22
Bohemond V 1233–1252	1199 son of Prince Bohemond IV and Plaisance Embracio de Giblet	Alice of Champagne; July 1225 no children Luciana di Segni; 1235 two children	January 1252; Antioch aged about 53
Bohemond VI; 1252–1268	c. 1237 son of Prince Bohemond V and Luciana di Segni	Sibylla of Armenia; 1254 four children	1275 aged about 38

== Titular rulers of Antioch 1268–1457 ==
Titular Prince, reign	Birth	Marriage(s)	Death
Bohemond VI; 1268–1275	c. 1237 son of Prince Bohemond V and Luciana di Segni	Sibylla of Armenia; 1254 four children	1275 aged about 38
Bohemond VII; 1275–1287	1261 son of Prince Bohemond VI and Sibylla of Armenia	Margaret of Acre no children	19 October 1287 aged about 26
Lucia; 1287–c. 1299	daughter of Prince Bohemond VI and Sibylla of Armenia	Narjot de Toucy c. 1278 one son	after 1292
Philippe II c.1299–1300	after 1278; Auxerre son of Narjot de Toucy and Princess Lucia	Eleanor of Naples; 1299 no children	1300
Here the empty title passes to the Kings of Cyprus and Jerusalem.
Margaret; 1300–1308	c. 1244 daughter of Henry of Antioch and Isabella of Cyprus	Jean de Montfort; 22 September 1268 no children	1308 aged about 74
John I (of Lusignan) bef. 1364–1375	c. 1329 son of Hugh IV, King of Cyprus, and Alix of Ibelin	Constance of Sicily; 1343 no children Alice of Ibelin; 1350 one son	1375 aged about 46
John II bef. 1432–1432	16 May 1418 son of Janus, King of Cyprus, and Charlotte of Bourbon	Amadea Palaiologina of Montferrat; 3 July 1440 no children Helena Palaiologina; 3 February 1442 two daughters	28 July 1458 aged 40
John III (of Coimbra) c. 1456–1457	1431 son of Infante Peter, Duke of Coimbra and Isabella of Urgell	Charlotte of Cyprus; 1456 no children	1457; Nicosia, Kingdom of Cyprus aged about 26

== Vassals of Antioch ==
=== Lords of Saône ===
The Lordship of Saône was centered on the castle of Saône, but included the towns of Sarmada (lost in 1134) and Balatanos. Saône was captured by Saladin from the last lord, Matthew, in 1188.

- Robert "the Leprous" (d. 1119)
- William (1119–1132)
- Matthew (1132-1188)

== Great Officers of Antioch ==
Like Jerusalem, Antioch had its share of great officers, including Constable, Marshal, Seneschal, Duc, Vicomte, Butler, Chamberlain, and Chancellor.
