= Commune of Antioch =

The Commune of Antioch was a medieval commune in the Principality of Antioch. It was formed in 1194 in the courthouse of the Church of Saint Peter by a congregation of citizens headed by the Latin patriarch, Radulph II. The prince, Bohemond III, was at the time imprisoned by Leo II of Armenia, and the citizens had driven out the Armenians who came to occupy the city. The commune, with its elected members, took over the administration. To legalize their position, they quickly paid homage to Bohemond III's eldest son and regent, Raymond, who gave them a formal recognition.

Despite the Latin Church's sympathy for the commune, it is more likely that the idea came from the Genoese and Pisan merchants, who were anxious about the future of their trade under an Armenian domination; the Italians were much more familiar with communes than the French in any case. It was the Greeks, however, who soon took a leading role.

== Sources ==
Runciman, Steven (1989). A History of the Crusades, Volume III: The Kingdom of Acre and the Later Crusades. Cambridge University Press. pp. 88–89. ISBN 0-521-06163-6.
