= Plaisance of Gibelet =

Princess of Antioch, died 1217

- Died: 1217
- Spouse: Bohemond IV of Antioch
- Issue: Raymond of Antioch; Bohemond V of Antioch; Philip of Antioch; Henry of Antioch
- House: Embriaco
- Father: Hugh III Embriaco
- Mother: Stephanie of Milly

Plaisance of Gibelet (died 1217) was the daughter of Hugh III Embriaco, Lord of Gibelet, and Stephanie of Milly.

She married Bohemond IV of Antioch, and they had several children including:

- Raymond, (1195−1213), died in Tartus
- Bohemond V (died 1252), Prince of Antioch
- Philip (died 1226), Armenian King of Cilicia
- Henry (died 1272), ancestor of the Kings of Cyprus

== Sources ==
- Burgtorf, Jochen (2016). The Antiochene War of Succession. The University of Wisconsin Press. ISBN 978-0-415-82494-1.
- Runciman, Steven (1989). A History of the Crusades, Volume III: The Kingdom of Acre and the Later Crusades. Cambridge University Press. ISBN 0-521-06163-6.
