= Bohemond IV of Antioch =

Prince of Antioch (1201–1216, 1219–1233)

Bohemond IV
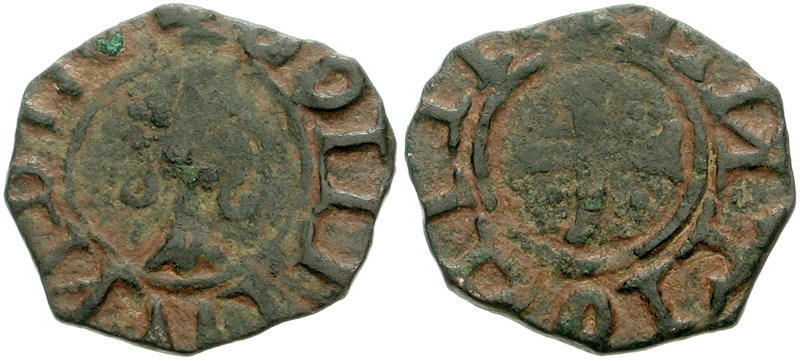

Prince of Antioch
- Reign: 1201–1216; 1219–1233
- Predecessor: Bohemond III; Raymond-Roupen
- Successor: Raymond-Roupen; Bohemond V

Count of Tripoli
- Reign: 1187–1233
- Predecessor: Raymond IV
- Successor: Bohemond V
- Born: c. 1175
- Died: March 1233 (aged 57–58)
- Spouse: Plaisance Embriaco; Melisende of Lusignan
- Issue: Raymond; Bohemond V Philip; Henry; Maria
- House: House of Poitiers
- Father: Bohemond III of Antioch
- Mother: Orgueilleuse of Harenc
- Religion: Catholicism

Bohemond IV, also known as Bohemond the One-Eyed (French: Bohémond le Borgne; c. 1175 – 1233), was Count of Tripoli from 1187 to 1233, and Prince of Antioch from 1201 to 1216 and from 1219 to 1233. He was the younger son of Bohemond III of Antioch. The dying Raymond III of Tripoli offered his county to Bohemond's elder brother, Raymond, but their father sent Bohemond to Tripoli in late 1187. Saladin, the Ayyubid sultan of Egypt and Syria, conquered the county, save for the capital and two fortresses, in summer 1188.

Raymond died in early 1197, leaving a posthumous son, Raymond-Roupen. Raymond-Roupen's mother, Alice, was the niece of Leo I of Cilicia who persuaded the Antiochene noblemen to acknowledge Raymond-Roupen's right to succeed his grandfather. However, the Latin and Greek burghers proclaimed Bohemond heir to his father. After his father died in April 1201, Bohemond seized Antioch with the support of the burghers, the Knights Templar and Hospitallers, and the Italian merchants.

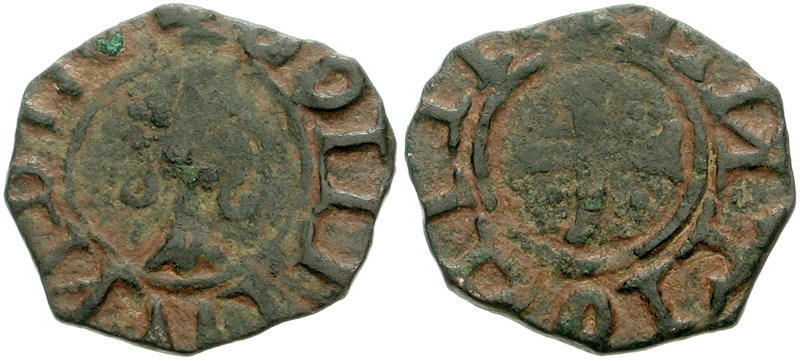

Bohemond made an alliance with Az-Zahir Ghazi, the Ayyubid emir of Aleppo, and Kaykaus I, the Seljuq sultan of Rum, who often invaded Cilicia during the following years, to prevent Leo I from attacking Antioch. Conflicts between Bohemond and the Latin patriarchs of Antioch enabled Raymond-Roupen to seize Antioch in 1216, but Bohemond regained the principality in 1219. After Leo I's death, Bohemond tried to secure Cilicia to his younger son, Philip, but Constantine of Baberon, who had administered Cilicia during the previous years, imprisoned Philip in 1224. Bohemond allied with Kayqubad I, sultan of Rum, but he could not prevent Philip's murder in 1225.

== Early life ==
Bohemond was the younger son of Bohemond III of Antioch by his first wife, Orgueilleuse of Harenc. He was born around 1175. His mother was last mentioned in a charter issued in 1175. Bohemond's widowed father married a relative of the Byzantine Emperor Manuel I Komnenos, Theodora, but he repudiated her shortly after Manuel's death in 1180. He married Sybil, an Antiochene noblewoman, described as a prostitute or sorcerer by 12th-century authors. She was a spy of Saladin, the Ayyubid sultan of Egypt and Syria. Aimery of Limoges, Latin Patriarch of Antioch, excommunicated Bohemond's father for his third marriage.

== Reign ==
=== Count of Tripoli ===
The crusader states around 1190

The childless Raymond III of Tripoli decided to bequeath his county to his godson, Raymond, who was Bohemond's elder brother. Bohemond III of Antioch sent Bohemond to Tripoli, because the union of Antioch and Tripoli under one monarch could jeopardize the defence of both crusader states. Raymond III of Tripoli ordered his vassals to do homage to Bohemond. The dying count, who was a member of the House of Toulouse, also prescribed that should another member of his family come from Toulouse, Bohemond should cede the County of Tripoli to him. Raymond died in late 1187. Charters issued during the first years of Bohemond's rule imply that his elder brother was regarded a titular count of Tripoli for a while.

After Saladin conquered almost the whole Kingdom of Jerusalem in the second half of 1187, Queen Sibylla sought shelter in Tripoli, which became a center of her supporters. The noblemen who condemned her husband, Guy of Lusignan, for the fall of the kingdom, joined Conrad of Montferrat at Tyros. Saladin decided to invade the crusader states in Syria. He started his military campaign against Tripoli in May 1188, but the arrival of the fleet of William II of Sicily saved the town. After Saladin captured Tortosa and Jabala (present-day Tartus and Jableh in Syria) in July, only Tripoli, Krak des Chevaliers, and the citadel at Tortosa remained under Christian rule in the county.

Saladin released Guy of Lusignan who joined his wife. Guy, Sybilla, and their supporters left Tripoli and laid siege to Acre in August 1189. The siege was the first sign of a new Christian offensive. Richard I of England could not reoccupy Jerusalem during the Third Crusade, but he ensured the survival of the Kingdom of Jerusalem before leaving the Holy Land on 9 October 1192. Taking advantage of the crusade, Bohemond's father made a ten-year truce with Saladin on 30 October 1192. The truce covered both Antioch and Tripoli.

Bohemond's stepmother, Sybil, wanted to secure the succession of Antioch to her son, William. Leo, Lord of Armenian Cilicia exploited her ambitions. With her assistance, he captured and imprisoned Bohemond III in early 1194. Leo also forced Bohemond III to surrender Antioch to him, but the Latin and Greek burghers formed a commune and prevented the Armenian soldiers from seizing the town. The commune proclaimed Bohemond III's elder son, Raymond, regent. Bohemond hurried from Tripoli to Antioch at the head of his army to help his brother, compelling the Armenian troops to return to Cilicia. Leo released their father only after Bohemond III renounced his claim to suzerainty over Cilicia.

Raymond died in early 1197. His widow, Alice, was Leo of Cilicia's niece and heir. Bohemond III sent Alice and her posthumous son, Raymond-Roupen, to Leo, implying that he wanted to disinherit his grandson. Leo of Cilicia persuaded the papal legate, Conrad of Wittelsbach, Archbishop of Mainz, to visit Antioch. On the archbishop's demand, Bohemond III declared Raymond-Roupen his heir and ordered the Antiochene noblemen to swear fealty to the boy. Raymond-Roupen was the only son of the first-born son of Bohemond III and thus heir by primogeniture, but Bohemond was Bohemond III's closest male relative and so heir by proximity of blood.

In early 1198, Bohemond marched to Antioch and gained the support of the military orders and the Italian merchants, promising new grants to them. The commune also acknowledged his claim to rule, because the burghers feared that the Armenians' influence would increase if Raymond-Roupen succeeded his grandfather. Bohemond returned to Tripoli shortly after his claim was confirmed, because Leo of Cilicia broke into the principality to restore Bohemond III. Bohemond styled himself "son of Prince Bohemond of Antioch and by the grace of God count of Tripoli" to emphasize his right to inherit Antioch.

=== War of Succession ===
Coat of arms of Poitiers of Antioch

Bohemond hurried to Antioch when his father died in April 1201. The commune confirmed his right to rule. The military orders also supported him, but the noblemen who remained loyal to Raymond-Roupen fled to Cilicia. Leo of Cilicia besieged Antioch to assert Raymond-Roupen's claim. Bohemond made an alliance with Az-Zahir Ghazi, the Ayyubid emir of Aleppo, and Kaykaus I, the Seljuq sultan of Rum, who forced the Armenian troops to return to Cilicia.

Leo tried to gain the support of the Holy See against Bohemond, promising to unite the Armenian Church with Rome. Pope Innocent III sent Cardinal Soffred Gaetani to Antioch in late spring 1203. Bohemond declined to meet the papal legate, stating that the patriarchs of Antioch and Jerusalem had excommunicated him for his debate with the Hospitallers. Gaetani mediated a reconciliation between Bohemond and the Hospitallers, but Bohemond insisted that the papal legate could not be mentioned in the agreement, because the Holy See could not make a judgement about feudal rights in the principality.

In 1203, Renoart of Nephin, Bohemond's vassal, married Isabel the heiress of Gibelcar, without his authorization. The High Court of Tripoli ordered the confiscation of Renoart's fiefs. However, he decided to resist and gained the support of Leo and Aimery, the king of Cyprus and Jerusalem. Bohemond traveled to Acre in summer 1204 to meet Marie of Champagne. Her husband, Baldwin I, had been recently crowned emperor in Constantinople. He did homage to her, acknowledging the suzerainty of the Latin emperors over Antioch. Marie tried to mediate a reconciliation between Bohemond and Leo of Cilicia, but she died in August.

Renoart of Nephin pillaged the countryside and led his troops to Tripoli in late 1204. Bohemond lost an eye in a battle at the gates of the town. He could only crush the rebellion after Aimery died in April 1205. He captured both Nephin and Gibelcar before the end of the year, forcing Renart to flee to Cyprus. Before long, Bohemond returned to Antioch.

Bohemond had already been on bad terms with the Latin patriarch of Antioch, Peter of Angoulême. Taking advantage of a conflict between the patriarch and the papal legate, Peter Capuano, Bohemond restored the Eastern Orthodox patriarch of Antioch, Symeon II, in early 1206 or 1207. Peter of Angoulême and the papal legate were reconciled and the patriarch excommunicated Bohemond, Symeon and the commune with the approval of the Holy See. He also imposed an interdict on Antioch, but the burghers ignored his decision and visited the Greek churches.

Peter of Angoulême helped Raymond-Roupen's supporters to return from Cilicia to Antioch in late 1207. Surprised by the coup, Bohemond sought refuge in the citadel. Although Leo of Cilicia also entered the town, Bohemond was able to muster his troops and defeat his enemies. He captured and imprisoned the Latin patriarch who refused to acknowledge him as the lawful prince. After Peter of Angoulême died of thirst, Pope Innocent III ordered Albert Avogadro, the Latin patriarch of Jerusalem, to excommunicate Bohemond. Bohemond continued to support the Eastern Orthodox patriarch and did not allow Peter of Ivrea, the new Latin patriarch of Antioch, to visit his see. He also debated the right of the Holy See to make a judgement about the succession in Antioch, stating that the principality was a fief of the Latin emperors of Constantinople.

The Hospitallers made raids against Hama, Homs and Latakia from their castles in Bohemond's realms. Al-Adil I, the Ayyubid ruler of Damascus and Egypt, blamed Bohemond for the knights' actions. Al-Adil broke into the County of Tripoli, forcing Bohemond to pay a compensation in 1208 or 1209.

Az-Zahir Ghazi invaded Cilicia to prevent Leo from attacking Antioch in 1209. Cilician soldiers who tried to seize a caravan wounded the grand master of the Knights Templar Guillaume de Chartres, in a skirmish on the plains near Antioch in 1211. Their action annoyed Pope Innocent who excommunicated Leo of Cilicia. Bohemond expelled the Eastern Orthodox patriarch from Antioch, allowing Peter of Ivrea to take charge of his see. John of Brienne, King of Jerusalem, sent reinforcements to Antioch to fight against the Armenians. Leo dispatched Raymond-Roupen to attack the Templars' domains in Bohemond's principality in 1212.

A group of Assassins murdered Bohemond's eldest son, Raymond, in 1213. At the time, the Assassins were tributaries to the Hospitallers and Bohemond suspected the Hospitallers had been involved in the murder. After Bohemond and the Templars laid siege their fortress at Khawabi, the Assassins sought assistance from Bohemond's old ally, Az-Zahir Ghazi. Az-Zahir Ghazi appealed to Al-Adil, although they had been enemies. Their alliance forced Bohemond to lift the siege and to send an apology to Az-Zahir Ghazi.

Bohemond preferred to stay in Tripoli which caused discontent among the citizens of Antioch. Peter of Ivrea, the Hospitallers and Acharie of Sermin, who was the senechal of Antioch and head of the commune, started negotiations with Leo of Cilicia about the surrender of Antioch to Raymond-Roupen. They helped the Cilician troops to enter Antioch on 14 February 1216. The Templars abandoned the citadel without resistance and Raymond-Roupen was installed as prince.

Duke Leopold VI of Austria, who landed at Acre in late summer 1217, invited Bohemond to join the Fifth Crusade. Bohemond and his vassals marched to Acre. However, the crusade ended in failure because of the lack of a united command. Bohemond left the Kingdom of Jerusalem together with Andrew II of Hungary and Hugh I of Cyprus in January 1218. Andrew attended at the wedding of Bohemond and Hugh's half-sister Melisende in Tripoli. During the same year, Moslem troops made a plundering raid against the County of Tripoli.

=== Conflicts ===
In 1219, a group of Antiochene noblemen rose up against Raymond-Roupen who had lost Leo of Cilicia's support. Their leader, William Farabel, urged Bohemond to come to Antioch. Raymond-Roupen sought refuge in the citadel, but he was forced to leave Antioch. He entrusted the citadel to the Hospitallers. Bohemond hurried to Antioch and seized the principality. The Hospitallers abandoned the citadel without resistance.

Before long, Bohemond granted Jabala (which was still to be conquered) to the Templars although Raymond-Roupen had promised the town to the Hospitallers. The papal legate, Cardinal Pelagius, brokered an agreement between the military orders, dividing the town between them. However, Bohemond remained hostile to the Hospitallers. After he confiscated their property in Antioch, Pelagius excommunicated him.

Constantine of Baberon, the regent for Queen Isabella of Cilicia, offered her hand to Bohemond's son, Philip, because he needed Bohemond's assistance against Kayqubad I, Sultan of Rum. Bohemond accepted the offer and his son married Isabella in June 1222. Bohemond and Philip repelled a Seldjuq attack against Cilicia. Philip's blatant favoritism towards his Frankish retainers enabled Constantine of Baberon to hatch a plot against him. Philip and his supporters were captured and imprisoned at the end of 1224. Bohemond tried to ensure his son's liberation through negotiations. He appealed to Pope Honorius III, but the pope confirmed his excommunication and forbade the Templars to assist him. Bohemond persuaded Kayqubad I to invade Cilicia. Although Bohemond's son had already been poisoned, Constantine of Baberon promised that Philip would be released if Bohemond come to Cilicia. Shortly after Bohemond's departure, Shihab ad-Din Toghrul, atabeg of Aleppo, broke into the Principality of Antioch. After learning of his son's death and Toghrul's invasion, Bohemond hurried back.

The Holy Roman Emperor, Frederick II, summoned the Christian rulers of Syria and the Holy Land to Cyprus. Bohemond joined him while Frederick was marching from Limassol to Nicosia in August 1228. Frederick demanded an oath of fealty for Antioch and Tripoli from Bohemond, but Bohemond feigned a nervous breakdown and returned to Nephin. Bohemond again met Frederick in Acre in 1229, but Bohemond's realms were not included in the peace treaty between Frederick and Al-Kamil, sultan of Egypt, on 18 February 1229.

At the Hospitallers' request, Pope Gregory IX repeated the excommunication of Bohemond in March 1230. He authorized Gerald of Lausanne, Patriarch of Jerusalem, to lift the ban if Bohemond agreed to make peace with the Hospitallers. With the mediation of Gerald and the Ibelins, Bohemond and the Hospitallers made a treaty which was signed on 26 October 1231. Bohemond confirmed the Hospitallers' right to hold Jabala and a nearby fortress and granted them money fiefs in both Tripoli and Antioch. The knights renounced the privileges that Raymond-Roupen had granted to them. Before long, Gerald of Lausanne lifted the excommunication and sent the treaty to Rome to be confirmed by the Holy See.

John of Ibelin, who was the leader of Emperor Frederick's opponents in the kingdoms of Jerusalem and Cyprus, tried to convince Bohemond to support their cause. John sent his son, Balian, to Tripoli to negotiate with Bohemond, but the elderly Bohemond remained neutral in the conflict. Bohemond died in March 1233, a few weeks before the pope's confirmation of his treaty with the Hospitallers came to Tripoli. He was regarded as a great jurist by his contemporaries.

== Family ==
Bohemond's family (selective chart)

Raymond of Poitiers	Constance of Antioch	Raynald of Châtillon
Orgueilleuse	Bohemond III of Antioch	Sybil	Philippa	Maria	Baldwin	Agnes
Raymond IV of Tripoli	Bohemond IV of Antioch	William	Alice	Alexios II Komnenos	Andrew II of Hungary
Raymond-Roupen	Raymond	Bohemond V of Antioch	Philip	Henry	Maria
Bohemond VI of Antioch	Hugh III of Cyprus

Bohemond's first wife, Plaisance, was the daughter of Hugh III Embriaco, Lord of Jabala, and Stephanie of Milly. The marriage secured Bohemond's position in the County of Tripoli. Raymond, the eldest son of Bohemond and Plaisance, was murdered at the Cathedral of Our Lady of Tortosa in 1213 at the age of 18. Bohemond was succeeded by his second son, Bohemond, in both Antioch and Tripoli. Bohemond's and Plaisance's third son, Philip, who was the first husband of Isabella of Cilicia, ruled the Armenian Kingdom of Cilicia between 1222 and 1224. He died in prison. Bohemond's youngest son, Henry, married Isabella of Cyprus; their son, Hugh, inherited Cyprus in 1267 and the Kingdom of Jerusalem in 1268.

Bohemond's second wife, Melisende, was the youngest daughter of King Aimery of Cyprus and Queen Isabella I of Jerusalem. Their daughter, Maria, laid claim to the Kingdom of Jerusalem against her nephew, Hugh, in 1268. She died after 1307.

== Sources ==
- Barber, Malcolm (2012). The Crusader States. Yale University Press. ISBN 978-0-300-11312-9.
- Burgtorf, Jochen (2016). "The Antiochene war of succession". In Boas, Adrian J. (ed.). The Crusader World. The University of Wisconsin Press. pp. 196–211. ISBN 978-0-415-82494-1.
- Der Nersessian, Sirarpie (1969). "The Kingdom of Cilician Armenia". In Setton, Kenneth M.; Wolff, Robert Lee; Hazard, Harry (eds.). A History of the Crusades, Volume II: The Later Crusades, 1189–1311. The University of Wisconsin Press. pp. 630–659. ISBN 0-299-04844-6.
- Hardwicke, Mary Nickerson (1969). "The Crusader States, 1192–1243". In Setton, Kenneth M.; Wolff, Robert Lee; Hazard, Harry (eds.). A History of the Crusades, Volume II: The Later Crusades, 1189–1311. The University of Wisconsin Press. pp. 522–554. ISBN 0-299-04844-6.
- Lock, Peter (2006). The Routladge Companion to the Crusades. Routledge. ISBN 978-0-415-39312-6.
- Runciman, Steven (1989a). A History of the Crusades. Vol. II: The Kingdom of Jerusalem and the Frankish East, 1100–1187. Cambridge University Press. ISBN 0-521-06163-6.
- Runciman, Steven (1989b). A History of the Crusades. Vol. III: The Kingdom of Acre and the Later Crusades. Cambridge University Press. ISBN 0-521-06163-6.
- Van Cleve, Thomas C. (1969). "The Fifth Crusade". In Setton, Kenneth M.; Wolff, Robert Lee; Hazard, Harry (eds.). A History of the Crusades, Volume II: The Later Crusades, 1189–1311. The University of Wisconsin Press. pp. 377–428. ISBN 0-299-04844-6.
- Van Tricht, Filip (2011). The Latin Renovatio of Byzantium: The Empire of Constantinople (1204–1228). BRILL. ISBN 978-90-04-20323-5.

Bohemond IV of Antioch House of Poitiers Born: c. 1175 Died: March 1233
Regnal titles
Preceded by Raymond IV	Count of Tripoli; 1187–1233	Succeeded by Bohemond II
Preceded by Bohemond III	Prince of Antioch; 1201–1216	Succeeded by Raymond-Roupen
Preceded by Raymond-Roupen	Prince of Antioch; 1219–1233	Succeeded by Bohemond V
