= Raymond of Antioch (died 1213) =

Eldest son of Bohemond IV of Antioch

Raymond of Antioch (c. 1195 – 1213 in Tartus) was the eldest son of Bohemond IV of Antioch and Plaisance of Gibelet.

Raymond came of age in 1210, and it is probably at that point that his father made him his bailli in Antioch.

18-year-old Raymond, who was the heir to the throne of Antioch and Tripoli, was murdered by the Assassins in 1213 outside the door of the Cathedral of Our Lady of Tortosa. An involvement by the Hospitallers, who were hostile to the victim's father, remained speculation in contemporary lore.

In retaliation, Raymond's father Bohemond IV and a reinforcement of Knights Templars assaulted the Assassins' stronghold in Nizari Isma'ili fortress in Khawabi in 1214. The Assassins requested aid from the Ayyubid ruler of Aleppo, az-Zahir Ghazi, who in turn appealed to his rival and uncle al-Adil, the Ayyubid sultan of Egypt. However, after al-Adil's son, al-Mu'azzam of Damascus, launched several raids against Bohemond's district of Tripoli, destroying all of its villages, Bohemond IV was compelled to withdraw from Khawabi and issue an apology to az-Zahir.

== Bibliography ==
- Daftary, Farhad (2007). The Isma'ilis: Their History and Doctrines. Cambridge University Press. ISBN 978-0521850841.
- Humphreys, Stephen (1977), From Saladin to the Mongols: The Ayyubids of Damascus, 1193-1260, SUNY Press, ISBN 0-87395-263-4
- Runciman, Steven (1987). A History of the Crusades: The Kingdom of Jerusalem and the Frankish East, 1100-1187. CUP Archive. ISBN 0521347718.
