= Peter of Angoulême =

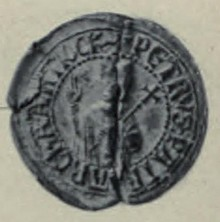
Seal of Peter II of Angoulême

Peter of Angoulême (died July 1208), also called Peter of Lydda, was a French prelate who served successively as the chancellor of the Kingdom of Jerusalem, bishop of Tripoli until 1196 and Latin patriarch of Antioch from 1196 to 1208. He was imprisoned after a rebellion against Prince Bohemond IV of Antioch. He died of thirst after he could only drink the oil of his lamp in his prison in Antioch.

== Sources ==
- Burgtorf, Jochen (2016). "The Antiochene war of succession". In Boas, Adrian J. (ed.). The Crusader World. The University of Wisconsin Press. pp. 196–211. ISBN 978-0-415-82494-1.
- Hardwicke, Mary Nickerson (1969) [1962]. "The Crusader States, 1192-1243". In Setton, Kenneth M.; Wolff, Robert Lee; Hazard, Harry W. (eds.). A History of the Crusades, Volume II: The Later Crusades, 1189–1311. Vol. 2 (Second ed.). Madison, Milwaukee, and London: University of Wisconsin Press. pp. 522–554. ISBN 0-299-04844-6.
- Runciman, Steven (1989). A History of the Crusades, Volume III: The Kingdom of Acre and the Later Crusades. Cambridge University Press. ISBN 0-521-06163-6.

Government offices
Preceded by Lambert	Chancellor of Jerusalem; 1185–1191	Succeeded by Odo
Religious titles
Preceded by Aimery	Bishop of Tripoli; 1191–1196	Succeeded by Lawrence
Preceded by Ralph II	Latin Patriarch of Antioch; 1196–1208	Succeeded by Peter of Ivrea
