= Raymond IV of Tripoli =

Count of Tripoli from 1187 to 1189 and regent of Antioch from 1193 to 1194

Raymond IV (c. 1170 – early 1197), also known as Raymond of Antioch, was count of Tripoli from 1187 to 1189 and acted as regent of the Principality of Antioch during the captivity of his father, Bohemond III of Antioch, in 1193–1194. He was the eldest son of Bohemond III and his wife Orgueilleuse of Harenc.

== Early life and succession to Tripoli ==
Raymond was the eldest son of Bohemond III and was his father's designated heir to the Principality of Antioch. In 1187, his godfather, Raymond III of Tripoli, died without surviving children and designated Raymond as his successor to the County of Tripoli. Bohemond III nevertheless sent his younger son, Bohemond, to take possession of Tripoli, while Raymond was brought back to Antioch. Raymond is conventionally listed as count of Tripoli from 1187 to 1189, although the extent of his personal exercise of authority there is uncertain.

The transfer reflected Bohemond III's dynastic priorities: Raymond was his eldest son and intended successor in Antioch, whereas Tripoli provided his younger son with a territorial base. The episode occurred during the rapid deterioration of the Latin states following the Battle of Hattin and Saladin's conquest of much of the County of Tripoli and the Principality of Antioch.

== Regency in Antioch ==
In October 1193, Leo I of Cilician Armenia captured Bohemond III during negotiations concerning the fortress of Bagras. Leo attempted to exploit Bohemond's captivity to strengthen his position in Antioch. The city's mainly Greek and Latin burghers resisted and formed a commune, which recognized Raymond as lord of Antioch until his father's release.

Raymond consequently became the effective ruler of Antioch during Bohemond's captivity. His younger brother Bohemond, then count of Tripoli, also came to Antioch to assist him. The crisis was eventually settled through the mediation of Henry of Champagne, king of Jerusalem. Bohemond III renounced his claims to suzerainty over Cilician Armenia and accepted Leo's possession of Bagras, after which Leo released him.

== Marriage and dynastic settlement ==
As part of the settlement between Antioch and Cilician Armenia, Raymond married Alice of Armenia, daughter of Roupen III and niece of Leo I. The marriage took place around the beginning of 1195.

The marriage had important dynastic and political consequences. It linked the ruling house of Antioch with the Armenian Kingdom of Cilicia and strengthened Raymond's position as heir to Antioch. Bohemond III subsequently secured recognition of Raymond as his successor among the Antiochene barons.

Raymond and Alice had one son, Raymond-Roupen. Raymond died in early 1197, leaving Alice pregnant with their son. Raymond-Roupen was therefore born posthumously.

== Death and succession ==
Raymond's early death created the circumstances for the later War of the Antiochene Succession. After Raymond-Roupen's birth, Bohemond III sent Alice and the infant to Cilicia. Around the beginning of 1198, the papal legate Conrad of Wittelsbach, archbishop of Mainz, intervened in the succession to Antioch. Bohemond III subsequently summoned his barons and had them swear to recognize Raymond-Roupen as his heir.

Raymond-Roupen's claim was nevertheless contested. Although he was the son of Bohemond III's eldest son, Raymond had died before becoming prince of Antioch, and there was no universally established precedent requiring an infant grandson to succeed in place of a surviving adult son. Raymond-Roupen's uncle Bohemond, count of Tripoli, therefore continued to assert his own claim. The commune of Antioch and other opponents of increased Armenian influence in the principality eventually supported Bohemond.

In late 1198 or early 1199, Bohemond seized control of Antioch. After Bohemond III's death in 1201, Bohemond became Prince of Antioch, while Raymond-Roupen continued to assert his claim with the support of Leo I and a faction of Antiochene nobles. The resulting conflict, known as the War of the Antiochene Succession, lasted until 1219.

Raymond's short political career therefore had lasting consequences for the history of Antioch. His death left an infant son whose descent from the eldest branch of Bohemond III's family became the basis of a prolonged challenge to the rule of Raymond's younger brother.

Preceded by Raymond III	Count of Tripoli; 1187–1189	Succeeded by Bohemond IV
