= Proximity of blood =

Way to determine hereditary succession

Proximity of blood, or proximity by degree of kinship, is one of the ways to determine hereditary succession based on genealogy. In effect, the application of this rule is a refusal to recognize the right of representation, a component of primogeniture.

Proximity of blood diagram. Legend: Grey: incumbent; Square: male; Circle: female; Black: deceased; Diagonal: cannot be displaced

In some feudal entities, proximity of blood was a generally accepted principle. For example, according to the "ancient custom" (French: ancienne coutume) in the Duchy of Burgundy, a grandson could not take precedence over a son or daughter, and it was not even clear whether the ruler's grandson could claim precedence over the ruler's brother.

== Examples ==
Proximity of blood and primogeniture were at loggerheads in numerous medieval succession disputes.

=== Successful applications ===
- When Richard the Lionheart died in 1199, the succession to the English throne, as well as to Normandy and Anjou, was disputed between his fourth but sole surviving brother, John, and his nephew Arthur (the son of his second brother, Geoffrey). The Angevin law favoured primogeniture and thus Arthur, while the Norman law recognized the proximity of blood and gave precedence to John. Arthur's claim had been recognized by Richard in 1191, but just before his death Richard expressed support for John, who in the end prevailed.
- Alfonso X of Castile wished to enforce primogeniture by the Siete Partidas in the late 1270s and bequeath his crown to Alfonso, the son of his deceased eldest son, Ferdinand. His second but eldest surviving son, Sancho, rebelled with the support of the nobility and successfully claimed the crown by degree of kinship.
- In 1307, a dispute erupted over the County of Artois between Mahaut, who had succeeded her father, Robert II, in 1302, and Mahaut's nephew, Robert. Robert II had outlived his son, Philip, and Mahaut put herself forward as "the closest relative to our said father at the time of his death, the reason of propinquity or proximity being notorious in custom". Her nephew, Philip's son, insisted on "representation of our aforesaid father who was the first born of our same grandfather". His appeal was rejected in 1309 on the basis that the established custom of Artois favoured Mahaut, but he never relinquished his claim.
- Odo IV, Duke of Burgundy, having outlived his son Philip, decreed in his will in 1348 that he should be succeeded by his grandson, also named Philip, unless Odo fathered another son. Odo's grandson, however, should have precedence over any daughters Odo might have and over Odo's sisters. In case of Philip's death without issue, the duchy was to pass to Odo's youngest but sole surviving sister, Joan, rather than to the descendants of his deceased older sisters. Odo IV had no further sons and was succeeded by his grandson, Philip I. Philip died childless in 1361, having outlived his grandfather's last sibling, Joan. The duchy would have gone to Charles II of Navarre, grandson of Odo's older sister Margaret, according to primogeniture, but was successfully claimed by John II of France, son of the younger sister Joan, according to proximity of blood. Since Charles was the grandson of a sister of Odo and John was the son of another, the latter was one degree closer to the dukes of Burgundy than Charles.
- During the reign of Charles XII of Sweden, it was never resolved whether his heir should be his younger sister, Ulrika Eleonora, or his nephew, Charles Frederick (the son of his deceased elder sister, Hedwig Sophia). The sister was more closely related to the reigning king, but the nephew had precedence according to primogeniture. Upon Charles XII's death in 1718 it was Ulrika Eleonora who successfully claimed the crown.

=== Failed applications ===
- In 1269, upon the death of Conrad III of Jerusalem, Maria of Antioch and Hugh III of Cyprus both claimed the crown. She was the daughter of Melisende, fifth daughter of Isabella I of Jerusalem, while he was the grandson of Alice, second daughter of Isabella I. Maria was the only living grandchild of Isabella I and closer in kinship to Conrad III (first cousin twice removed) and the other kings of Jerusalem, while Hugh had precedence by primogeniture but was more distantly related to Conrad III (second cousin) and Isabella I (great-grandchild). The High Court decided in favour of Hugh but Maria did not relinquish her claim.
- Alexander III of Scotland drafted a treaty in 1281 in which he set out the rules of succession among his descendants. The provisions appeared to favour primogeniture for male heirs but proximity of blood for female heirs; the son of a deceased older son would take precedence over a surviving younger son but a younger daughter over a deceased older daughter's children. Upon the death of his granddaughter and successor, Margaret, in 1290, the succession was unclear. Robert de Brus claimed the crown by proximity in degree of kinship to the kings of Scotland, while John Balliol made a claim based on primogeniture. Robert and John were both descended from David of Huntingdon, the grandson of David I of Scotland; Robert was his grandson (son of Isobel, second daughter of David of Huntingdon) while John was his great-grandson (grandson of Margaret, first daughter of David of Huntingdon). Arbitration by Edward I of England awarded the throne to John through primogeniture, but Robert's grandson later successfully claimed the crown as Robert I of Scotland.

== See also ==
- Line of succession to the Dutch throne, whereby the Dutch crown is restricted to relatives of the monarch within three degrees of kinship
