= Alice of Armenia =

Alice
- Lady of Toron
- Born: 1182
- Died: after 1234
- Spouse: Hathum, Lord of Sasun (m. 1189; died 1193); Raymond IV, Count of Tripoli (c. 1195; died 1198); Vahram, Lord of Korikos (m. 1220; died 1222)
- Issue: Raymond-Roupen, Prince of Antioch
- House: House of Roupen
- Father: Ruben III, Prince of Armenia
- Mother: Isabella of Toron

Alice of Armenia (1182 – after 1234) was ruling Lady of Toron from 1229 to 1234 as the eldest daughter of Ruben III, Prince of Armenia and his wife Isabella of Toron. She was heiress of Toron as well as a claimant to the throne of Armenia. She married three times; by her second marriage she was Countess of Tripoli, and she only had children from this marriage.

== Life ==
=== Early life and first marriage ===
Alice was the elder of two children born to Prince Ruben and his wife Isabella; Alice's younger sister was Philippa of Armenia. At the time of her father's death, Alice was four or five years of age. He abdicated and died in 1187, and was succeeded by his brother Leo. Leo was initially the 'Regent and Tutor' of his young nieces but he eventually set them aside and was succeeded by his own descendants.

Isabella died sometime between 1192 and 1229, and upon her death, Alice became heiress of Toron; Toron was occupied by Muslims at the time. Around 1189, both Alice and Philippa were betrothed. Alice was betrothed to Hathum, Lord of Sasun and Philippa to a son of the Lord of Sasun.

Both sisters married roughly around the same time in 1189. In May, 1193, their spouses were both murdered. The sisters are mentioned by Sempad the Constable as their widows. Sempad also recorded contemporary rumours that their uncle Leo was behind both assassinations. Since Alice was only eleven-years-old and Philippa ten, the marriages were likely not consummated.

=== Second marriage ===
Alice was secondly betrothed to Raymond IV, Count of Tripoli, in order to bring peace between Raymond's family in Antioch and Alice's family in Armenia. They needed permission from Henry II, Count of Champagne, husband of Isabella I of Jerusalem for the marriage, which he gave them after Alice's uncle released Raymond's father Bohemond III, Prince of Antioch. Alice and Raymond were married around 1195. The couple were only married for roughly three years before Raymond died; Alice being pregnant at the time. According to Sempad, it was agreed that any son born of the marriage would succeed her uncle in Armenia. Months after Raymond's death, Alice gave birth to a son, Raymond-Roupen.

After the birth of her son, Alice was sent back to her homeland of Armenia from Antioch by her father-in-law. However, Bohemond agreed to make Raymond Roupen his heir. In 1201, Bohemond died and went back on his word, making his younger son Bohemond Prince of Antioch instead. In 1216, Bohemond was overthrown with the help of Leo, and Raymond Roupen was made Prince of Antioch. However, this only lasted until 1219 when Bohemond conquered and re-gained control.

=== Third marriage and later life ===
On 2 May 1219, King Leo died and left Armenia to his younger daughter, Isabelle; under the regency firstly of Adam of Baghras and after his assassination, Constantine of Baberon. Several factions were against the succession and other candidates pressed their claims. Sybilla of Lusignan, mother of Isabelle put her claim on the throne but was exiled by Constantine. Leo's older daughter Stephanie put her claim forward along with that of her young son, but they later died. In 1219, Alice claimed the throne on behalf of her son; to strengthen the claim, in 1220 she married Vahram, Lord of Korikos.

In 1222, Constantine had Vahram murdered, Raymond-Roupen either died in battle or died in prison and Alice was imprisoned and later exiled. Raymond-Roupen left Alice with a granddaughter, Maria of Antioch-Armenia, who succeeded as Lady of Toron and unsuccessfully claimed Armenia. Isabelle was then left as the legitimate heir to the throne.

After her release, Alice turned to her inheritance rights in Palestine. From her mother she had inherited the rights to Toron and Oultrejordain, and stakes in the Kingdom of Jerusalem, but the Kingdom had not occupied since 1187 by Christians since the Muslim invasion. Toron had been taken over by the Muslims in 1219. Toron was recovered through the treaty of Jaffa in 1229, just two years after al-Mu'azzam's death on November 11, 1227, by Frederick II, Holy Roman Emperor from Sultan al-Kamil. As Toron was sold in 1220 to the Teutonic Knights together with the territories called the Seigneury de Joscelin, it came to a dispute between them and Alice. She successfully claimed her rights before the High Court and Frederick II assigned the lordship to her.

Alice died sometime after 1234. She managed to outlive all three of her husbands, her sister, son and uncle. Toron passed to her granddaughter Maria.

Preceded by Islamic occupance (disputed by Isabelle)	Lady of Toron; 1229–c. 1236	Succeeded by Maria
