= Helvis of Cyprus =

Helvis
- Born: c. 1190
- Died: c. 1218 (aged 27–28)
- Spouse: Odo of Dampierre; Raymond-Roupen of Antioch
- Issue: Maria, Lady of Toron
- House: House of Lusignan
- Father: Aimery of Cyprus
- Mother: Eschiva of Ibelin

Helvis of Lusignan (c. 1190 – c. 1218) was the daughter of King Aimery of Cyprus and his first wife, Eschiva of Ibelin.

She was married twice. Firstly, she was given in marriage to Odo of Dampierre, a French knight, in about 1205. With Odo she had children, including Richard of Dampierre. The details of her second marriage are revealed in a letter from Pope Innocent III to the patriarch of Antioch, dated September 1211. Helvis had been taken from her husband by (or fled from him with) the young Raymond-Roupen of Antioch, designated heir to the Armenian throne, and although ecclesiastical authorities commanded the return to her husband, Helvis refused. The young couple seem to have been encouraged by Helvis's brother-in-law, Walter of Montbéliard, which infuriated Helvis's brother King Hugh.

She and Raymond-Roupen had issue:

- Maria of Antioch-Armenia (1215–1257); married Philippe de Montfort, Lord of Castres, of Tyre, and of Toron (died 1270)
- Eschiva of Antioche (who seems to have died young). Critical genealogists have concluded that she did not marry Hetoum, Lord of Lampron (1220–1250), of the House of Hetoumid, although a lot of older genealogical fantasies present that marriage.

The date of Helvis's death is not known.

== Sources ==
- This page is a translation of fr:Helvis de Lusignan.
