= Principality of Antioch =

Crusader state in the Levant from 1098 to 1268

Principality of Antioch Principatus Antiochenus (Latin) Princeté de Antioch (Norman)
- 1098–1268
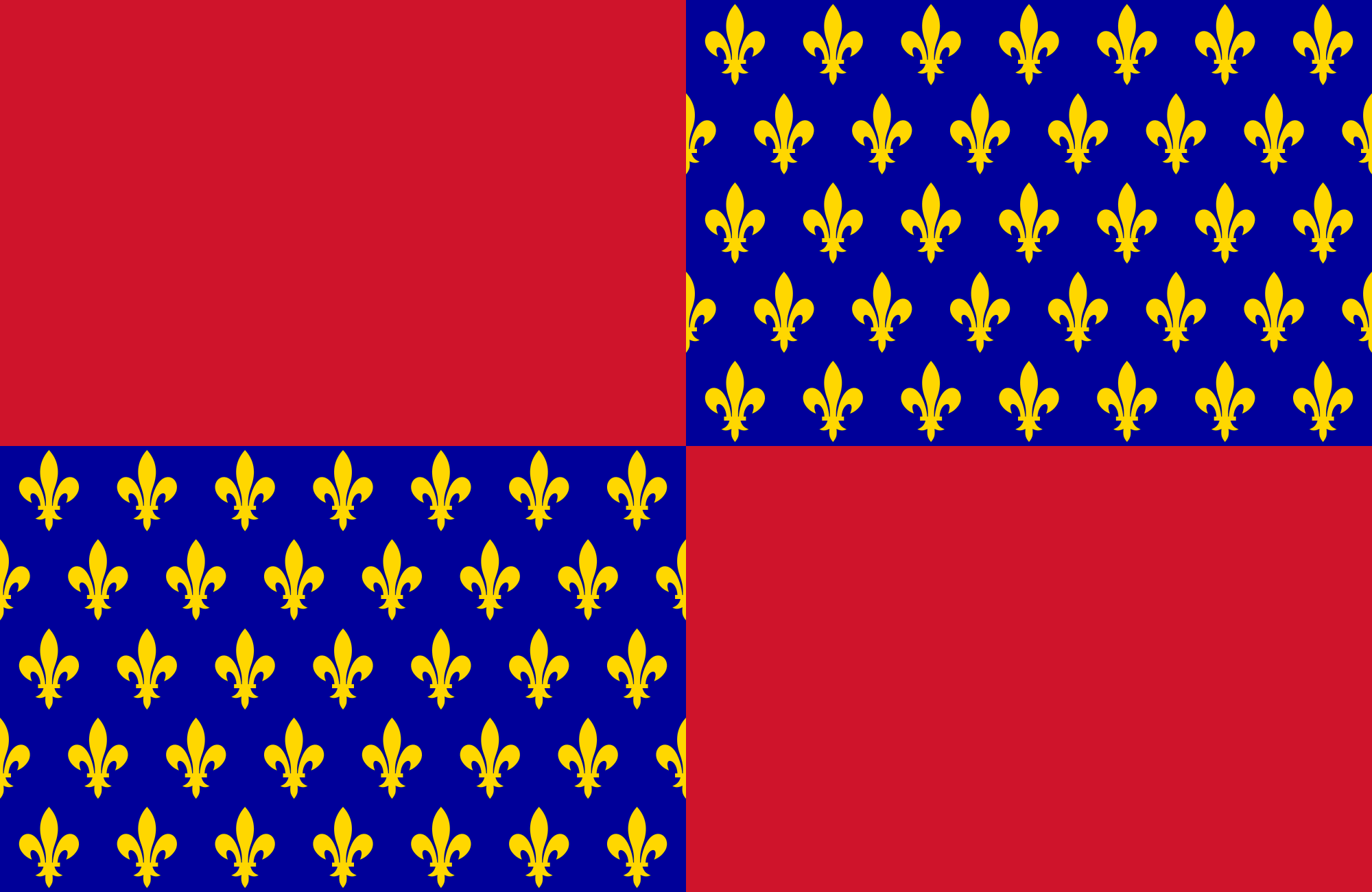
- Heraldic banner of Poitiers-Antioch (derived from the arms) Arms of Poitiers-Antioch until 1252 Arms of Poitiers-Antioch from 1252

- Attributed arms to the Principality of Antioch

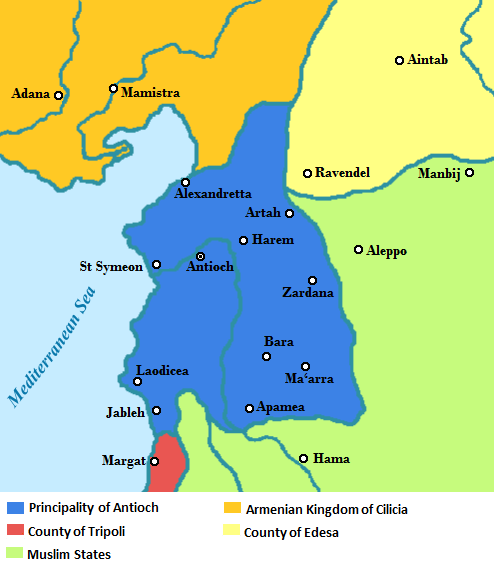
- The Principality of Antioch in the context of the other states of the Near East in 1135 AD
- Status: Vassal of the Byzantine Empire (1138–1153, 1159–1183); Vassal of the Armenian Kingdom of Cilicia (1254–1260); Vassal of the Ilkhanate (1260–1268)
- Capital: Antioch (modern-day Antakya, Hatay, Turkey); 36°12′17″N 36°10′54″E
- Common languages: Medieval Latin, Old Norman, Old French, Armenian, Aramaic, Greek, Arabic
- Religion: Latin Church (ruling elite and nobility); Eastern Christianity; Islam (Majority); Judaism (minority)
- Government: Feudal monarchy
- Prince of Antioch
  - 1098–1111 (first): Bohemond I
  - 1252–1268 (last): Bohemond VI
- Historical era: High Middle Ages
  - First Crusade: 1098
  - Conquered by the Mamluk Sultanate under Baibars: 1268
Preceded by	Succeeded by
Seljuk Empire; Sultanate of Rum	Mamluk Sultanate; Emirate of Kilis
- Today part of: Turkey; Syria

The Principality of Antioch (Latin: Principatus Antiochenus; Norman: Princeté de Antioch) was one of the Crusader states created during the First Crusade which included parts of Anatolia (modern-day Turkey) and Syria. The principality was much smaller than the County of Edessa or the Kingdom of Jerusalem. It extended around the northeastern edge of the Mediterranean, bordering the County of Tripoli to the south, Edessa to the east, and the Byzantine Empire or the Kingdom of Armenia to the northwest, depending on the date.

It had roughly 20,000 inhabitants in the 12th century, most of whom were Armenians and Greek Orthodox Christians, with a few Muslims outside the Antioch city itself. Most of the crusaders who settled there were of Norman origin, notably from the Duchy of Apulia and Calabria in southern Italy, as were the first rulers of the principality, who surrounded themselves with loyal subjects. Few of the inhabitants apart from the crusaders were Roman Catholic even though the city was under the jurisdiction of the Latin Patriarchate of Antioch, established in 1100. This patriarchate would endure as a titular one after the Crusades, until it was dropped in 1964.

== History ==
=== Foundation ===
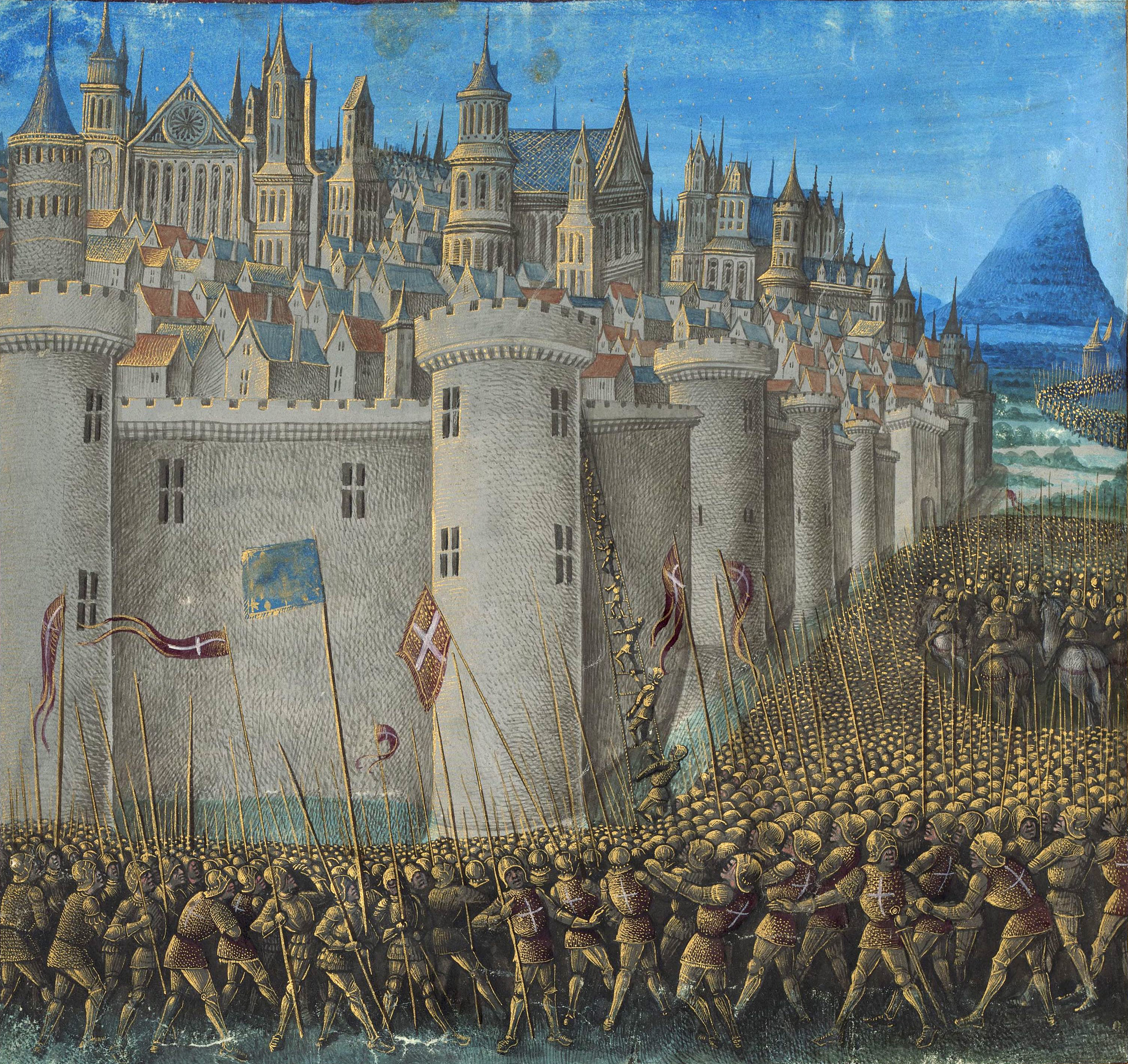
The Siege of Antioch, from a medieval miniature painting

The city of Antioch had been a major Byzantine stronghold in the area under the control of a dux before falling to the Seljuk Turks in 1084. Therefore, it was one of the cities the army of the First Crusade aimed to capture on its way to Jerusalem. While Baldwin of Boulogne headed east from Asia Minor to set up the County of Edessa, the main army of the First Crusade continued south to besiege Antioch in late October 1097. The army consisted of various leaders who had sworn to return all territory that had belonged to the Byzantine Empire as well as a Byzantine contingent under the command of the general Tatikios. With over four hundred towers, the city's defenses were formidable. The siege lasted throughout the winter, with much attrition among the Crusader force, who were often forced to eat their horses, or, as legend has it, the bodies of fellow Christians who had not survived. There were several attempts by neighbouring Turkish chiefs to relieve the town, but these were beaten back such as during the Battle of the Lake of Antioch under the military leadership of Bohemond of Taranto.

Coat of arms of the Hauteville dynasty

In May 1098 another relief force under Kerbogha, atabeg of Mosul, approached the city and thus it became important for the crusaders to act fast. Bohemond convinced a guard in one of the towers, an Armenian and former Christian named Firouz, to let the Crusaders enter the city on 2 June 1098. Only four days later, a Muslim army from Mosul, led by Kerbogha, arrived to besiege the Crusaders. Alexios I Komnenos, the Byzantine emperor, was on his way to assist the Crusaders, but upon hearing rumours that the city had fallen to the Muslims, Alexios turned back.

The Crusaders withstood the siege, with help from a mystic named Peter Bartholomew. Peter claimed he had been visited by Andrew the Apostle, who told him that the Holy Lance that pierced Christ's side as he was on the cross was located in the city. Excavations took place in the Basilica of Saint Peter and the Lance was discovered by Peter himself. Although it is possible Peter planted it there himself (the papal legate Adhemar of Le Puy believed this to be the case), it raised the spirits of the Crusaders as well as of the local Armenians and Greeks. With the relic at the head of the army, Bohemond marched out to meet the besieging Muslim force, which was defeated in the battle of Antioch in 1098. According to the Crusaders, an army of saints appeared to help them on the battlefield.

After this victory a lengthy dispute over who should control the city followed. Bohemond stated that the oath sworn to Alexios was nullified by Alexios' failure to bring them aid. He was resisted by count Raymond of Toulouse, who maintained that the city should be returned to Alexios and who would later found the County of Tripoli. Bohemond and his Italian Norman followers eventually won, not least because of the death of Adhemar of Le Puy, who had been the spiritual leader of the crusade and had been determined to cooperate with the Byzantines. Bohemond was already Prince (allodial lord) of Taranto in Italy. He desired to continue such independence in his new lordship, so he did not attempt to receive the title of Duke from the Byzantine Emperor, nor any other title with deep feudal obligations.

=== Early history ===
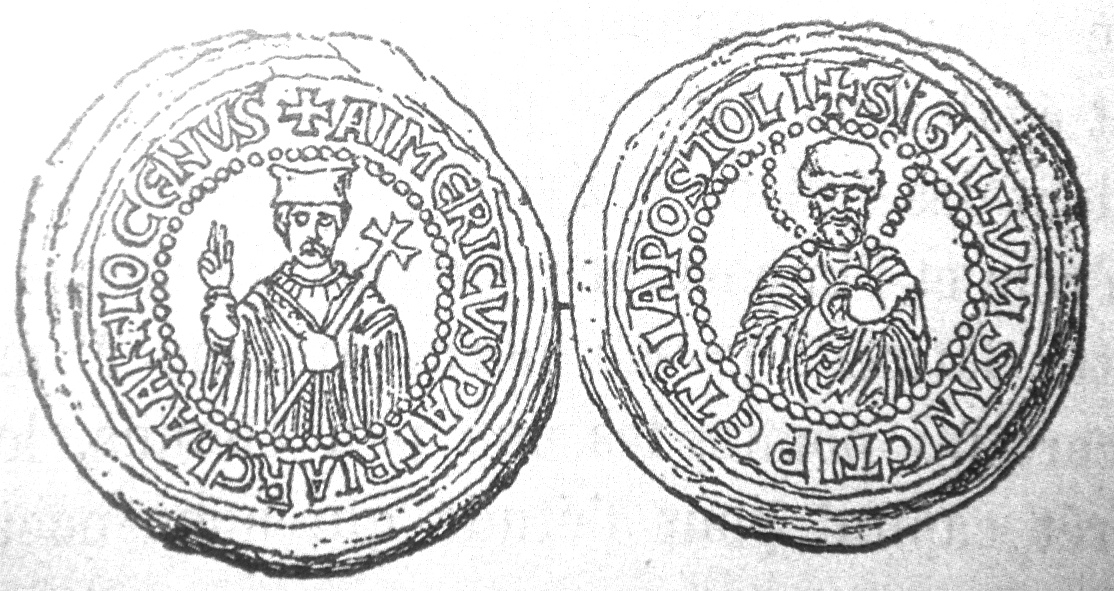
Seal (sigillum) of the Latin Patriarch of Antioch Aymery of Limoges (1139–1193), with bust of Aimery on the obverse

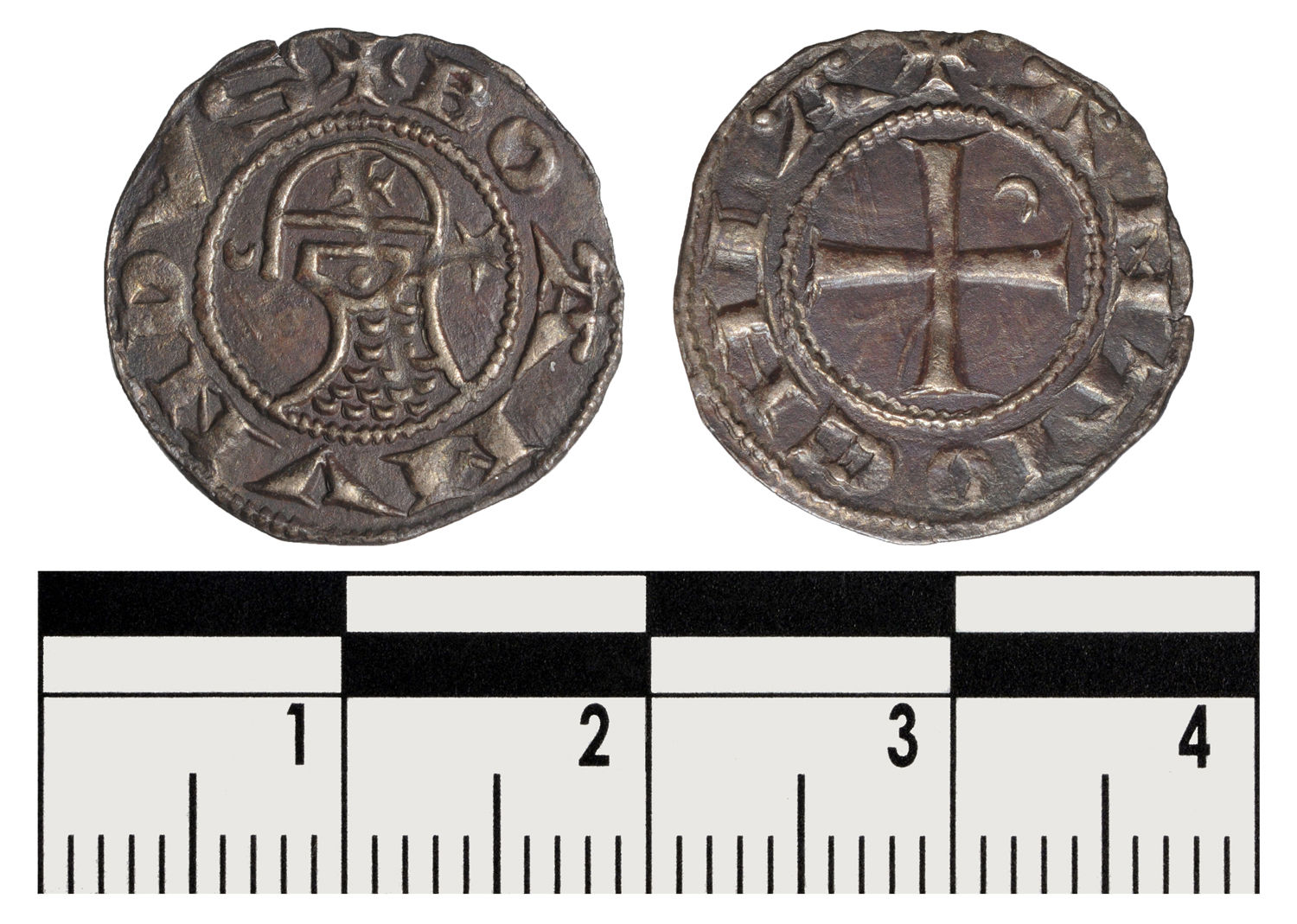
A rather unusual coin in the name of Bohemond. A bust sits in profile wearing a round helmet emblazoned with a cross with a prominent nasal-guard and a mail coif covering the neck. (1163–1201)

Bohemond started immediately after the victory against Kerbogha to secure and expand his principality. In August 1098 he crossed the Amanus Mountains to Cilicia to take control of the towns his nephew Tancred had captured in the previous summer. After the main crusade army left for Jerusalem in 1099, he took full control of Antioch as well as of the surrounding places such as Artah and the harbour of St. Symeon. Bohemond then attempted to take the harbour town of Latakia which was under Byzantine possession, but he had to leave after Raymond and the other crusading lords, who had in the meantime conquered Jerusalem, forced him to. In December 1099 Bohemond travelled to Jerusalem and had three priests consecrated as bishops for his principality.

Following Bohemond's capture in battle with the Danishmends in 1100, his nephew Tancred became regent. Tancred expanded the borders of the Principality, seizing the cities of Tarsus and Latakia from the Byzantine Empire. However those newly captured cities along with other territory were lost after the Battle of Harran when Baldwin II of Edessa was captured. Bohemond was released in 1103 and went to Italy to raise more troops in 1104, during which time Tancred remained regent of Antioch. Bohemond used the troops he raised to attack the Byzantines in 1107. Bohemond was defeated at Dyrrhachium in 1108 and was forced by Alexius I to sign the Treaty of Devol, making Antioch a vassal state of the Byzantine Empire upon Bohemond's death. Bohemond had promised to return any land that was seized from the Muslims when the Crusaders passed through Constantinople in 1097. Bohemond also fought at Aleppo with Baldwin and Joscelin of the County of Edessa; when Baldwin and Joscelin were captured, Tancred became regent in Edessa as well. Bohemond left Tancred as regent once more and returned to Italy, where he died in 1111.

Alexius wanted Tancred to return the Principality in its entirety to Byzantium, but Tancred was supported by the County of Tripoli and the Kingdom of Jerusalem. Tancred, in fact, had been the only Crusade leader who did not swear to return conquered land to Alexius (though none of the other leaders, save for Raymond IV of Toulouse, kept their oaths anyway). Tancred died in 1112 and was succeeded by Bohemond II, under the regency of Tancred's nephew Roger of Salerno, who defeated a Seljuk attack in 1113.

On June 27, 1119, Roger was killed at the Ager Sanguinis (the Field of Blood), and Antioch became a vassal state of Jerusalem with King Baldwin II as regent until 1126 (although Baldwin spent much of this time in captivity in Aleppo). Bohemond II, who married Baldwin's daughter Alice, ruled for only four years, and the Principality was inherited by his young daughter Constance; Baldwin II acted as regent again until his death in 1131, when Fulk of Jerusalem took power. In 1136, Constance, still only 8 years old, married Raymond of Poitiers, who was 36.

Raymond, like his predecessors, attacked the Byzantine province of Cilicia. This time, however, Emperor John II Komnenos fought back. He arrived in Antioch in 1138 and forced Raymond to swear fealty to him. There then followed a joint campaign as John led the armies of Byzantium, Antioch and Edessa against Muslim Syria. Aleppo proved too strong to attack, but the fortresses of Balat, Biza'a, Athereb, Maarat al-Numan and Kafartab were taken by assault. Although John fought hard for the Christian cause in the campaign in Syria, his allies, Prince Raymond of Poitiers and Count Joscelin II of Edessa, sat around playing dice instead of helping John to press the Siege of Shaizar. The city was taken, but the citadel defied assault. The Emir of Shaizar offered to pay a large indemnity, become John's vassal, and pay yearly tribute; the offer was reluctantly accepted by the emperor. On the return of the army to Antioch, a riot instigated by Joscelin II of Edessa forced the emperor to leave without the citadel being surrendered to him. John had plans to reconquer Antioch and become an effective overlord of the remaining Crusader states, but he died in 1143.

=== Antioch and the Byzantine Empire ===
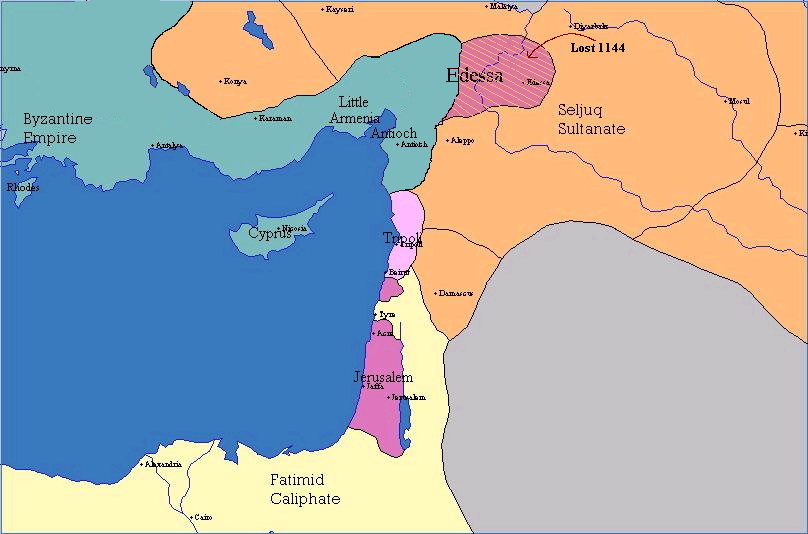
Antioch under Byzantine protection

After the fall of Edessa in 1144, Antioch was attacked by Nur ad-Din during the Second Crusade. Much of the eastern part of the Principality was lost, and Raymond was killed at the battle of Inab in 1149. Baldwin III of Jerusalem was technically regent for Raymond's widow Constance until 1153 when she married Raynald of Châtillon. Raynald, too, immediately found himself in conflict with the Byzantines, this time in Cyprus; he made peace with Manuel I Comnenus in 1158, and the next year Manuel arrived to take personal control of the Principality. From thence the Principality of Antioch was to be a vassal of Byzantium until Manuel's death in 1180. Although this arrangement meant that the Principality had to provide a contingent for the Byzantine Army (troops from Antioch participated in an attack on the Seljuk Turks in 1176), it also safeguarded the City against Nur ad-Din at a time when it was in serious danger of being overrun.

Raynald was taken prisoner by the Muslims in 1160, and the regency fell to the Patriarch of Antioch (Raynald was not released until 1176, and never returned to Antioch). Meanwhile, Manuel married Constance's daughter Maria, but as Constance was only nominally in charge of Antioch, she was deposed in 1163 and replaced by her son Bohemond III. Bohemond was taken captive by Nur ad-Din the following year at the Battle of Harim, and the Orontes River became the permanent boundary between Antioch and Aleppo. Bohemond returned to Antioch in 1165, and married one of Manuel's nieces; he was also convinced to install a Greek Orthodox patriarch in the city.

The Byzantine alliance came to an end with the death of the Emperor Manuel in 1180. Antioch was deprived of the Empire's protection, which had been enough to frighten Nur ad-Din away from intervening in the area for the preceding twenty years. Nevertheless, with help from the fleets of the Italian city-states, Antioch survived Saladin's assault on the Kingdom of Jerusalem in 1187. Neither Antioch nor Tripoli participated in the Third Crusade, although the remnants of Frederick Barbarossa's army briefly stopped in Antioch in 1190 to bury their king. Bohemond III's son, also named Bohemond, had become count of Tripoli after the Battle of Hattin, and Bohemond III's eldest son Raymond married an Armenian princess in 1194. Bohemond III died in 1201.

Bohemond's death resulted in a struggle for control between Antioch, represented by Bohemond of Tripoli, and Armenia, represented by Bohemond III's grandson Raymond-Roupen. Bohemond of Tripoli, as Bohemond IV, took control by 1207, but Raymond briefly ruled as a rival from 1216 to 1219. Bohemond died in 1233, and Antioch, ruled by his son Bohemond V, played no important role in the Fifth Crusade, Holy Roman Emperor Frederick II's struggles to take back Jerusalem in the Sixth Crusade, or Louis IX of France's Seventh Crusade.

=== Relations with other Latin settlements in the East ===
The Principality's relationship with other Latin settlements were based on two factors. The first factor was that the Princes of Antioch wanted to extend their power throughout the Latin east which led to conflict between the County of Edessa and the Kingdom of Jerusalem. Secondly, an alliance between the Latin rulers was secured through their shared situation in the East. This alliance was strengthened by feudal ties and marriage alliances among the eastern Latin rulers.

Baldwin of Boulogne, Count of Edessa, and Bohemond I were said to have had a relationship based on equality and brotherhood. For example, they travelled to Jerusalem in 1099 to consolidate their pilgrimage vows together. They also consecrated the Latin clerics as bishops in Antioch, including the County of Edessa. Bohemond I and Baldwin of Le Bourcq also had a close relationship – Baldwin was made commander of Antioch's militia by Bohemond in 1100.

A whole network of confraternities existed at this time. However, there were uneasy relations between the Principality and the region of Tripoli under Raymond, Count of Toulouse. Raymond allied with Emperor Alexius I Comnenus instead of Bohemond. In 1105, Bohemond left the east and he placed his nephew, Tancred, in charge of Antioch. In 1108, Bohemond also put Richard of Salerno in charge of Edessa, but Tancred was reluctant to hand it over because Tancred and Baldwin were fighting each other for possession of Edessa at the time. Tancred's resistance continued into 1109. At the same time, a conflict between Antioch and the Count of Tripoli, William-Jordan, was settled when the latter agreed to surrender Tripoli in exchange for confirmation of his possession of Toulouse. Bertrand of Toulouse then entered an alliance with Baldwin I of Jerusalem. In 1110, a council convened after William-Jordan was killed. After this, Antioch and Edessa appear to have reconciled.

In 1111 when the Muslim army of Maudud of Mosul threatened the Principality, its Latin allies responded by bringing military aid. In 1112, Bertrand of Toulouse died and Roger of Salerno took over Edessa. During this period, there was a better relationship between Antioch and Edessa as well as with the Kingdom of Jerusalem. For example, in 1115 in the lead-up to the battle of Tell Danith, the Edessene faction of the army was integral to Antioch's overall army. In 1118 the forces of Jerusalem, Antioch and Tripoli combined to meet an army from Egypt and Damascus that was threatening the Kingdom of Jerusalem.

But in 1119 Roger of Salerno was killed, leaving no adult heir. This shifted the balance of power in northern Syria, as Baldwin II, King of Jerusalem, was appointed Regent. At this time, Joscelin of Courtenay enjoyed a stable rule in Edessa, further weakening Antioch's dominance in Northern Syria. In 1126, Bohemond II arrived in the east and because Baldwin wanted Antioch and Jerusalem to maintain a close relationship, he arranged a marriage between the Prince of Antioch and his daughter, Alice. In 1127, a dispute between Bohemond and Joscelin of Courtenay led to Joscelin conducting raids in the Principality. In 1130, a succession crisis followed Bohemond II's death, signifying the end of Antioch's dominance of northern Syria.

=== Fall of the Principality ===
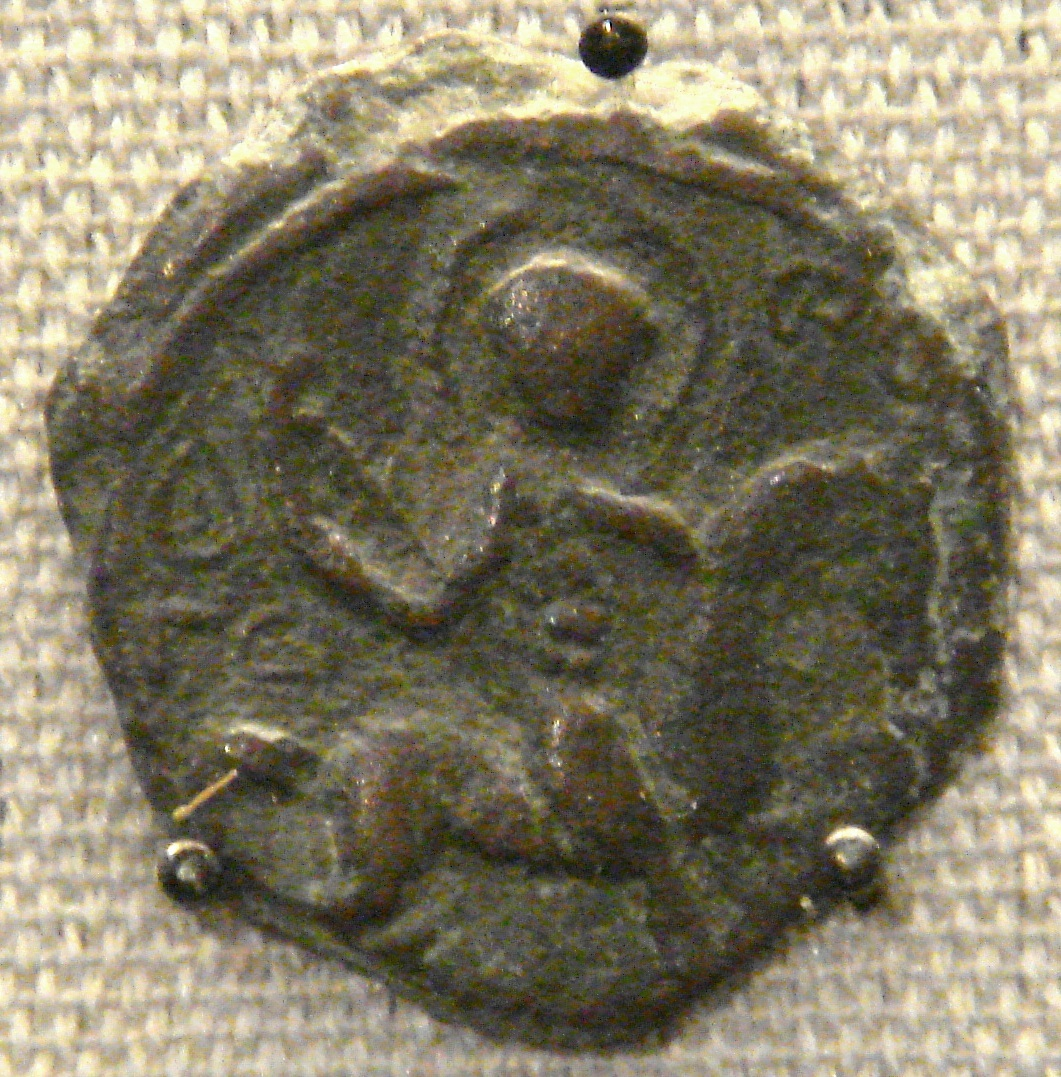
Coin of the Principality of Antioch, 1112–1119, Saint George on horseback.

In 1254 Bohemond VI married Sibylla of Armenia, ending the power struggle between the two states, although by this point Armenia was the more powerful of the two and Antioch was essentially a vassal state. Both were swept up by the conflict between the Mamluks and the Mongols. In 1260, under the influence of his father-in-law, the Armenian king Hetoum I, Bohemond VI submitted to the Mongols under Hülegü, making Antioch a tributary state of the Mongol Empire. Bohemond and Hetoum fought on the side of the Mongols during the conquests of Muslim Syria, taking together the city of Aleppo, and later Damascus.

When the Mongols were defeated at the Battle of Ain Jalut in 1260, Baibars, the Mamluk sultan of Egypt, began to threaten Antioch, which (as a vassal of the Armenians) had supported the Mongols. Baibars finally took the city in 1268, and all of northern Syria was quickly lost; twenty-three years later, Acre was taken, and the Crusader states ceased to exist.

In the colophons of the Malatia Gospel of 1268 (MS No. 10675), Armenian manuscript illuminator Toros Roslin described the brutal sacking of Antioch by Baibars: "...at this time great Antioch was captured by the wicked king of Egypt, and many were killed and became his prisoners, and a cause of anguish to the holy and famous temples, houses of God, which are in it; the wonderful elegance of the beauty of those that were destroyed by fire is beyond the power of words." The empty title of "Prince of Antioch" passed, with the extinction of the counts of Tripoli, to the kings of Cyprus, and was sometimes granted as a dignity to junior members of the royal house.

== Non-Latin population ==
The native population of the principality was rather diverse. A significant proportion were Miaphysite Armenians, who could be found in Antioch and other urban and rural areas. Based on the rich evidence available, it has even been proposed that they were the most numerous ethnic group. Also important were the so-called suriani, who actually comprised two Christian peoples: the Aramaic-speaking Syriacs (also called "Jacobites") and the Arabic-speaking Melkites. When the county of Edessa fell in 1144 and the region around Melitene became increasingly unsafe, many Jacobites sought refuge in the cities and town of the principality. This led among other things to the spread of the veneration of Mor Barsauma to whom a church was erected in 1156 by a couple of Frankish donors. The first prior was a monk of the Mor Bar Sauma Monastery with which the church maintained close ties.

Furthermore, there were also Muslims in the capital, in the south, and probably also the east of the principality. They appear only rarely in Antiochene charters, making an estimation of their numbers difficult. Other minorities were the Greeks (graeci) and Jews.

== Vassals of Antioch ==
=== Lordship of Saône ===
The Lordship of Saône was centered on the castle of Saône, but included the towns of Sarmada (lost in 1134) and Balatanos. Saône was captured by Saladin from the last lord, Matthew, in 1188. The lords of Saône were:

- Robert the Leper (d. 1119)
- William of Zardana (1119–1132)

== Great officers of Antioch ==
Like Jerusalem, Antioch had its share of great offices, including constable, marshal, seneschal, duke, viscount, butler, chamberlain, and chancellor.

== See also ==
- History of the County of Tripoli

== Bibliography ==
=== Primary sources ===
- Ibn al-Qalanisi, The Damascus Chronicle of the Crusades, trans. H. A. R. Gibb (London, 1932).
- John Kinnamos, Deeds of John and Manuel Comnenus, trans. C. M. Brand (New York, 1976).
- Matthew of Edessa, The Chronicle of Matthew of Edessa, trans. A. E. Dostourian (Lanham, New York, London, 1993).
- Orderic Vitalis, The Ecclesiastical History of Orderic Vitalis, ed. and trans. M. Chibnall, vols V–VI (Oxford, 1975–1978).
- Walter the Chancellor, Bella Antiochena, ed. H. Hagenmeyer (Innsbruck, 1896)(in German).

=== Secondary sources ===
- Angold M., The Byzantine Empire 1025–1204, 2nd ed. (London, 1997)
- Asbridge, Thomas S. (2000). The creation of the Principality of Antioch : 1098–1130. The Boydell Press. ISBN 978-0851156613. OCLC 920135552.
- Barlow F., The Feudal King of England 1042–1216 (London, 1988)
- Beaumont A. A., "Albert of Aachen and the County of Edessa", The Crusades and other historical essays presented to Dana C. Munro, ed. L. J. Paetow (New York, 1928), pp. 101–138.
- Buck, Andrew D. (2017). The Principality of Antioch and its Frontiers in the Twelfth Century. Woodbridge: Boydell & Brewer. ISBN 978-1783271733.
- Brown, R. A., The Normans (Woolbridge, 1984)
- Bella Antiochena, ed. H.Ferdinandi, Sergio (2017). La Contea Franca di Edessa. Fondazione e Profilo Storico del Primo Principato Crociato nel Levante (1098–1150). Pontificia Università Antonianum – Rome. ISBN 978-88-7257-103-3.
- Edbury, P. W., "Feudal Obligations in the Latin East", Byzantion, vol. 47 (1977), pp. 328–356.
- Edgington, S. B., "From Aachen: A new perspective on relations between the Crusaders and Byzantium, 1095–1120", Medieval History, vol. 4 (1994)
- Hamilton, B., "Ralph of Domfront, patriarch of Antioch (1135–1140)", Nottingham Medieval Studies, vol. 28 (1984), pp. 1–21.
- Harris, Jonathan (2014), Byzantium and the Crusades, Bloomsbury, 2nd ed. ISBN 978-1-78093-767-0
- Hill, J. H., Raymond IV Count of Tolouse (New York, 1962)
- Holt, P. M., The Age of the Crusades (London, 1986)
- Richard, Jean (1999). The Crusades: c. 1071–c. 1291. Cambridge University Press. ISBN 978-0-521-62566-1.
- Runciman, Steven (1951), The History of the Crusades Volume I: The First Crusade and the Foundation of the Kingdom of Jerusalem, Cambridge University Press
- Vryonis, Speros (1971). The Decline of Medieval Hellenism in Asia Minor and the Process of Islamization from the Eleventh through the Fifteenth Century. University of California Press.
- Weltecke, Dorothea (2006). "On the Syriac Orthodox in the Principality of Antioch during the Crusader Period". In Ciggaar, Krijna Nelly; Metcalf, David Michael (eds.). East and West in the Medieval Eastern Mediterranean: Antioch from the Byzantine Reconquest Until the End of the Crusader Principality. Peeters Publishers. pp. 95–124. ISBN 978-90-429-1735-4.
