= Siege of Bourzey Castle =

Ayyubid siege in Syria, 12th century

Coordinates: 35°39′29″N 36°15′39″E

- Part of The Crusades
Date	20–23 August 1188
Location	Bourzey castle
Result	Ayyubid victory

Belligerents
Ayyubid Sultanate	Principality of Antioch

Commanders and leaders
Saladin; Imad al-Din of Sinjar	Unnamed Lord of Bourzey (surrendered)

Strength
Unknown	Unknown

Casualties and losses
Unknown	Unknown

In 1188, the Ayyubid Sultanate led by Saladin attacked the castle of Bourzey castle held by the Principality of Antioch, Saladin captured the castle.

== Siege ==
Having captured Bakas and Al-Shughur castles, Saladin moved his army south to Bourzey castle situated on a peak 320 meters above the floor of the Orontes valley, a notable Byzantine fortress occupied by Crusaders. Saladin arrived at the castle on August 20, encamped the bulk of his army on the banks of the Orontes, and the next day began surveying the territory. He began moving his secondary assault force and his artillery to a plateau on the saddle between the castle and the hills to the west.

According to Baha' al-Din, the Ayyubids surrounded the castle and began bombarding it day and night without stopping, ʿImād al-Dīn states that bombarding was ineffective, forcing Saladin to resort to frontal assaults. Two days later, Ibn al-Athir stated there was a defensive position that allowed some artillery to reach the castle, but defensive action forced the trebuchets to be out of action on August 22.

On August 23, Saladin Began dividing the elements of his attack force into three divisions each to fight for a certain time and then rest, Imad al-Din of Sinjar led the first division on duty, around the mid-day, the crusaders successfully repulsed the first wave attack with arrows and stones, the second wave, supported by third and first wave elements scaled the western side of the walls, compelling the crusaders to retreat and seek refuge in the citadel, contingents from the Ayyubid army who were still encamped close to the Orontes made their way up to the steep eastern slope and managed to scale the eastern walls which were devoid of defenders, from the citadel the crusader garrison surrendered.

The lord of Bourzey Castle, who was married to Sibylla's (the wife of Bohemond III of Antioch) sister, was spared by Saladin, who allowed him to go freely alongside his wife and children in recognition of the debt he owed the wife of the lord.

== Aftermath ==
Soon after this victory, Saladin marched against the Templar fortresses of Trapessac and Bagras successfully capturing them in September. Saladin then captured Safed.

== Bibliography ==
- Michael S. Fulton, Artillery in the Era of the Crusades, Siege Warfare and the Development of Trebuchet Technology, p. 169-173
- Behâ ed-Dîn (1897). C. R. Conder (ed.). The Life of Saladin. London: Committee of the Palestine Exploration Fund.
- Ibn al-Athir; Izz al-Din (2007). The Chronicle of Ibn al-Athir for the Crusading Period from al-Kamil fi'l-Ta'rikh. Part 2,. Translated by Richards, Donald Sidney. pp. 349-51.
- Helen J. Nicholson, Women and the Crusades, p. 68
- Marcus Graham Bull, Peter Edbury, Norman Housley, Jonathan Phillips, The Experience of Crusading Vol II, p. 189
