= Raynald of Saint-Valery =

Raynald of Saint-Valéry (died after 1165), also known as Renaud, was Lord of Harenc—a fiefdom in the Principality of Antioch—from 1158 to 1163.

== Life ==
Raynald was the son of Bernard II of Saint-Valéry and his wife Matilda. In 1097, Raynald's father is mentioned with his father, Walter of Saint-Valéry, during the conquest of Nicaea in the First Crusade.

Around 1157/1158, Raynald is witnessed as a knight in the retinue of Thierry, Count of Flanders. He went on pilgrimage to the Holy Land and there they took part in a military campaign against the Syrian Muslims under the leadership of Baldwin III, King of Jerusalem, in the summer of 1157. The crusaders took advantage of Nur al-Din Zengi's illness to expand the Principality of Antioch. Certainly, Thierry had in mind to hold of the conquered lands. First, they besieged the fortress of Shaizar, which Thierry should have received as a fief.

Raynald of Châtillon, Prince of Antioch, demanded that the new rulers should turn them into his vassals. However, Raynald only had seized the princely throne through his marriage with Constance, Princess of Antioch, the actual Antioch's ruler, and he was a minor noble unlike Thierry, who was a high noble in France. So that, Thierry refused to make him homage as his feudal lord. Although the crusaders had taken Shaizar's Lower Town and the Citadel was on the point of surrendering, they lifted the siege in October 1157 and the crusader army continued his march to the north.

After the army had occupied the ruins of Apamea, they sieged the castle of Harenc. Harenc had belonged to the Principality of Antioch, but it was conquest by Nur al-Din's forces in 1149. The crusader army conquered Harenc in February 1158. Since Thierry still refused to make homage to Raynald of Châtillon, the Harenc's castle and his surrounding domains were granted to Raynald of Saint-Valéry. As new Lord of Harenc, Raynald was engaged in another Baldwin III's campaign, where he distinguished in Nur al-Din's defeat, who had invaded Galilee.

The castle of Harenc was disputed during the next decade. On 12 August 1164, a Christian army was defeated by Nur al-Din during the battle of Harim, which was sent to relieve Harenc. Apparently, Raynald had already departed to England to that time y he sold his rights about Harenc to Joscelin III, Titular Count of Edessa, who is mentioned as Lord of Harenc around 1163. Raynald, probably had one daughter called Orguilleuse, who married with Bohemond III, Prince of Antioch and she was known as “Lord of Harenc's daughter”.

== Sources ==
- Baldwin, Marsall W. (1969) [1955]. "The Latin States under Baldwin III and Amalric I, 1143–1174; The Decline and Fall of Jerusalem, 1174–1189". In Setton, Kenneth M.; Baldwin, Marshall W. (eds.). A History of the Crusades, Volume I: The First Hundred Years (Second ed.). Madison, Milwaukee, and London: University of Wisconsin Press. pp. 528–561, 590–621. ISBN 0-299-04834-9.
- Edgington, Susan B., ed. (2007). Albert of Aachen: Historia Ierosolimitana, History of the Journey to Jerusalem. Oxford Medieval Texts. Clarendon Press. ISBN 978-0-19-920486-1.
- Nicholson, Robert Lawrence (1973). Joscelyn III and the Fall of the Crusader States: 1134-1199. Brill Publishers. ISBN 90-04-03676-8.
- Nielen, Marie-Adélaïde (2003). Lignages d'outremer: Introduction, notes et éditions critique. Paris: Académie des inscriptions et belles-lettres. ISBN 2-87754-141-X.
- Richard, Jean (1999). The Crusades. c. 1071 – c. 1291. Cambridge: Cambridge University Press. ISBN 0-521-62566-1.
- Runciman, Steven (2001). "Geschichte der Kreuzzüge". Sonderausgabe in einem Band ohne Quellen- und Literaturangaben, 33.–35. Tausend der Gesamtauflage (in German). Munich: C. H. Beck. ISBN 3-406-39960-6.
