= Aimery of Limoges =

Latin Patriarch of Antioch in the 12th century

- Latin Patriarch of Antioch
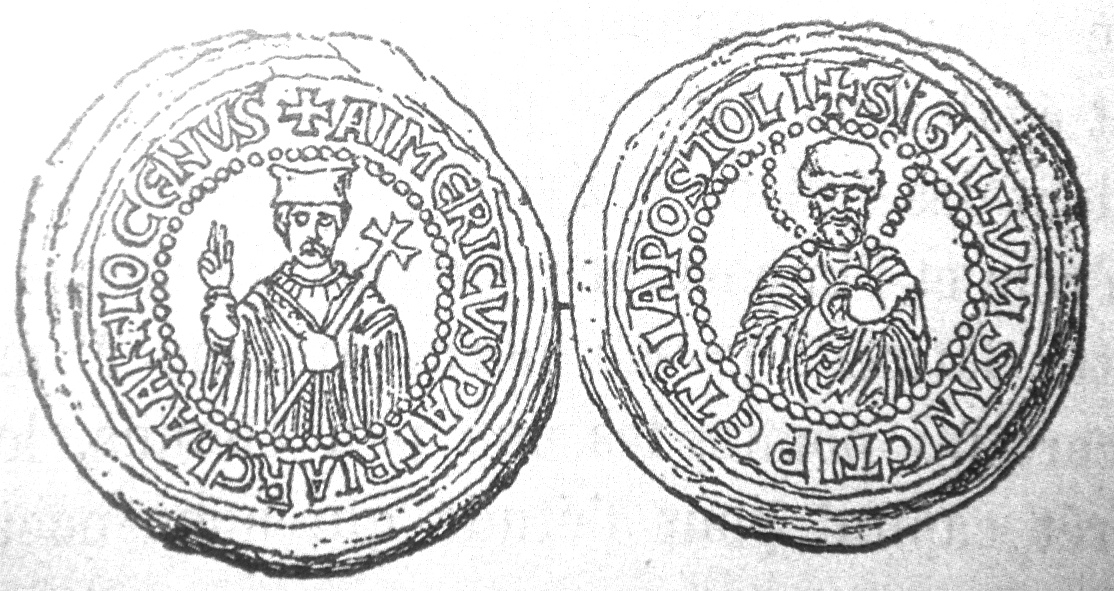
- Seal or bulla of Aimery, with his bust on the obverse
- Archdiocese: Antioch
- Elected: Legatine council of Antioch 1140
- In office: 1140/49–1196
- Predecessor: Ralph of Domfront
- Successor: Ralph II

Personal details
- Died: 1196

Aimery or Aymery of Limoges (died c. 1196), also Aimericus in Latin, Aimerikos in Greek and Hemri in Armenian, was a Roman Catholic ecclesiarch in Frankish Outremer and the fourth Latin Patriarch of Antioch from c. 1140 until his death. (Note: His reign may have begun as early as c. 1139 or as late as c. 1142. The first recorded date of his episcopate is April 1143, when he witnessed a charter of Raymond of Poitiers for Venice. Amalric of Jerusalem was crowned in February 1163 in Aimery's twentieth year as bishop. His death date is equally obscure: Michael the Syrian states 1193, the Continuation of William of Tyre says after 1194, and Les gestes des Chyprois say 1196) Throughout his lengthy episcopate he was the most powerful figure in the Principality of Antioch after the princes, and often entered into conflict with them. He was also one of the most notable intellectuals to rise in the Latin East.

Aimery was a nobleman of high rank, wealthy and worldly. According to later Carmelite writers, he was the uncle of Berthold of Calabria and was from Malifaye in France. He was an intellectual with sound knowledge of both Greek and Latin as well as some vernaculars. He may have been the first to translate parts of the Bible into a Romance language, namely Castilian. (Note: This work, La Fazienda de Ultra Mar, shows "familiarity with the Hebrew Bible and with Jewish exegesis", but is not the work of Aimery according to Michael E. Stone) As a scholar he was well-informed about Greek history. He wrote to Hugh Etherian requesting the commentaries of John Chrysostom on the Pauline epistles, the acts of the Council of Nicaea, and a history of the Byzantine emperors "from the time their emperors split away from the Roman Empire until the present day." He also fulfilled a request of Pope Eugenius III for a Latin translation of Chrysostom's commentary on the Gospel of Matthew by sending an original Greek manuscript to Rome. As bishop Aimery sought to control the hermits who inhabited the Black Mountain, ordering each to have his own spiritual adviser.

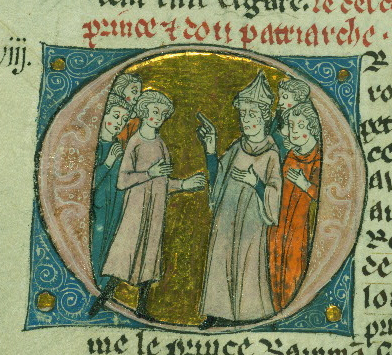
Amaury opposing the marriage of Raynauld and Constance, from William of Tyre's Histoire d'Outre Mer.

== Disputed succession (1140–49) ==
Aimery's succession to the patriarchate was disputed. His predecessor, Ralph de Domfront, was not dead, but rather had been deposed by a council convened by Alberic of Ostia, a papal legate, in November 1139 in Antioch. However, Ralph went to Rome and was arguing to Pope Innocent II to be reinstated. Aimery appears to have waited a long time for his consecration after Ralph's dismissal. Until 1149 there is no mention of Aimery as patriarch, probably because Ralph was alive and the legitimacy of either was suspect. After the Battle of Inab in 1149, the victorious Nureddin besieged the city of Antioch, which was stoutly defended by Aimery and the Princess Constance until a relief force led by Baldwin III of Jerusalem arrived and dispersed the Muslims. Ralph probably died in 1149 and Aimery was accepted universally among Catholics.

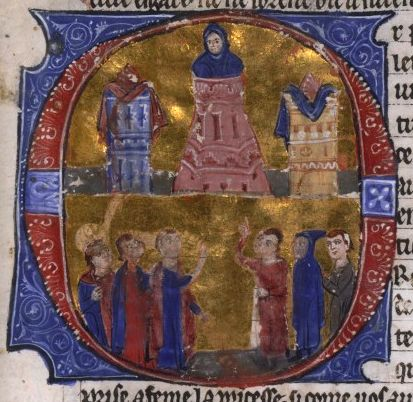
Raynald of Châtillon torturing Aimery, from a MS of William of Tyre's Historia and the Old French Continuation, painted in Acre, 13th century, now in the Bibliothèque nationale de France.

== Dispute with Raynald of Châtillon (1153) ==
In 1153 Aimery opposed the secret marriage of Constance to the petty nobleman Raynald of Châtillon. Aimery's subsequent relationship with Raynald was stormy. In 1156 Raynald claimed that the Byzantine emperor Manuel I Comnenus had reneged on his promise to pay Raynald a sum of money, and vowed to attack the island of Cyprus in revenge. When Aimery refused to finance this expedition, Raynald had the Patriarch seized, beaten until bloody, stripped naked, covered in honey, and left in the burning sun on top of the citadel to be attacked by insects. When the Patriarch was released, he collapsed in exhaustion and agreed to finance Raynald's expedition against Cyprus. Raynald's forces attacked Cyprus, ravaging the island and pillaging its inhabitants. Aimery meanwhile left Antioch for the city of Jerusalem, where he stayed until Raynald's capture.

== Exile in Jerusalem (1156–60) ==
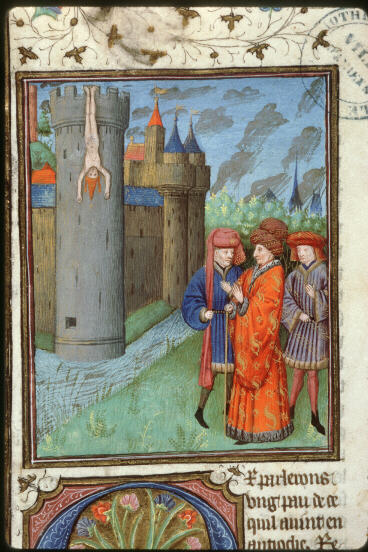
Torture of Aimery of Limoges by Raynald of Châtillon

In September 1158 Aimery performed the marriage of Theodora Comnena, Manuel's niece, and Baldwin III, because the elected Latin patriarch of Jerusalem, Amalric of Nesle, had yet to be consecrated. Aimery returned to Antioch with Baldwin in 1159.

In 1160 Aimery, with many other Palestinian prelates, recognised Alexander III as pope only after a long debate.

In 1160 Raynald was captured by Majd al-Dīn, the governor of Aleppo, and imprisoned. Though Constance claimed the right to rule on her own, Baldwin III installed her son by an earlier husband, Bohemond III, as prince and appointed Aimery regent. Constance protested this decision at the court of the emperor Manuel in Constantinople, as the Byzantine emperor was nominal overlord of Antioch.

== Regency (1164–65) and second exile (1165–71) ==
In 1164, Bohemond was captured by Nureddin at the Battle of Harim. Aimery assumed the regency of the principality and immediately sent a letter to Louis VII of France requesting military aid. The rule of the patriarch was brief. Bohemond was freed, for a ransom of 150,000 dinars, in 1165 through the intervention of Manuel and Amalric I of Jerusalem. Upon his release Bohemond visited Manuel and agreed to re-establish a Greek patriarch in Antioch, Athanasius I. Aimery protested this and imposed an interdict on the city. He remained in exile at his castle of al-Quṣayr (Xusayr) until the death of Athanasius in 1170 in an earthquake that destroyed the cathedral of St. Peter during the liturgy. By 1180 the Byzantine emperor was treating Aimery as the legitimate patriarch, and it is not unlikely that William of Tyre in some negotiations at Antioch and then Constantinople on behalf of Amalric of Jerusalem had reconciled them.

During his exile Aimery was on good terms with the Jacobite patriarch of Antioch, Michael the Syrian, whom he met at Jerusalem during Easter 1167. In order to humiliate Athanasius, Aimery arranged with Bohemond III for Michael's ceremonious entry into Antioch and there Aimery welcomed him in the cathedral of Saint Peter. (Note: This fact from the Chronicle of 1234 may be an erroneous reading of Michael's correspondence.) Michael stayed with Aimery until Easter 1169. He also invited the Jacobite to accompany him to the Third Lateran Council in 1179, and Michael obliged him with a treatise against Manichaeism that the Catholics could use against the Cathars, but declined to attend. Aimery was the first Latin prelate to allow the Jacobite patriarch to appoint a vicar, his brother Athanasius, in Antioch.

== Antioch under interdict (c. 1180–81) ==
In late 1180, Bohemond left his wife Theodora, a niece of the recently deceased Emperor Manuel, and married a woman named Sibylla, "who had the reputation of practicing evil arts" according to William of Tyre. He was excommunicated by Pope Alexander III, and Antioch was placed under an interdict. He imprisoned Aimery and other bishops and looted their churches. Aimery, supported by the nobility of Antioch under their leader, Rainald II Masoir, lord of Margat, held out in al-Quṣayr under siege by Bohemond. Aimery himself took part in the fighting and even instigating rioting against Bohemond's rule. Baldwin IV of Jerusalem intervened by sending Patriarch Eraclius of Jerusalem to Laodicea to negotiate with both parties. Bohemond remained excommunicate so long as he kept Sibylla, and Aimery's church property was returned, but the interdict on Antioch was lifted. This brief civil war has long been the subject of disputed dating. That the fighting took place in 1180 and the negotiations over 1180–1 was proposed by Robert Huygens. That the revolt happened in 1181 and the truce signed in December 1181 was suggested by Hans Eberhard Mayer. The entire conflict probably took place from August to November 1181: Historian Michael Stone presents the text of a contemporary Antiochene Armenian-language colophon with translation to support this. The scribe of the colophon is one Yohannēs, who is favourable to Bohemond, unlike William of Tyre, who favoured the Patriarch.

== Defence of Antioch (1194) ==
In 1194, Bohemond, his family, and his court were captured at Baghrās by Leo I, King of Armenia, and imprisoned on Sis. To gain his freedom, he agreed to surrender Antioch to Leo. Bartholomew Tirel, the marshal of Antioch, and Richard de L'Erminet were sent to surrender the city to the Armenian Heṭoum of Sassoun. Aimery, at the head of the clergy, encouraged the citizens to resist the takeover and the Armenians were forced outside the walls while a commune was established that recognised the authority of Raymond IV of Tripoli until Bohemond's release. The commune then sent for aid to Henry I of Jerusalem.

== Maronite– and Armenian–Latin reunion ==
In 1181, Aimery was met by the Maronite Patriarch and some of his bishops from the Catholic dioceses of Byblos, Botrun, and Tripoli on Mount Lebanon. They formally asked for recommunion with the Catholic Church, from which the Maronites had been separated since the eighth century. Historian Bernard Hamilton disagrees with William of Tyre that it was the initiative of the Maronites that effected reconciliation and also with the seventeenth-century Maronite historian Isṭifān al-Duwayhī, who wrote that the Maronites had been in contact with Aimery since 1153 - 1159. Aimery did not live to see reunion, but he did have a part to play in reunion with the Armenian Church in 1195 and he even permitted Nerses of Lampron to preach in his churches.

== Sources ==
- Hamilton, Bernard (1984). "Ralph of Domfront, Patriarch of Antioch (1135-40)". Nottingham Medieval Studies. 28. Brepols: 1–22. doi:10.1484/J.NMS.3.115.
- Hiestand, Rudolph (1994). "An intellectual center in Northern Syria? Notes on the personality of Aimery of Antioch, Albert of Tarsus and Rorgo Fretellus". Le Moyen-Âge. 100. Le Moyen-Âge: 7–36. doi:10.1484/J.NMS.3.115.
- Tyerman, Christopher (2006). God's war: a new history of the Crusades. Penguin Books. ISBN 0674023870.
- Hamilton, Bernard (1996). "Aimery of Limoges, Latin Patriarch of Antioch (c. 1142 - c. 1196) and the unity of the Churches". In Ciggaar, Krijna (ed.). East and west in the crusader states: context, contacts, confrontations: acta of the congress held at Hernen Castle in May 1993, 1. Uitgeverij Peeters. ISBN 9789068317923.
- Runciman, Steven (3 December 1987). A History of the Crusades. CUP Archive. ISBN 978-0-521-34771-6.
- Catlos, Brian A. (2015). Infidel Kings and Unholy Warriors: Faith, Power, and Violence in the Age of Crusade and Jihad. Farrar, Straus and Giroux. ISBN 9780374535322.
- Richard, Jean (1999). The Crusades, c. 1071 - c. 1291. Cambridge University Press. ISBN 9780521625661.
- Hardwicke, Mary N. (1969). "The Crusader States, 1192-1243". In Wolf, R.L. (ed.). Volume II: The later Crusades, 1189-1311. University of Wisconsin Press.
- Stone, Michael E. (2004). "A Notice about Patriarch Aimery of Antioch in an Armenian Colophon of 1181". In Kedar, Benjamin Z.; Phillips, Jonathan; Riley-Smith, Jonathan (eds.). Crusades. Vol. 3.
- "A Notice about Patriarch Aimery of Antioch in an Armenian Colophon", Apocrypha, Pseudepigrapha and Armenian Studies: Collected Papers, II, (Peeters Publishers, 2006) p. 497 [125]

Religious titles
Preceded by Ralph of Domfront	Latin Patriarch of Antioch; 1140-1208	Succeeded by Ralph II
