= Athanasius I Manasses =

Greek Orthodox bishop (died 1170)

- Patriarch of Antioch and All the East
- Church: Church of Antioch
- In office: 1157 – 29 June 1170
- Predecessor: Soterichos Panteugenos
- Successor: Cyril II

Personal details
- Died: 29 June 1170 Antioch
- Denomination: Eastern Orthodoxy

Athanasius I Manasses (Greek: Ἀθανάσιος Μανασσῆς, romanized: Athanasios Manassēs; died 29 June 1170), also known as Athanasius III, was the Greek Orthodox patriarch of Antioch from 1157 to 1170. His early life is poorly documented, but it is known that he was a monk at the Monastery of Saint John the Theologian and composed a eulogy of Christodoulos of Patmos. He was elected patriarch in 1157 but resided in Constantinople, as the patriarchal see of Antioch had been held by Catholic prelates since the establishment of the Principality of Antioch during the First Crusade.

Athanasius's move to his see was connected with the capture of Prince Bohemond III of Antioch in battle by the Muslim ruler Nur ad-Din. Unable to raise the ransom required for his release, Bohemond sought assistance from the Byzantine emperor Manuel I Komnenos, who paid the required sum but insisted on the installation of a Greek Orthodox patriarch in Antioch. Athanasius was enthroned at the city's Cathedral of Saint Peter in 1165 or 1166. The city's Catholic patriarch, Aimery of Limoges, did not relinquish his claim to the see but withdrew to a nearby fortress. The Syriac patriarch, Michael the Syrian, also came into conflict with Athanasius. Athanasius died of injuries sustained when his cathedral collapsed during an earthquake, enabling Aimery of Limoges to reoccupy his see.

== Early life ==
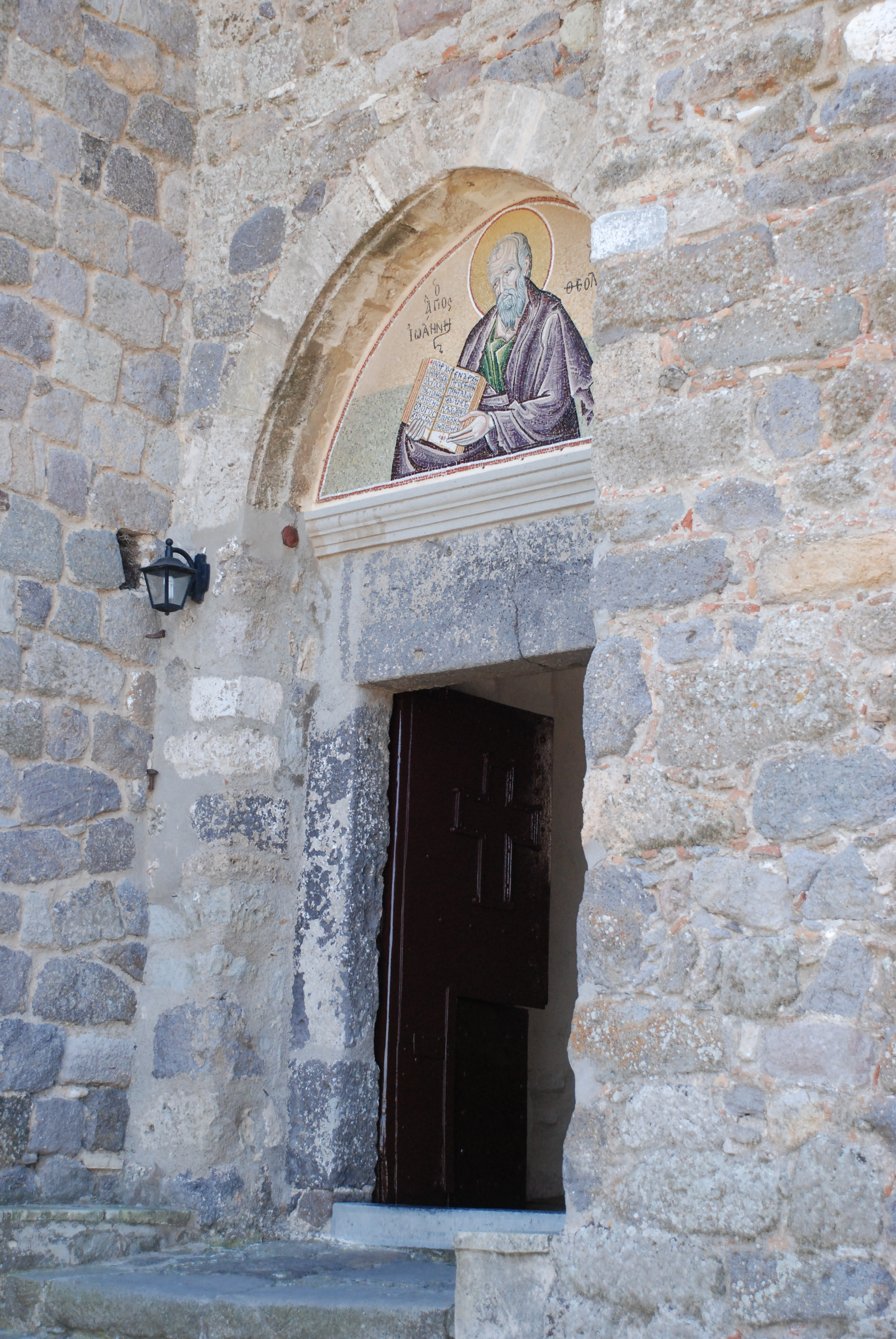
Entrance to the Monastery of Saint John the Theologian on Patmos

The origins and early life of Athanasius remain poorly documented. His family name, Manasses, is attested in synodal documents, and also in the Life of Athanasius, preserved in a manuscript at Saint Catherine's Monastery in Egypt. The name rarely appears in later records, particularly during the Palaiologan period (1261–1453). Athanasius's only surviving work, a eulogy of Christodoulos of Patmos, indicates he was a monk at the Monastery of Saint John the Theologian on the island of Patmos. In it, he states he composed the text "by command and in obedience" – most likely at his brethren's request – while away from the monastery representing its community.

== Patriarchate ==
=== Titular patriarch ===
The Orthodox patriarchs of Antioch had been absent from their see in Syria since 1100, following an armed conflict between the city's western European rulers and the Byzantines. Antioch had been conquered by Western European forces during the First Crusade, though the Byzantines continued to assert their claim to the city, which had formerly been the capital of a Byzantine province. The crusaders, widely known as Franks, installed a Catholic patriarch in Antioch, but the Byzantine emperors refused to recognize this change and continued to appoint a succession of titular Orthodox patriarchs of Antioch, who resided in Constantinople. At an uncertain date, the titular patriarchs established their residence in Constantinople's Hodegon Monastery.

Luke, the second titular patriarch, died c. 1156 and the theologian Soterichos Panteugenos was elected his successor. Synods in Constantinople condemned his teaching on the Eucharist in 1156 and 1157, and he was declared ineligible for the patriarchal throne in May 1157, before his episcopal consecration. The Byzantinist Albert Failler argues that Athanasius was most probably elected patriarch in the same year, because no other intervening incumbent is known.

In 1158, the Byzantine emperor Manuel I Komnenos led an army towards northern Syria to avenge a joint Frankish-Armenian raid on the Byzantine island of Cyprus. Alarmed by the approach of the imperial army, Raynald of Châtillon, the Frankish prince of Antioch, made a penitential journey to the Emperor's camp at Mamistra, where he accepted Byzantine suzerainty over his principality and promised to restore the Orthodox patriarch to Antioch. If Failler's conjecture concerning the year of Athanasius's appointment is correct, Athanasius was the patriarch whom Manuel intended to restore to the see of Antioch. The Emperor quickly abandoned this plan. The historian Bernard Hamilton suggests that he did so because insisting on it would have jeopardized amicable relations with the Crusader states and his alliance with the papacy, a key partner in his opposition to the Holy Roman emperor, Frederick I Barbarossa.

Christmas Day 1161 is one of the few securely attested dates in Athanasius's life. On that day, he assisted Luke Chrysoberges, Ecumenical Patriarch of Constantinople, with the nuptial blessing of Manuel and Maria of Antioch at Hagia Sophia. In March 1166, Athanasius participated in a synod convened in Constantinople to examine the meaning of Christ's words in the Gospel of John, "ho patēr mou meizōn mou estin" ('my Father is greater than I'). Failler argues that both occasions indicate Athanasius was still residing in Constantinople. Hamilton contends that Athanasius was already resident in Antioch as patriarch when he attended the synod.

=== In Antioch ===
The Crusader states c. 1165

Athanasius's accession to the patriarchal throne in Antioch resulted from political developments that strengthened Byzantine influence over the Principality of Antioch. At the Battle of Harim in August 1164, the combined forces of Bohemond III of Antioch, Raymond III of Tripoli, and Constantine Kalamanos, the Byzantine governor of Cilicia, were decisively defeated by Nur ad-Din, the Muslim ruler of Aleppo and Damascus. The three Christian leaders were captured and unable to raise the ransom demanded by Nur ad-Din. Bohemond travelled to Constantinople to seek assistance from Manuel, his brother-in-law and overlord. Manuel agreed to provide the necessary funds on condition that Bohemond consented to the restoration of the Orthodox patriarch to Antioch.

The historians Andrew D. Buck and Kevin J. Lewis date Athanasius's arrival in Antioch to 1165, whereas Failler maintains that Athanasius did not leave Constantinople until after March 1166, noting that the eastern patriarchs attended synods in Constantinople only when they were physically present in the city. Athanasius accompanied Bohemond to Antioch, where he was enthroned in the Cathedral of Saint Peter. The city's incumbent Catholic patriarch, Aimery of Limoges, withdrew to the patriarchal fortress of Qusair (now Altınözü, Turkey) and excommunicated those Catholic inhabitants of Antioch who recognized Athanasius as patriarch. These events are recorded only by the Syriac (or Jacobite) prelate Michael the Syrian, who maintained amicable relations with the Catholic clergy but distrusted the Greek Orthodox, whom he regarded as less tolerant towards the Syriac Church.

The scholar of religion Christopher MacEvitt notes Athanasius's "presence in the city was a constant reminder of Manuel's domination" of the Principality of Antioch. Pope Alexander III did not object to Athanasius's installation; Hamilton attributes this to the Pope's northern Italian allies depending heavily upon Byzantine subsidies in their opposition to Frederick Barbarossa. He also notes Athanasius neither replaced his Catholic suffragan bishops with Orthodox prelates nor removed the Catholic canons of Antioch's cathedral. Lewis argues that Orthodox prelates supplanted Catholic bishops "in a handful of other dioceses within the patriarchate", though he acknowledges there is "no definite evidence" for Orthodox bishops in any of the bishoprics of the County of Tripoli, which also lay under the jurisdiction of the patriarchs of Antioch.

Michael the Syrian undertook an extensive tour of Cilician Armenia, the Principality of Antioch, and the Kingdom of Jerusalem following his installation as the new Syriac patriarch of Antioch in 1166. During this journey, he met the Catholic patriarch of Jerusalem, Amalric of Nesle, and the exiled Patriarch Aimery, but firmly declined to visit Athanasius. In 1168, a prolonged controversy arose between the Greek and Syriac clergy, attested by extensive correspondence that continued until 1171. The correspondence stemmed from Emperor Manuel's ultimately unsuccessful attempt to strengthen his position as protector of the Christians of northern Syria by securing a reconciliation with the Syriac and Armenian Churches under the leadership of the Orthodox Church.

== Death ==
In June 1170, the Near East was struck by an earthquake. Two medieval sources, the Gestes des Chyprois and the chronicle attributed to Sempad the Constable, state it struck Antioch on 29 June, the feast day of St Peter and St Paul. Two Syriac authors, Michael the Syrian and Bar Hebraeus, record the earthquake destroyed "the great church of the Greeks" (the Cathedral of St Peter). Michael further relates that the building collapsed on Athanasius, who was found alive but died while being carried out of the city. The Franks of Antioch interpreted Athanasius's death as a manifestation of divine wrath, and the exiled Catholic patriarch resumed his position. Michael the Syrian recounts that Bohemond III of Antioch travelled to Qusair to personally persuade Patriarch Aimery to return. Athanasius's successor as Orthodox patriarch of Antioch, Cyrill II, never visited his see and remained in Constantinople throughout his tenure.

== Bibliography ==
- Buck, Andrew D. (2017). The Principality of Antioch and its Frontiers in the Twelfth Century. The Boydell Press. ISBN 978-1-78327-173-3.
- Failler, Albert (1993). "Le patriarche d'Antioche Athanase Ier Manassès (1157-1170)" [The Patriarch of Antioch, Athanasius I Manasses (1157–1170)]. Revue des études byzantines (in French). 51: 63–75. doi:10.3406/rebyz.1993.1869. ISSN 0766-5598.
- Hamilton, Bernard (1980). The Latin Church in the Crusader States: The Secular Church. Variorum Publications. ISBN 978-0-86078-072-4. Archived from the original on 12 April 2023.
- Lewis, Kevin James (2017). The Counts of Tripoli and Lebanon in the Twelfth Century: Sons of Saint-Gilles. Rulers of the Latin East. Routledge. ISBN 978-1-4724-5890-2. Archived from the original on 22 February 2023.
- Lock, Peter (2006). The Routledge Companion to the Crusades. Routledge Companion to History. Routledge. ISBN 978-0-4153-9312-6.
- MacEvitt, Christopher (2008). The Crusades and the Christian World of the East: Rough Tolerance. The Middle Ages. University of Pennsylvania Press. ISBN 978-0-8122-2083-4. Archived from the original on 3 May 2023.
