= Rainald Masoir =

Rainald Masoir (or le Mazoir) may refer to:

- Rainald I Masoir (died c. 1135), lord of Margat and constable of Antioch
- Rainald II Masoir (died c. 1185), lord of Margat
