= 1170 Syria earthquake =

Extreme level earthquake in Syria

- Location within Syria
- Local date: 29 June 1170
- Local time: Early morning
- Magnitude: 7.7 M_{w}
- Epicenter: 35.1°N 36.5°E
- Fault: Missyaf Fault
- Areas affected: Syria (region)
- Total damage: Extreme
- Max. intensity: MMI X (Extreme)
- Casualties: ~80,000 dead

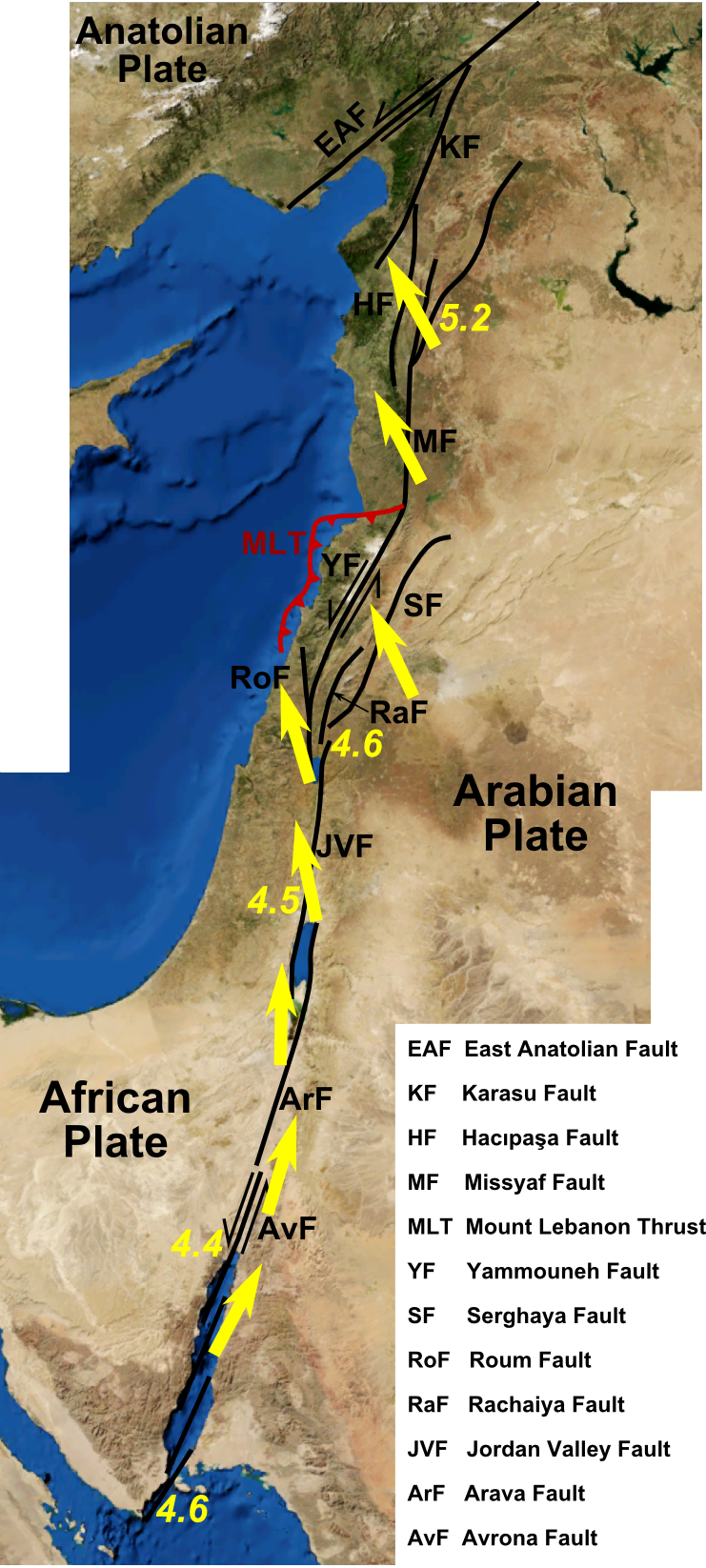
Map of the Dead Sea Transform showing the main fault segments and motion of the Arabian plate relative to the African plate, from GPS data

One of the largest earthquakes to hit Syria occurred early in the morning of 29 June 1170. It formed part of a sequence of large earthquakes that propagated southwards along the Dead Sea Transform, starting with the 1138 Aleppo earthquake, continuing with the 1157 Hama, 1170 and 1202 Syria events. The estimated magnitude is 7.7 on the moment magnitude scale, with the maximum intensity of X (Extreme) on the Mercalli intensity scale.

== Tectonic setting ==
Western Syria lies across the boundary between the African plate and the Arabian plate, which consists of the various segments of the Dead Sea Transform. The main strand passing through the Lebanon restraining bend is the Yammouneh Fault, which was responsible for the 1202 earthquake. To the north of this is the Missyaf Fault (or Ghab Fault), which continues up to the Ghab basin. One earlier earthquake has been identified on this fault segment, the 115 Antioch earthquake. The Missyaf Fault is considered the most likely structure responsible for the 1170 event. The lack of any later major earthquakes on this segment suggests that one is now overdue.

== Earthquake ==
Due to the size of the area affected and the damage it caused, this earthquake is recorded in many contemporary accounts and appears in many more recent catalogues. There has been some confusion over the date, but there is a consensus now that it occurred on 29 June 1170. There is some uncertainty over the location of the epicentre and even whether it was two shocks or just one. The most likely location is on the Missraf segment of the Dead Sea Transform and the single earthquake appears most consistent with contemporary accounts. This implies a large area with high intensity of shaking and this has been used to suggest that the rupture was about 126 km long, involving more than just the Missraf segment, and that the magnitude was about 7.7 M_{w}.

Several foreshocks were reported and the aftershocks sequence lasted for three months.

== Damage ==
Severe damage was widespread from Antioch in the north to Tripoli and Baalbek in the south. Several places that had been badly damaged by the 1157 Hama earthquake, suffered again, such as Hama, Aleppo and Antioch. The death toll was estimated at 80,000.

In Antioch, the earthquake destroyed the sanctuary of the Cathedral of Saint Peter, where Patriarch Athanasius I was conducting liturgy. He was pulled out alive, but died soon after. The walls along the banks of the Orontes and several churches in Antioch were also destroyed. Prince Bohemond III was deeply affected: he cut his hair and dressed in sackcloth. The shield of castles which Count Raymond II of Tripoli had given to the Knights Hospitaller and Knights Templar was destroyed. These included Crac des Chevaliers, Chastel Blanc and al-‘Arimah. The Cathedral of Saint Mary was also destroyed.
