= Battle of al-Buqaia =

Battle fought between Zengids and a combined army of Crusaders

Coordinates: 34°39′48″N 36°19′59″E

- Part of the Crusades
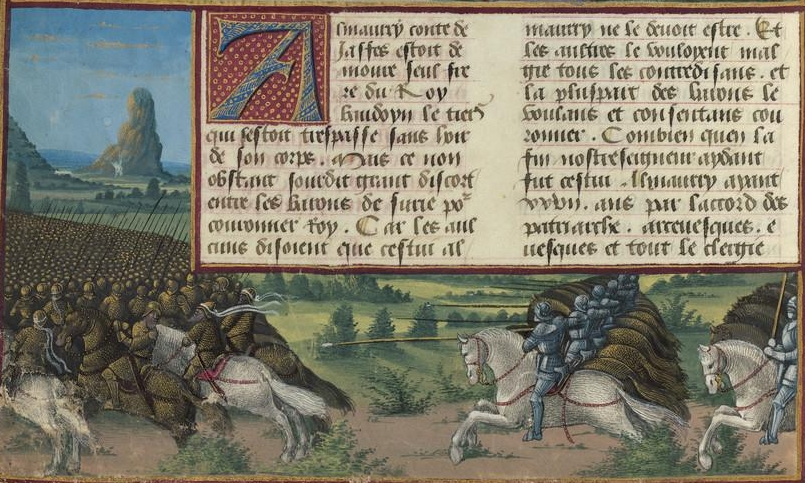
- Battle of al-Buqaia, miniature by Jean Colombe from Sébastien Mamerot's book "Passages d'outremer" (1474)
Date	1163
Location	Al-Buqaia near Beqaa Valley, County of Tripoli (modern-day Akkar District, Lebanon)
Result	Byzantine-Crusader victory

Belligerents
Kingdom of Jerusalem; Byzantine Empire; Principality of Antioch; County of Tripoli	Zengids

Commanders and leaders
Amalric I of Jerusalem; Gilbert de Lacy; Konstantinos Kalamanos; Bohemund III of Antioch; Raymond III of Tripoli; Hugh VIII of Lusignan	Nur ad-Din Zangi

Strength
Unknown	Unknown

Casualties and losses
Unknown	Unknown

In the Battle of al-Buqaia in 1163, the Crusaders and their allies inflicted a rare defeat on Nur ad-Din Zangi, the Emir of Aleppo and Damascus. King Amalric I led the army of the Kingdom of Jerusalem, together with contingents from the northern Latin states, a substantial body of pilgrims who had just arrived from France, and a force brought by the Byzantine governor of Cilicia. For the Christian forces, this victory only gave a brief respite from the sustained Muslim offensive.

== Background ==
Nur ad-Din proved to be one of the most dangerous enemies the Frankish kingdom had ever faced. Starting out as Emir of Aleppo, he steadily increased his territory at the expense of his Muslim and Latin neighbors, until he gained the great city of Damascus in 1154. He seriously defeated the Crusaders at the Battle of Lake Huleh in 1157, but fell very ill immediately afterward. This event allowed the Franks a chance to recover and, with the help of Thierry of Alsace and an army of pilgrims, to capture Harim castle later in the year. However, an attack on Shaizar failed when Reynald of Châtillon, the Prince of Antioch, quarreled with the other Franks. Consequently, Shaizar soon became the property of Nur ad-Din. In 1158, Thierry and King Baldwin III beat Nur ad-Din at the battle of Butaiha, northeast of Tiberias. The year 1160 saw the capture of Reynald, who spent the next 16 years in Nur ad-Din's dungeons. In December 1161, the Byzantine Emperor Manuel I Comnenus married Maria of Antioch and this event gave Antioch a strong protector in the emperor.

Both Amalric and Nur ad-Din soon became aware of the weakness of Fatimid Egypt, whose government had fallen into a state of decay. After the assassination of Caliph al-Zafir and a series of palace coups, Shawar seized power in 1162, was soon deposed, and appealed to Nur ad-Din for help. Neither the Latin king nor the Muslim emir could afford to let the other capture the rich prize of Egypt. Accordingly, Nur ad-Din sent his lieutenant Shirkuh with an army to support the Egyptian vizier.

== Battle ==
While Shirkuh campaigned in Egypt, Nur ad-Din mounted an offensive in Lebanon. Following Latin policy, King Amalric took an army to support his northern vassals, Bohemund III of Antioch and Raymond III of Tripoli. Fortuitously, a large group of French pilgrims led by Hugh VIII of Lusignan and Geoffrey Martel, the brother of William IV of Angoulême, joined the king of Jerusalem. In addition, Konstantinos Kalamanos, the governor of Cilicia brought his Greek warriors to assist the Crusaders. Nur ad-Din was no match for such a formidable combination of enemies and his army suffered a defeat near al-Buqaia (located between Krak des Chevaliers and Beqaa Valley, in modern-day Akkar District, Lebanon). Both Muslims and Franks were impressed by the fighting qualities of the Byzantine soldiers. The negative result of al-Buqaia only made Nur ad-Din more keen for revenge.

== Aftermath ==
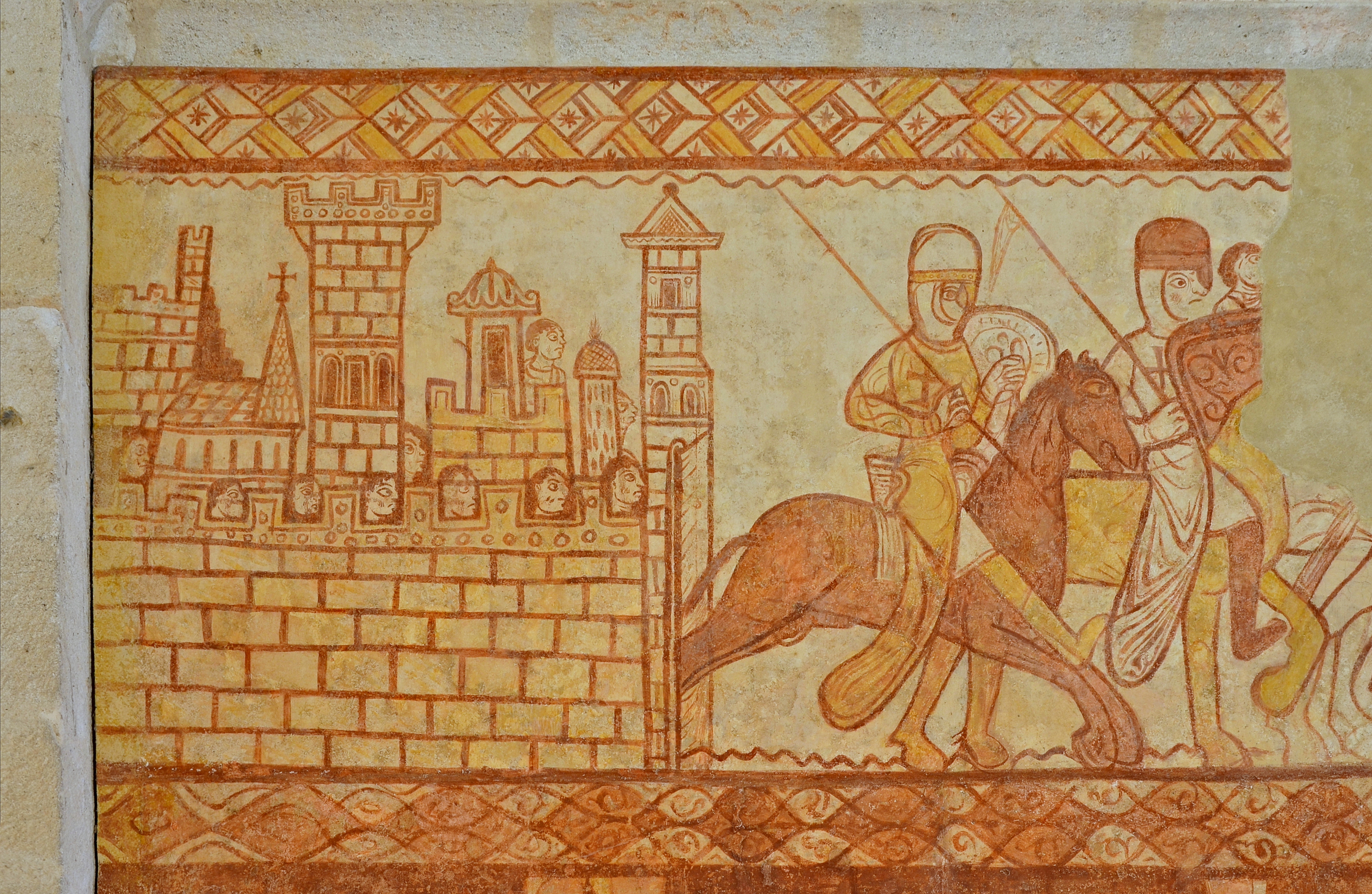
Knights Templar returning from the Battle of al-Buqaia. A fresco from the Templar Chapel in Cressac-Saint-Genis, France

Believing his northern front secure, Amalric took his army to Egypt. He found himself in a three-way contest between his Franks, Shirkuh, and Shawar, with the latter trying to maintain Egyptian independence. Amalric ousted Shirkuh from Egypt in 1164, but the king had to rapidly abandon Egypt upon the news of a great disaster in the north. The next major encounter would be the Battle of Harim.

== Bibliography ==
- Larkin, Peter (2015). Richard Coer de Lyon. ISD LLC. ISBN 9781580442404.
- Oldenbourg, Zoé (1966). The Crusades. New York: Pantheon Books.
- Phillips, Jonathan (2019). The Life and Legend of the Sultan Saladin. Yale University Press. ISBN 9780300247060.
- Smail, R. C. (1995). Crusading Warfare 1097-1193. New York: Barnes & Noble Books. ISBN 1-56619-769-4.
