= Sibylla of Antioch =

Sibylla of Antioch may refer to:

- Sibylla (wife of Bohemond III), princess of Antioch from 1180
- Sibylla of Armenia, princess of Antioch (1254–1275) as the wife of Bohemond VI
