= Battle of Harem =

Battle fought during the Syrian Civil War

- Part of Idlib Governorate clashes (June 2012–April 2013) of the Syrian Civil War
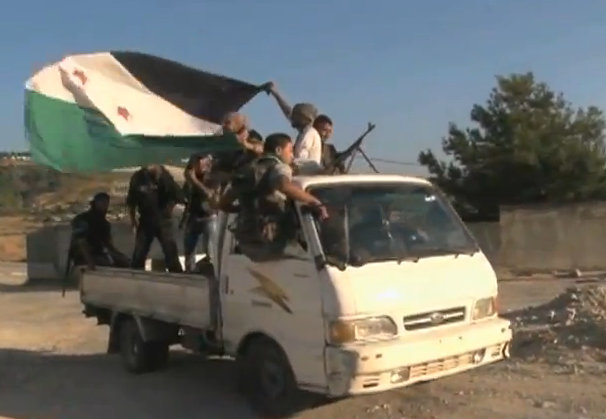
- FSA soldiers on a truck
Date	17 October – 24 December 2012 (2 months and 1 week)
Location	Harem, Syria
Result	Rebel victory

Belligerents
(Syria) Syrian Arab Republic; Syrian Armed Forces; Syrian Arab Army; Syrian Arab Air Force; (Syria) Public Security Police; Local Police; Shabiha	Syrian National Coalition; Free Syrian Army; Joint Military Councils

Commanders and leaders
(Syria) Local Shabiha commander †	Cmdr. Basil Eissa † (Commander of the Idlib Martyrs' Brigade); Cmdr. Mohaned Eissa; Abu Said (Commander of Al-Haq Brigade); Maj. Abu Osama (Army defector); Maj. Mohammed al-Ali (Army defector)

Units involved
Infantry Border Guard Brigade; 99th Army Regiment; 111th Army Regiment	Idlib Martyrs' Brigade Sihem al-Haq Brigade

Strength
600 soldiers and militiamen	500 FSA fighters

Casualties and losses
78 killed, 230+ captured	43 killed

The Battle of Harem was fought between the FSA and the Syrian Army, from the 17 October to the 25 December 2012. The fight occurred during the Idlib Governorate clashes (June 2012–April 2013) of the Syrian Civil War.

By the end of the battle, the town had been captured by the rebels.

== Battle ==
The first time rebel forces launched a major attack against the town was on 2 September 2012. The fighting continued the whole next day as well. On that occasion, rebels took control of six of the seven roads leading into Harem and killed a pro-government militia commander. They also burned a dozen homes of suspected militia members in the town, in retaliation for the burning of the houses in their villages.

On 17 October, the rebels launched an offensive to capture the town of Harem, which dominates a strategic route to the city of Aleppo. Harem was also seen as a possible new rebel supply route from Turkey.

By the end of October, 4,000 civilians, along with pro-government militias, had taken refuge in the old fortress and were in fear of a massacre if the opposition started to bombard the castle. Dozens of wounded Syrian soldiers died of their injuries due to the shortage of supplies, while wounded rebel fighters were transported across the border to Turkey in ambulances. Rebel units withdrew to the edges of the town, while holding on to some parts inside Harem, after an attack on the local headquarters of the political security section was repelled by security forces and Army units that were sent from Salqeen as reinforcements. Dozens of people, including civilians, were killed. During the fighting for the town, government Sukhoi-22 jets were bombarding rebel positions, with an 80 percent hit-rate.

On 2 November, a series of government air-strikes on Harem reportedly left 70 people dead.

At this time, a video emerged, filmed by a Reuters crew, of rebel fighters gunning down an unarmed man in a dusty alley. Rebels claimed he was a loyalist Army officer, but even so the killing was viewed as proof of both sides committing war crimes. The Reuters crew also saw the bodies of four uniformed soldiers lined up in a garden, all shot in the head. And, although dozens of prisoners were held by rebels in the town, at least one fighter described commanders' calls for fair treatment as a smokescreen to keep the killings hidden.

By 4 November, rebels were reportedly in control of the city center, while fighting was still ongoing at the citadel.

On 5 November, Syrian warplanes attacked rebel positions around Harem, resulting in the deaths of 20 rebel fighters, including the brigade commander Basil Eissa. In response to the air-strike, rebels bombarded the al-Tarem neighborhood which is considered as a pro-government stronghold.

Late on 24 December, rebels fully captured Harem after the 30 remaining government troops at the historic citadel surrendered.

The town was subjugated to continuing government air-strikes for months after the rebels captured it.
