= Bourzey castle =

Castle ruin in Shathah District, Syria

- Shathah Subdistrict, Syria
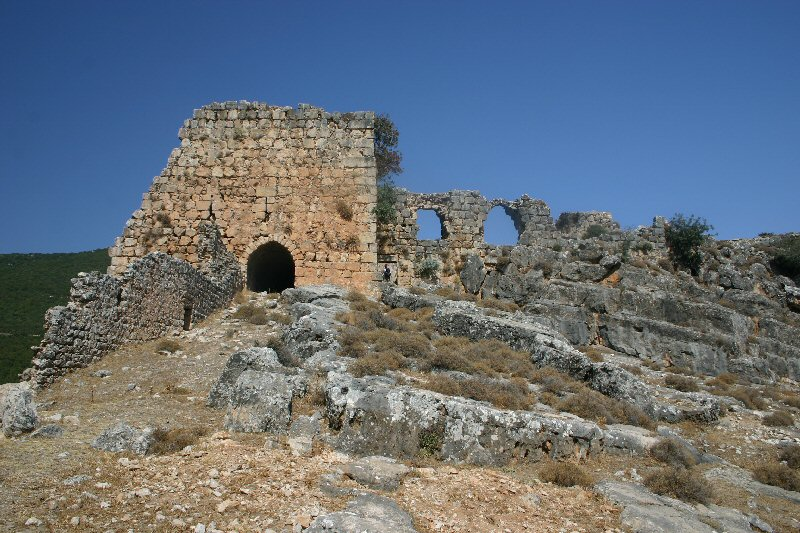
- A gateway to the main Bourzey Castle

Site information
- Type: Castle
- Condition: Ruins

Location
- Coordinates: 35°39′29″N 36°15′39″E

Bourzey (Note: Also known as Bourzo, Borzé, Borzeih, or Barzuya, which might be derived from برج - burc meaning tower.) castle, also known as Mirza castle (Arabic: قلعة ميرزا), is located at the border of Syria coastal mountains and Ghab valley, 25 km away from Jisr al-Shughur, at altitude 450 m. The inscriptions and mentioning of the castle relate it to the Byzantine era in the 11th century. Architecturally, it has a triangular shape. The western façade is 175 m, the eastern is 50 m. The southern and eastern façades are adjacent to deep gorges, but the western façade is the least steep. There are 21 towers and a small church on the surface.

== History ==
From the Seleucid era, the castle's hill played a role under the ancient name "Lysias" to secure the connection between the cities of Laodicea and Apamea. In 65 BC, Roman general, Pompey, controlled the region. Later on, the Byzantines built the castle on the hill. In 948/9, the commander Abu al-Hagar controlled the castle on behalf of the emir of Aleppo, Sayf al-Dawla.

In 975, the Byzantine Emperor, John I Tzimiskes recaptured the castle from the Hamdanids. After the Battle of Mantzikert in 1071, the Muslims again gained the upper hand in northern Syria. Aq Sunqur al-Hajib, Seljuk governor of Aleppo, took possession of the castle in May 1090. About 1103, the crusaders from the Principality of Antioch controlled the castle, during the reign of Bohemond I, and it was called "Rochefort".

On August 23, 1188, Saladin took the castle after a three-day siege in his campaign after the Battle of Hattin. The lord of the castle's wife was sister to Sibylla, the third wife of Bohemond III, and because of this Bourzey's lord and the seventeen members of his family were allowed to flee to Antioch. Ibn al-Athir claimed that the castle's lady was also an informant for Saladin, which is why the family was spared.

== Structure ==
After Byzantine rule the castle passed to Ayyubids, who built additional towers in Arabic style. Mamelouks came later to fortify the southern towers. However, based on comparisons in construction technology and style, it can be determined that the systems that still exist today were built by the crusaders in the first phase of castle construction (1100–1140).

The castle has several arrow bastions, underground rooms, water reservoirs. The road to the castle ends at the western slope. One needs climbing the mountain (~100 m) to reach the castle.

== See also ==
- List of castles in Syria
- Areimeh Castle

== Sources ==
- Official site of Hama governorate - Syria
