= Sibylla (wife of Bohemond III) =

Medieval noblewoman

Princess of Antioch
- Spouse: Bohemond III of Antioch
- Issue: Alice of Antioch

Sibylla (Old French: Sibyl, fl. 1180) was a princess of Antioch and the third wife of Bohemond III of Antioch. Born to a noble family, she would develop a poor reputation in Antioch before her incredibly controversial marriage to Bohemond, which later resulted in his excommunication. Throughout her time as the princess of Antioch, Sibylla exercised much influence on her husband through her ties to the Armenian nobility.

== Life ==
=== Early life and reputation ===
Virtually no record of Sibylla’s early life exists, but she is known to have been an Antiochene lady of notable status. She was presumably connected to Bohemond III of Antioch through her sister’s marriage to the Lord of Burzey, one of Bohemond’s vassals; the contemporary Arabic historian Ibn al-Athir states that this sister was "in correspondence with Saladin and exchanged gifts with him." How Sibylla grew to know Bohemond and subsequently became his third wife is not known.

=== Marriage and conflict ===
To strengthen his alliance with the Byzantine Empire, Bohemond III of Antioch married his second wife, Theodora Komnene, a grandniece of Manuel I Komnenos, in 1177. However, when Emperor Manuel died on September 24, 1180, Bohemond repudiated Theodora and immediately married Sibylla. Sibylla was the target of harsh criticisms from contemporary chroniclers, and was highly unpopular amongst powerful members of the church. Archbishop William of Tyre described Sibylla as a witch who “practised evil magics” to seduce Bohemond, and Patriarch Michael the Syrian described her as a "prostitute". The opposition against Bohemond's marriage to Sibylla was led by Aimery of Limoges, the Latin Patriarch of Antioch who had amassed much support from influential nobles, but whether these men had political reasons for condemning Sibylla along with their personal issues is not known.

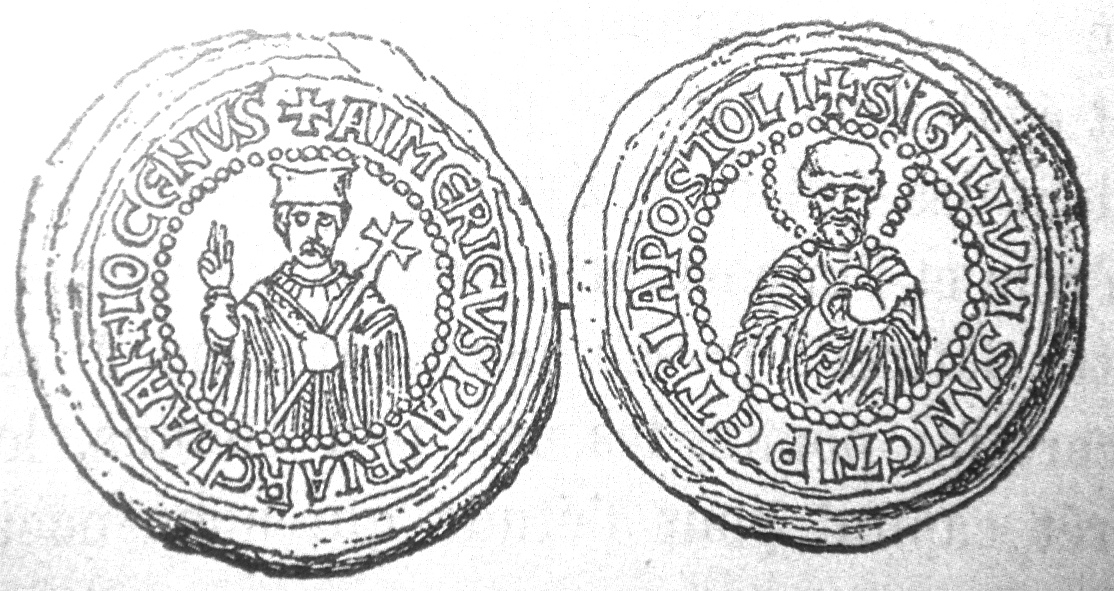
Coin of the Latin Patriarch of Antioch Aimery of Limoges (1139-1193), with bust of Aimery on the obverse

As Bohemond's lawful wife, Theodora, was still alive at this time, Patriarch Aimery accused Bohemond of adultery and excommunicated him on the orders of Pope Alexander III. This escalated into a conflict rather quickly, and after Bohemond confiscated church property, Aimery placed Antioch under interdict and fled to his fortress in al-Quṣayr. Bohemond besieged him shortly after this, but the prince was met with opposition from various nobles who supported the patriarch; Aimery himself even instigated rioting against Bohemond’s rule.

Baldwin IV of Jerusalem eventually sent Heraclius, the Latin Patriarch of Jerusalem, along with other bishops and nobles including Bohemond’s former stepfather Raynald of Châtillon, to mediate. Following negotiations, Bohemond and Aimery eventually met in Antioch, and an agreement was reached: Bohemond would restore the church property he had confiscated, and Aimery would subsequently lift the interdict on Antioch. However, Bohemond notably refused to return to Theodora, remaining with Sibylla instead, and his excommunication remained in place.

=== Bohemond's capture ===
Sibylla’s activities over the next ten years and during the Third Crusade are unknown, but she and Bohemond had two children during this time: William and Alice. Sibylla hoped to secure Antioch for her son with the assistance of Leo of Cilicia, a long-time rival of Bohemond’s who was married to her niece, Isabel. Leo invited Bohemond, Sibylla, and their family to Bagras, a Templar fortress captured by Leo during the Third Crusade, to negotiate surrendering it either back to the Knights Templar or to Antioch. However, this meeting was a trap; Bohemond was captured and sent to Sis, the capital city of the Armenian Kingdom of Cilicia.

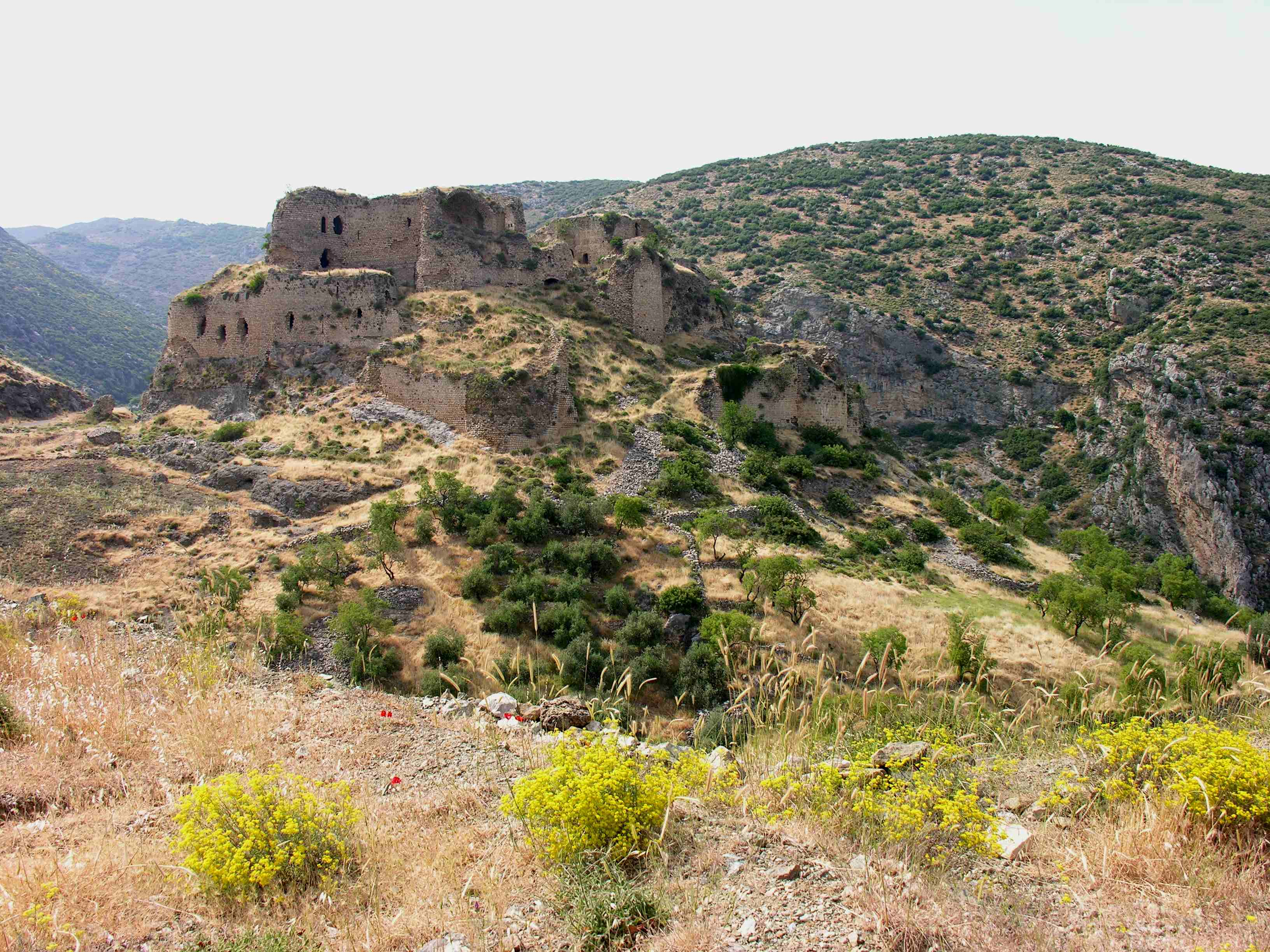
The ruins of Bagras castle

Bohemond was inclined to surrender Antioch to Leo and appointed his marshal, Bartholomew Tirel, to accompany the Armenian troops. While the Antiochene noblemen allowed Leo's soldiers to enter the principality, the Greek and Latin burghers opposed Armenian rule. The Armenians were forced to withdraw from the town, and the burghers formed a Commune which declared Bohemond's eldest son, Raymond, regent for his father. Henry I of Jerusalem came to mediate a peace treaty in 1195, and after Bohemond renounced his claim to suzerainty over Cilicia and respected Leo's possession of Bagras, the prince and his retainers were released.

== Death and identity ==
It is unknown when Sibylla died, but Bohemond went on to marry his fourth wife, Isabella of Farabel, before or in 1199 when their son, Bohemond of Botron, was born. While it could be reasonably assumed that Sibylla died before this time, some historians have argued that Sibylla and Isabella are one and the same.

Bohemond and Sibylla's daughter, Alice, went on to marry the wealthy Guy I Embriaco, with whom she had issue. Little is known about their son, William, but he could have been named after William II of Sicily.

== Sources ==
- Hamilton, Bernard (2000). The Leper King and His Heirs: Baldwin IV and the Crusader Kingdom of Jerusalem. Cambridge University Press. ISBN 978-0-521-64187-6.
- Barber, Malcolm (2012). The Crusader States. Yale University Press. ISBN 978-0-300-11312-9.
- Runciman, Steven (1989). A History of the Crusades, Volume III: The Kingdom of Acre and the Later Crusades. Cambridge University Press. ISBN 0-521-06163-6.
- Burgtorf, Jochen (2016). "The Antiochene war of succession". In Boas, Adrian J. (ed.). The Crusader World. The University of Wisconsin Press. pp. 196–211. ISBN 978-0-415-82494-1.
- Hodgson, Natasha (2011). "Conflict and cohabitation: marriage and diplomacy between Latins and Cilician Armenians, c. 1097-1253". In Kostick, Conor (ed.). The Crusades and the Near East: Cultural Histories. Routledge. pp. 83–106. ISBN 978-0-415-58040-3.
