= Theodora Komnene, Princess of Antioch =

Theodora Komnene (fl. 1140) was a grandniece of Manuel I Komnenos, Byzantine emperor, a possible daughter of John Komnenos and the second wife of Bohemond III, prince of Antioch.

She was the mother of :

- Constance (died young)
- Philippe, married Baudouin Patriarch
- Manuel (1176 † 1211)

Her granduncle Manuel I Komnenos died in 1180. Therefore, Bohemond believed that the alliance with Byzantium wouldn't be beneficial anymore and divorced Theodora.

Theodora then remarried to Walter of Béthune, son of the lord of Bethsan.
