= Harem, Syria =

Harem حَارِم
- City
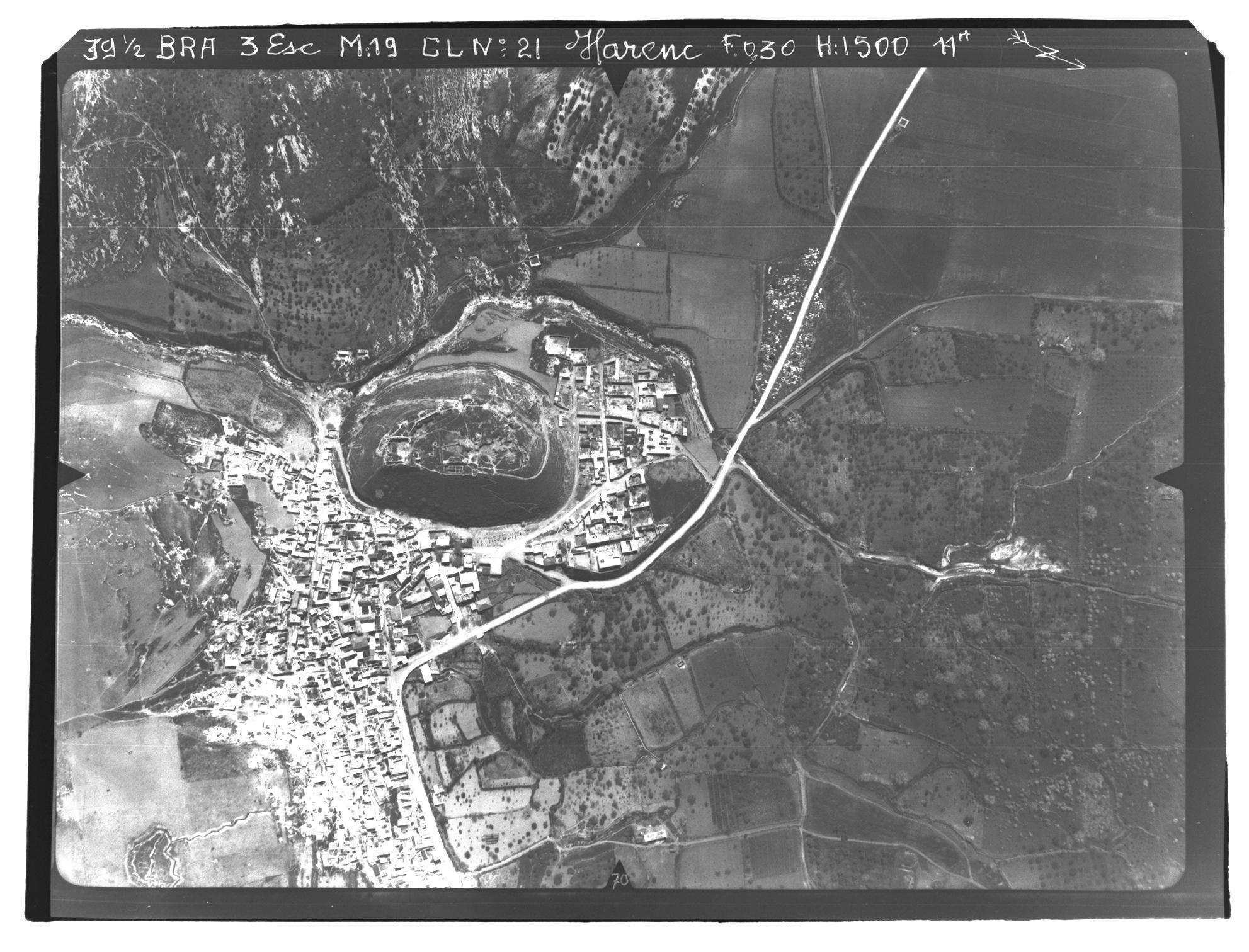
- 1930 aerial view of Harem and its castle

- Location in Syria
- Coordinates: 36°12′N 36°31′E
- Country: Syria
- Governorate: Idlib
- District: Harem (district)
- Subdistrict: Harem (subdistrict)
- Elevation: 175 m (574 ft)

Population (2008)
  - Total: 21,934

Harem or Harim (Arabic: حَارِم, romanized: Ḥārim, also Ḥāram), is a Syrian city within the Idlib Governorate. It has an altitude of 160 meters and a population of 21,934. Harem is situated in northwestern Syria on the border with Turkey, 55 km west of Aleppo.

== History ==
The city lies along the route between Antioch and Aleppo, and has existed since the Byzantine era.

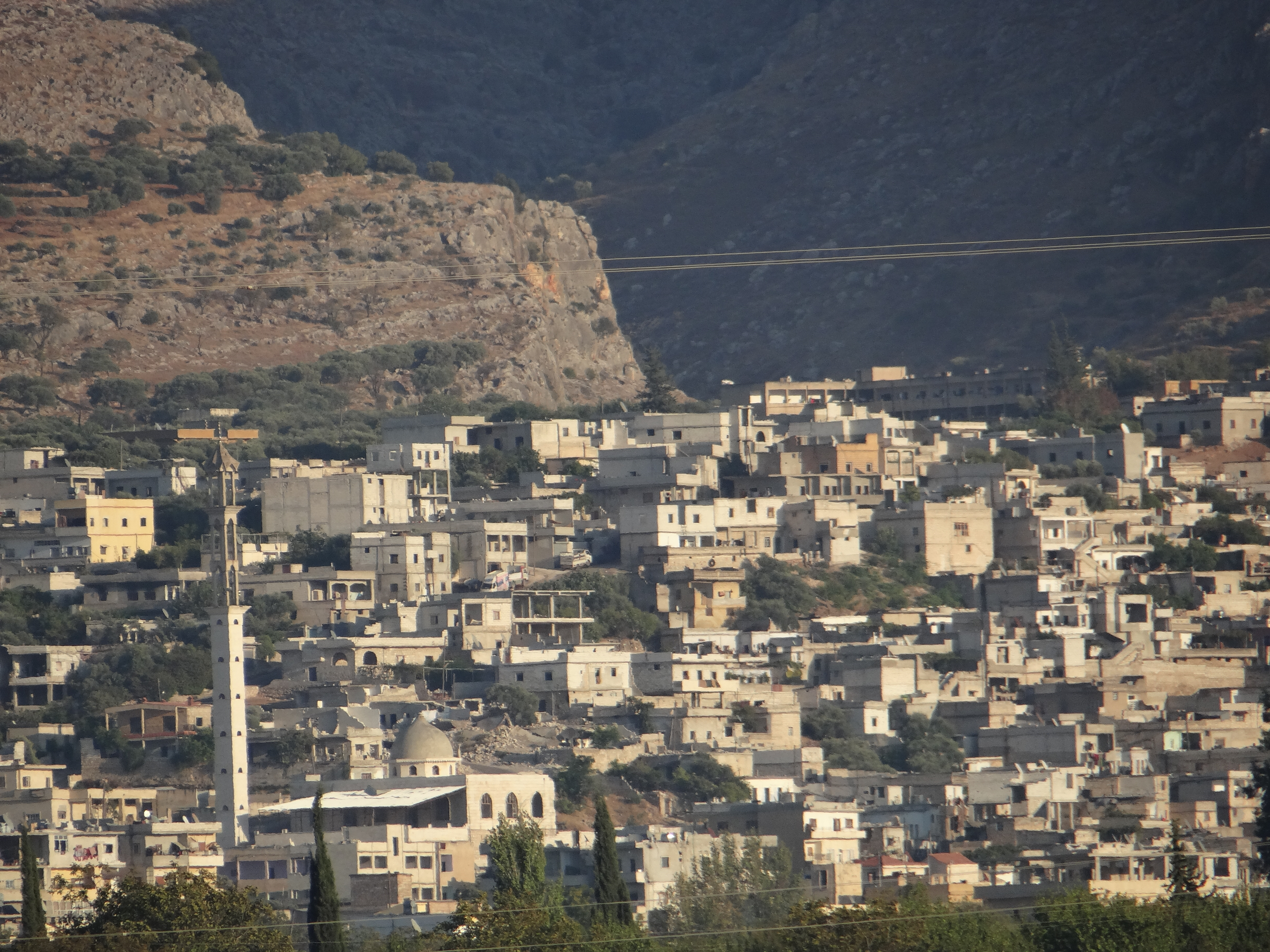
The view of Harem

=== Harem Castle: Byzantines to Seljuks ===
There is an important castle in Harem built in a unique military style. The castle was originally Byzantine and was built by Nikephoros II Phokas shortly after 959, it then fell to the Arabs and then to the Seljuk Turks.

=== Crusaders, Zengids and Ayyubids ===
In 1097, it was taken by the Crusaders, who kept it for the next forty years, except for a short time in 1098 when it was taken by the Muslim Arabs. The city stands on the northern spur of the Jebel Talat, which forms the east bank of the Orontes with superb views of the Iron Bridge and the Antioch-Aleppo road, making it a high-value position of strategic interest. After Nur al-Din's victory over Raymond of Poitiers at the Battle of Inab, the castle fell to Muslim forces in 1149. It was taken back by the Crusaders under Baldwin III in 1158. However, Nur al-Din besieged the castle once more in 1164. When the Crusaders attempted to relieve the siege, Nur al-Din defeated them decisively at the Battle of Harim, capturing many of the Christian leadership including Raymond III of Tripoli, Bohemond III of Antioch, Hugh VIII of Lusignan, and Joscelin III of Edessa. After this, the castle remained in Muslim hands for the remainder of the Crusader period, though Count Philip I of Flanders unsuccessfully attempted to recapture it one last time during his pilgrimage to the east in 1177. The Crusader castle was rebuilt by the son of Saladin, Malik Al Zaher Ghazi.

=== Mongol destruction ===
When the Mongols led by Hulagu Khan invaded in 1260, much of Harem was destroyed including its castle, and its population was massacred. What is left of the castle dates back to the Muslim-Crusader wars between 1164 and 1268.

=== 19th and 20th centuries ===
In the early 1800s, the Barmada family rebuild Harem after it was completely destroyed by the Mongols in the 13th century.

The landlords of Harem between the 1800s until 1963 belonged to four main families: Barmada, Kayali, Al-Kikhia and Hananu.

In 1980, the Syrian government confiscated all the properties and lands of Barmada family.

=== Syrian Civil War ===
During the Syrian Civil War, the town remained loyal to the Syrian government led by Bashar al-Assad before surrendering to the Free Syrian Army in a two-month long battle in late 2012. By late 2014, Harem had become the local headquarters for the al-Qaeda affiliate al-Nusra Front.

On 23 October 2025, a ceasefire was agreed between the Syrian Armed Forces and Firqat al-Ghuraba, after the latter's camp was sieged the day before in the city.

=== 2023 Earthquake ===
In early February 2023, an earthquake devastated southern Turkey and adjacent Northern Syria. Harem was particularly hard-hit, with hundreds killed, and received little to no international aid.

== Climate ==
Due to Harem being very close to Aleppo, the climate is very similar. Below is the climate table for Aleppo, because there is no climate data concerning Harem.

Climate data for Aleppo
Month	Jan	Feb	Mar	Apr	May	Jun	Jul	Aug	Sep	Oct	Nov	Dec	Year
Mean daily maximum °C (°F)	10 (50)	13 (55)	18 (64)	24 (75)	29 (84)	34 (93)	36 (97)	36 (97)	33 (91)	27 (81)	19 (66)	12 (54)	24 (76)
Mean daily minimum °C (°F)	1 (34)	3 (37)	4 (39)	9 (48)	13 (55)	17 (63)	21 (70)	21 (70)	16 (61)	12 (54)	7 (45)	3 (37)	11 (51)
Average rainy days	11	10	7	4	2	0	0	0	0	4	8	10	56
Mean monthly sunshine hours	124	168	217	240	341	390	403	372	330	279	210	124	3,198
Source: BBC Weather

== See also ==
- 1138 Aleppo earthquake
- List of castles in Syria

== Bibliography ==
- Runciman, Steven (1987). A History of the Crusades: Volume 3, The Kingdom of Acre and the Later Crusades. Cambridge University Press. ISBN 9780521347723.
