= Bohemond III of Antioch =

Prince of Antioch from 1163 to 1201

Bohemond III
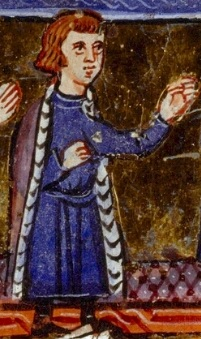
- Bohemond in Jerusalem

Prince of Antioch
- Reign: 1163–1201
- Predecessor: Constance
- Successor: Bohemond IV
- Born: c. 1148
- Died: April 1201 (aged 52–53)
- Spouse: Orgueilleuse of Harenc; Theodora Komnene; Sibylla; Isabella of Farabel
- Issue: Raymond IV of Tripoli; Bohemond IV of Antioch; Bohemond of Botron
- House: House of Poitiers
- Father: Raymond of Poitiers
- Mother: Constance of Antioch
- Religion: Catholicism

Bohemond III, also known as Bohemond the Child or the Stammerer (French: Bohémond le Bambe/le Baube; c. 1148–1201), was Prince of Antioch from 1163 to 1201. He ascended to the throne after the Antiochene noblemen dethroned his mother, Constance. He fell into captivity in the Battle of Harim in 1164, but the victorious Nur al-Din Zengi, atabeg (governor) of Aleppo released him to avoid coming into conflict with the Byzantine Empire. Bohemond went to Constantinople to pay homage to Manuel I Komnenos, who persuaded him to install a Greek Orthodox patriarch in Antioch. The Latin patriarch of Antioch, Aimery of Limoges, placed Antioch under interdict. Bohemond restored Aimery only after the Greek patriarch died during an earthquake in 1170.

Bohemond remained a close ally of the Byzantine Empire. He fought against the new lord of Armenian Cilicia, Mleh, assisting in the restoration of Byzantine rule in the Cilician plain. He also made alliances with the Muslim rulers of Aleppo and Damascus against Saladin, who had begun to unite the Muslim countries along the borders of the crusader states. Since Bohemond repudiated his second wife and married an Antiochene lady, Patriarch Aimery excommunicated him in 1180.

Bohemond forced the Armenian rulers of Cilicia to accept his suzerainty in the late 1180s. He also secured the County of Tripoli for his second son, Bohemond, in 1187. However, Saladin occupied almost the whole Principality of Antioch in the summer of 1188. To preserve the peace with Saladin, Bohemond did not provide military assistance to the crusaders during the Third Crusade. The expansionist policy of King Leo I of Armenia in the 1190s gave rise to a lasting conflict between Antioch and Cilicia. Bohemond was captured in 1194 by Leo, who tried to seize Antioch, but the burghers formed the Commune of Antioch and expelled the Armenian soldiers from the town. Bohemond was released only after he acknowledged Leo's independence.

New conflicts emerged after Bohemond's eldest son, Raymond, died in 1197. Raymond's widow, who was Leo's niece, gave birth to a posthumous son, Raymond-Roupen, but Bohemond's younger son, Bohemond of Tripoli, wanted to secure his succession in Antioch with the assistance of the commune. Bohemond III seems to have supported his son during his last years. The War of the Antiochene Succession began with Bohemond's death and lasted until 1219.

== Early life ==
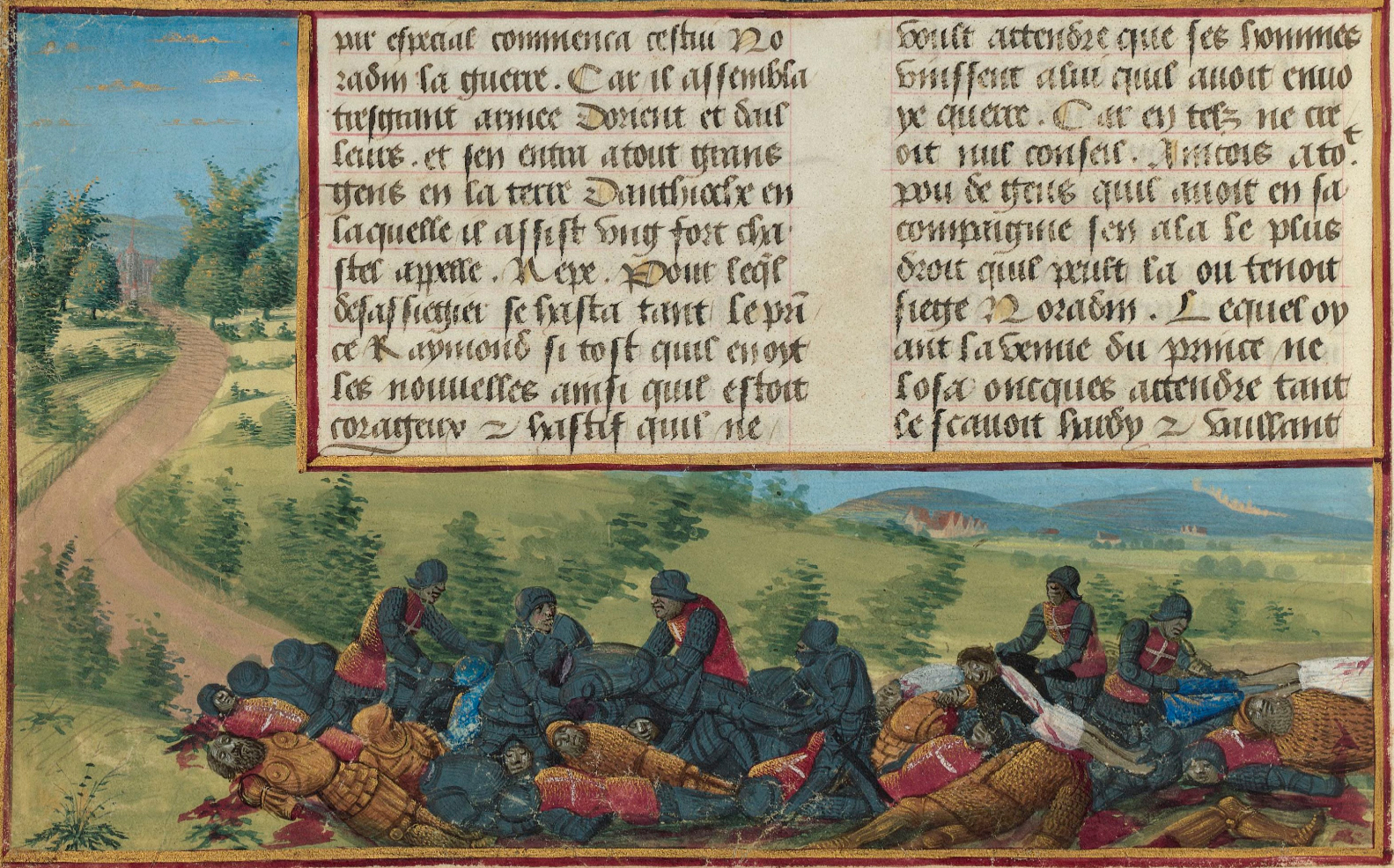
Recovery of the body of Bohemond's father, Raymond of Poitiers, after the Battle of Inab

Bohemond was the elder son of Princess Constance of Antioch and her first husband, Raymond of Poitiers. He was born around 1148. Prince Raymond died fighting against Nur al-Din Zengi, atabeg (governor) of Aleppo, in the Battle of Inab on 29 June 1149.

Neither King Baldwin III of Jerusalem nor the Byzantine Emperor Manuel I Komnenos could persuade the widowed Constance to take a new husband. Finally, she chose Raynald of Châtillon, a French knight who had recently settled in Syria. Raynald ruled the principality as Constance's husband from 1153 until he was captured by Majd al-Din, governor of Aleppo, in late November 1160 or 1161.

Urged by the Antiochene noblemen, Baldwin III proclaimed Bohemond the rightful ruler, charging Aimery of Limoges, Latin Patriarch of Antioch, with the administration of the principality during Bohemond's minority. However, Constance appealed to Manuel Komnenos, who confirmed her position as the sole ruler of Antioch. Constance wanted to retain power even after Bohemond reached the age of majority. However, the Antiochene noblemen rebelled against her with the assistance of Thoros II, Lord of Armenian Cilicia, forcing her to leave Antioch in February 1163.

== Prince of Antioch ==
=== First years ===
The crusader states around 1165

Bohemond was installed as prince after his mother was dethroned. Nur ad-Din laid siege to Krak des Chevaliers in the County of Tripoli in September 1163. Raymond III of Tripoli appealed to Bohemond for assistance. Bohemond and Constantine Kalamanos, Byzantine governor of Cilicia, hurried to the castle. The united Christian armies defeated the besiegers in the Battle of al-Buqaia.

King Amalric entrusted the government of the Kingdom of Jerusalem to Bohemond before departing for his campaign against Egypt in July 1164. Taking advantage of Bohemond's absence, Nur ad-Din attacked the fortress at Harenc in the Principality of Antioch (present-day Harem, Syria). Bohemond, Raymond III of Tripoli, Thoros II of Armenian Cilicia, and Constantine Kalamanos joined their forces and marched to Harenc, compelling Nur ad-Din to retreat.

Reynald of Saint-Valery, Lord of Harenc, tried to convince Bohemond not to pursue the enemy, but Bohemond did not follow his advice. The armies clashed at the battle of Harim on 10 August 1164. Nur ad-Din almost annihilated the Christian army. Most Christian commanders (including Bohemond) were captured. Two days later, Harenc fell to Nur ad-Din. Nur ad-Din took his prisoners to Aleppo. His advisors urged Nur ad-Din to proceed to Antioch, but he declined, fearing that an attack on Antioch could provoke Emperor Manuel into annexing the principality. Amalric of Jerusalem hurried to Antioch to start negotiations with Nur ad-Din. Before long, Nur ad-Din released Bohemond, along with Thoros II of Cilicia, for a ransom because he regarded them as vassals of the Byzantine emperor.

The Muslims advised [Nur ad-Din] to proceed to Antioch and seize it because it was devoid of defenders and fighting men to hold it, but he did not do so. He said, "The city is an easy matter but the citadel is strong. Perhaps they will surrender it to the Byzantine emperor because its ruler is his nephew. To have Bohemond as a neighbor I find preferable to being a neighbour of the ruler of the Constantinople." He sent out squadrons in those areas and they plundered, seized and killed the inhabitants. Later he ransomed Prince Bohemond for a large sum of money and the release of many Muslim captives.

— Ali ibn al-Athir: The Complete History

=== Byzantine alliance ===
Soon after his release, Bohemond visited Emperor Manuel in Constantinople and paid homage to him. In return for monetary aid, Bohemond agreed to allow Athanasius I Manasses, the Eastern Orthodox patriarch of Antioch, to accompany him back to Antioch. The Latin patriarch, Aimery, left Antioch and imposed an interdict on the city. Manuel's cousin Andronikos Komnenos, who was made Byzantine governor of Cilicia in 1166, often visited Antioch to meet Bohemond's beautiful young sister, Philippa. Bohemond appealed to Manuel, who dismissed Andronikos, replacing him with Constantine Kalamanos.

Bohemond granted Apamea to the Knights Hospitaller in 1168. An earthquake destroyed most towns of northern Syria on 29 June 1170. The Greek patriarch, Athanasius, died when the edifice of the Cathedral of St. Peter collapsed on him during the Mass. Bohemond went to Qosair (present-day Altınözü, Turkey) and persuaded the exiled Latin Patriarch to return to his see.

Mleh, who had seized Cilicia with Nur ad-Din's help, besieged Bagras, the fortress of the Knights Templars near Antioch, in early 1170. Bohemond sought assistance from Amalric of Jerusalem, and their united army defeated Mleh, also forcing him to restore the towns of the Cilician plains to the Byzantine Empire. Bohemond's relationship with Armenian Cilicia remained tense, which prevented him from pursuing an active foreign policy until Mleh was dethroned in 1175.

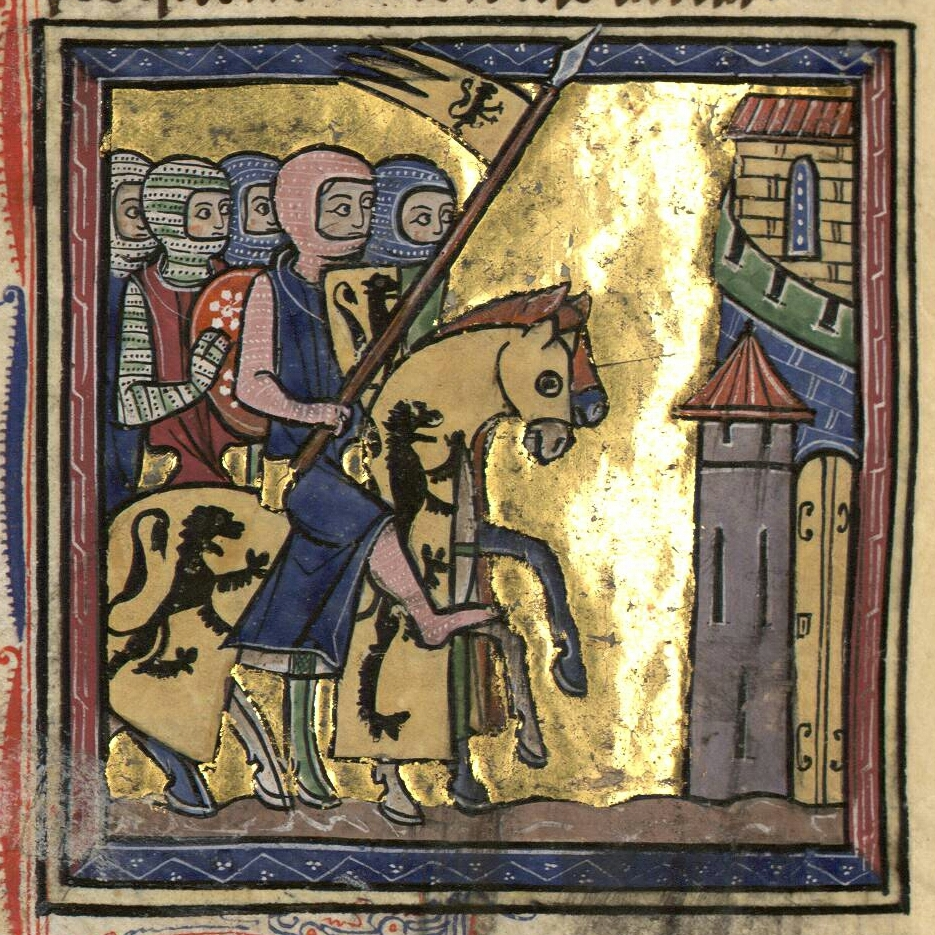
Bohemond and Raymond III of Tripoli ride to Jerusalem.

Bohemond concluded an alliance with Gumushtekin, atabeg of Aleppo, against Saladin, the Ayyubid ruler of Egypt and Syria, in May 1176. On Bohemond's demand, Gumushtekin released his Christian prisoners, including Bohemond's stepfather, Raynald of Châtillon. To strengthen his alliance with the Byzantine Empire, in 1177 Bohemond married Theodora, who was closely related to Emperor Manuel.

Bohemond met Count Philip I of Flanders, who had come to the Kingdom of Jerusalem in September 1177. According to the contemporaneous William of Tyre, many crusaders blamed Bohemond and Raymond III of Tripoli for dissuading Philip from participating in a military campaign against Egypt, preferring instead to take advantage of Philip's presence in their own realms. Indeed, in December Philip and Bohemond jointly laid siege to Harenc, a fortress of As-Salih Ismail al-Malik, Emir of Damascus, seizing the opportunity following a mutiny of the garrison. They lifted the siege soon after As-Salih informed them that Saladin (the common enemy of both As-Salih and Bohemond) had left Egypt for Syria. As-Salih paid 50,000 dinars and renounced half of the nearby villages in favor of Bohemond.

Bohemond and Raymond III of Tripoli marched to the Kingdom of Jerusalem in early 1180, according to William of Tyre. Baldwin IV of Jerusalem feared that the two princes (who were his father's cousins) had come to dethrone him, the symptoms of his leprosy having become "more and more evident" by that time. Historian Bernard Hamilton, who accepts William of Tyre's narration, says that Bohemond and Raymond came to Jerusalem to choose a husband for Baldwin's sister and heir, Sibylla, wishing to decrease the influence of the king's maternal relatives. However, Baldwin gave her in marriage to Guy of Lusignan, who was supported by their mother, Agnes of Courtenay. Sibylla's marriage contributed to the formation of two parties of noblemen. Bohemond, Raymond III of Tripoli, and the Ibelin brothers became the leaders of the group that opposed Guy of Lusignan.

=== Conflicts ===
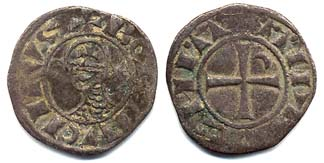
A coin of Bohemond III: +BOAMVNDVS +ANTIOCHIA

Manuel I Komnenos died on 24 September 1180. Bohemond soon repudiated his wife, Theodora, to marry an Antiochene lady of bad reputation, Sibylla. Patriarch Aimery accused Bohemond of adultery and excommunicated him. After Bohemond confiscated church property, Aimery imposed an interdict on Antioch and fled to his fortress at Qosair. Bohemond besieged the fortress, but Rainald II Masoir, Lord of Margat, and other noblemen who supported the patriarch rose up against him.

Baldwin IV sent Heraclius, Patriarch of Jerusalem, along with other bishops, and Raynald of Châtillon to Antioch to mediate. After preparatory negotiations with the envoys in Latakia, Bohemond and Aimery met in Antioch. Bohemond agreed to restore confiscated church property and Aimery lifted the interdict, but Bohemond's excommunication remained in force because he refused to return to Theodora. Peace was not fully restored, and the leaders of the opposition fled to Armenian Cilicia.

Bohemond made peace with Imad ad-Din Zengi II, the Zengid ruler of Aleppo, in May 1182. However, Imad ad-Din was forced to surrender Aleppo to Saladin on 11 June 1183. Fearing an attack on Antioch, Bohemond sold Tarsus to Roupen III, Lord of Armenian Cilicia, to raise funds. Baldwin IV of Jerusalem promised to send 300 knights to Antioch. Saladin did not invade the principality and signed a peace treaty with Bohemond. Bohemond attended the assembly that Baldwin IV had summoned to discuss the administration of the Kingdom of Jerusalem in autumn 1183. At the meeting, Guy of Lusignan was dismissed as regent, and his five-year-old stepson, Baldwin, was proclaimed co-ruler. A charter shows that Bohemond was in Acre in April 1185, suggesting that he was present when the leper Baldwin IV died around that time.

Roupen III of Armenian Cilicia laid siege to Lampron, the seat of his rival, Hethum III of Lampron. Hethum sent envoys to Bohemond, seeking his assistance. Bohemond invited Roupen to a banquet to Antioch where he had Roupen captured and imprisoned in 1185. Bohemond invaded Cilicia, but he could not prevent Roupen's brother, Leo, from seizing Lampron. An Armenian nobleman, Pagouran of Barbaron, mediated a peace treaty. Roupen agreed to pay a ransom and to renounce Sarventikar, Tall Hamdun, Mamistra, and Adana. He also acknowledged Bohemond's suzerainty. After the ransom was paid in 1186, Bohemond released Roupen, who soon reconquered the fortresses and towns that he had ceded to Antioch.

=== Saladin's triumph ===
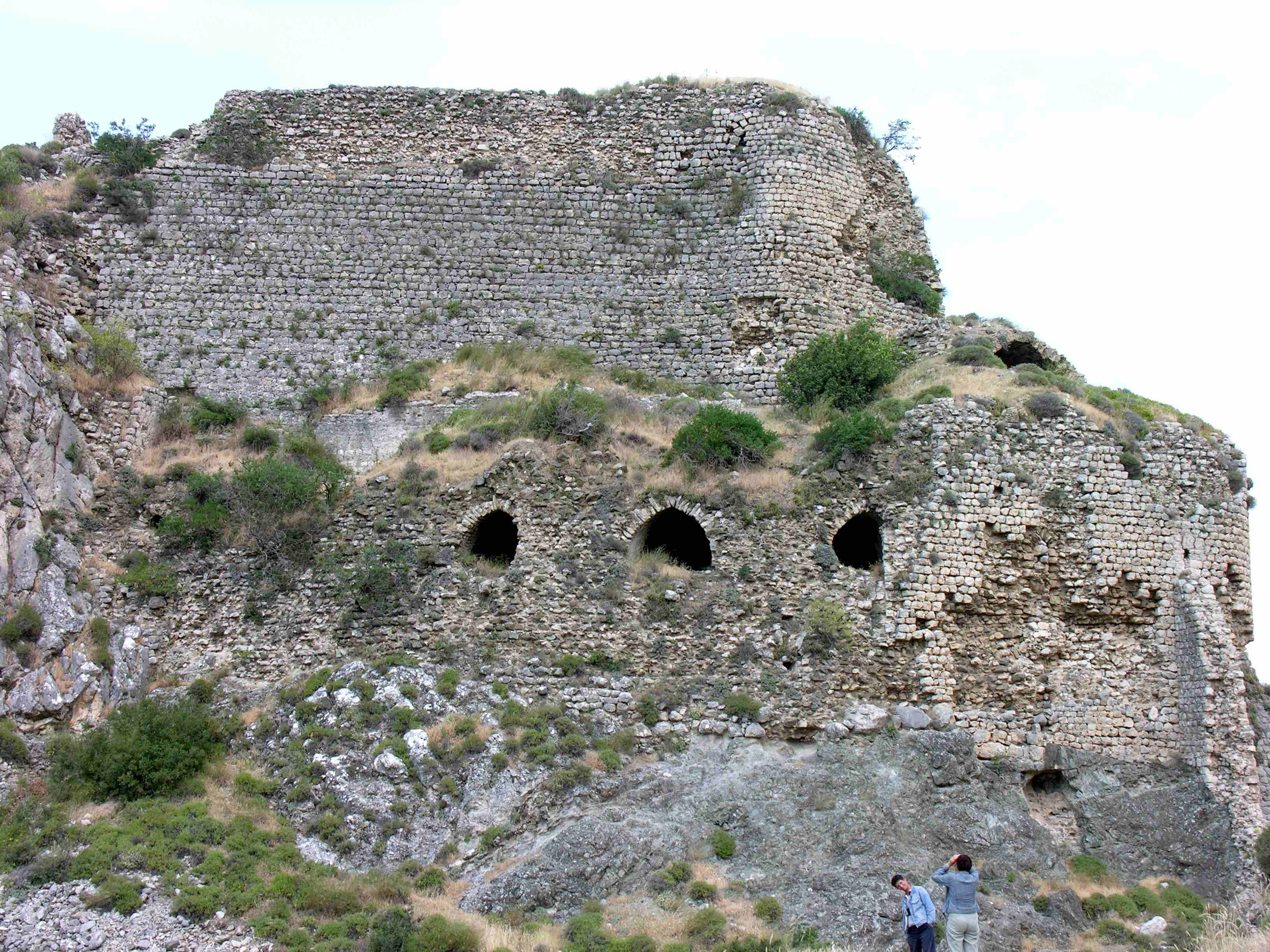
Ruins of Bagras

The child Baldwin V of Jerusalem died in late summer 1186. Raymond of Tripoli and his supporters could not prevent Baldwin V's mother, Sibylla, and her husband, Guy of Lusignan, from seizing the throne. Baldwin of Ibelin, who was the only Jerusalemite baron to refuse to pay homage to Sibylla and Guy after their coronation, moved to Antioch. Bohemond granted a fief to him.

Nomad Turkmen bands invaded Cilicia, forcing the new ruler, Leo, to swear fealty to Bohemond shortly after his ascension in 1186 or 1187. The Turkmens also broke into the Principality of Antioch, pillaging the lowlands around Latakia and the monasteries in the nearby mountains. Bohemond was forced to make a truce with Al-Muzaffar Umar, Saladin's governor in Syria, who joined Saladin's invasion of the Kingdom of Jerusalem in May. Even so, Bohemond sent 50 knights under the command of his elder son, Raymond, to Jerusalem after a Christian army was almost annihilated in the Battle of Cresson. The Turkmens continued their plundering raid until the Antiochene army defeated them and seized their booty.

Saladin launched a crushing defeat on the Christian army in the Battle of Hattin on 4 July 1187. Bohemond's son was one of the few Christian leaders to flee from the battlefield. Within three months, Saladin captured almost all towns and fortresses of the Kingdom of Jerusalem. Raymond III of Tripoli, who died before the end of the year, willed the County of Tripoli to Bohemond's elder son and heir, Raymond. Bohemond sent his younger son and namesake to take control of Tripoli, convinced that one ruler could not defend both Antioch and Tripoli. After his son was installed in Tripoli, Bohemond became "the greatest of the Franks and their most extensive ruler", according to Ibn Al-Athir. Bohemond offered to pay homage to William II of Sicily in exchange for military assistance.

Saladin started the invasion of northern Syria on 1 July 1188. His troops captured Latakia on 22 or 23 July, Sahyun six days later, and the fortresses along the Orontes River in August. After the Knights Templar surrendered their fortress at Bagras to Saladin on 26 September, Bohemond pleaded for a truce, offering the release of his Muslim prisoners. Saladin granted the truce from 1 October 1188 to 31 May 1189. Bohemond managed to retain only his capital and the port of St Symeon. Saladin stipulated that Antioch was to be surrendered without resistance if no reinforcements came before the end of May 1189. Bohemond urged the Holy Roman emperor, Frederick Barbarossa, to come to Syria, offering him the suzerainty over Antioch.

This summer the unspeakable Saladin totally destroyed the city of Tortosa except for the Templar citadel, burnt down the city of Valania before moving on to the region of Antioch where he claimed the famous cities of Jabala and Latakia, the strongholds of Saône, Gorda, Cavea and [Burzey] and the lands as far as Antioch. Beyond Antioch he besieged and captured Darbsak and [Bagras]. Thus, with the whole of the principality apart from our stronghold at Margat, more or less destroyed and lost, the prince and the people of Antioch made a pitiful agreement with Saladin, that if no help was forthcoming in the seven months from the beginning of that month of October they would formally surrender Antioch, alas without even a stone being thrown, a city acquired with the blood of valiant Christians.

— Letter by Armengarde of Aspe, Master of the Hospital, to Leopold V, Duke of Austria (November 1188)

=== Third crusade ===
The Crusader states around 1190

Guy of Lusignan, who had recently been released, came to Antioch in July or August 1188. Bohemond did not provide him with military assistance, and Guy left for Tripoli.

Frederick Barbarossa departed from the Holy Roman Empire in May 1189. The defence of Antioch was a principal aim of his crusade, but he died unexpectedly near Seleucia in Asia Minor (present-day Silifke in Turkey) on 10 June 1190. His son Duke Frederick VI of Swabia took over the command of the army, but most crusaders decided to return to Europe. The remnants of the German crusaders reached Antioch on 21 June 1190. Bohemond paid homage to Frederick of Swabia. Barbarossa's body, which had been carried to Antioch, was buried in the cathedral before the duke continued his crusade toward the Holy Land.

In May 1191 Bohemond sailed to Limassol along with Guy of Lusignan and Leo of Cilicia to meet King Richard I of England, who had arrived to reconquer the Holy Land from Saladin. He once again met Richard during the siege of Acre in summer 1191, but he did not provide military support to the crusaders. Bohemond's relationship with Leo of Cilicia became tense when Leo captured Bagras and refused to cede it to the Knights Templar.

After Richard of England left the Holy Land, Bohemond met Saladin in Beirut on 30 October 1192. According to Ibn Al-Athir, Bohemond "did obeisance" and Saladin "bestowed a robe of honour upon him" at their meeting. They signed a ten-year truce that included both Antioch and Tripoli but did not cover Armenian Cilicia even though Leo of Cilicia was Bohemond's vassal.

=== Last years ===
Bohemond's wife, Sibylla, wanted to secure Antioch for her son, William, with the assistance of Leo of Cilicia (whose wife, Isabel, was her niece). Leo invited Bohemond and his family to Bagras, saying that he wanted to start negotiations regarding the surrender of the fortress either to Antioch or to the Templars in early 1194. The meeting was a trap: Bohemond was captured and taken to Leo's capital, Sis.

Coat-of-Arms of Poitiers of Antioch

Bohemond was compelled to surrender Antioch to Leo. He appointed his marshal, Bartholomew Tirel, to accompany the Armenian troops, which were under the command of Hethoum of Sason, to Antioch. The Antiochene noblemen allowed Leo's soldiers to enter the town, but the mainly Greek and Latin burgers opposed Leo's rule. An Armenian soldier's rude remark about Saint Hilary, to whom the royal chapel was dedicated, provoked a riot, forcing the Armenians to withdraw from the town. The burghers assembled in the cathedral to form a commune under the auspices of Patriarch Aimery. They declared Bohemond's eldest son, Raymond, regent for his imprisoned father. Raymond's younger brother, Bohemond, also hurried from Tripoli to Antioch, and the Armenian forces had to return to Cilicia.

Henry II of Champagne, ruler of the Kingdom of Jerusalem, came to Antioch to mediate a peace treaty in early 1195. After Bohemond renounced his claim to suzerainty over Cilicia and acknowledged Leo's possession of Bagras, Leo released him and his retainers. Before long, Bohemond's son, Raymond, married Leo's niece and heir, Alice.

Raymond died in early 1197, but his widow gave birth to a posthumous son, Raymond-Roupen. The elderly Bohemond sent her and her infant son to Cilicia wanting either to secure Antioch for his son by Sibylla, or to guarantee their security. Bohemond assisted Duke Henry I of Brabant in capturing Beirut in October 1197. Before long, he decided to besiege Jabala and Latakia, but he had to return to Antioch to meet the papal legate, Conrad of Wittelsbach, the archbishop of Mainz. The archbishop had come to Antioch to secure Raymond-Roupen's right to succeed Bohemond. On Conrad's demand, Bohemond summoned the Antiochene noblemen, who swore fealty to his grandson.

Bohemond of Tripoli regarded himself his father's lawful heir, because he was Bohemond's elder surviving son. He came to Antioch at the end of 1198 and persuaded the commune to accept his rule. Before long, the younger Bohemond returned to Tripoli, enabling his father to re-take control of state affairs, suggesting that the elder Bohemond had tacitly supported his son's coup. Leo I of Cilicia appealed to the Holy See to protect Raymond-Roupen's interest, but the Knights Templar submitted a complaint against him for refusing to restore Bagras to them.

Bohemond died in April 1201. His son hurried to Antioch to attend his funeral. The commune proclaimed him prince, but many noblemen who remained loyal to Raymond-Roupen fled to Cilicia. The ensuing War of the Antiochene Succession lasted for years, until the death of Leo in May 1219.

== Family ==
Bohemond's first wife, Orgueilleuse of Harenc, was first mentioned in charters issued in 1170, suggesting that Bohemond married her in or before that year. She was last mentioned in February or March 1175. She was the mother of Bohemond's two eldest sons, Raymond and Bohemond.

Bohemond's second wife, Theodora (whom the Lignages d'Outremer mentioned as Irene) was a relative of the Byzantine Emperor Manuel I Komnenos. Historian Charles M. Brand identifies her as the daughter of Manuel's nephew, John Doukas Komnenos. According to the Lignages d'Outremer, Theodora gave birth to a daughter, Constance, who was not mentioned in other sources.

William of Tyre described Sibylla, the third wife of Bohemond, as a witch who "practised evil magics" to seduce Bohemond. Michael the Syrian stated that Sibylla was a whore. Her sister was the wife of Bohemond's vassal, the lord of Burzey, and Ali ibn al-Athir described this sister as a spy who was "in correspondence with Saladin and exchanged gifts with him." Bohemond and Sibylla's daughter, Alice, became the wife of the wealthy Lord Guy I Embriaco of Gibelet. William, the son of Bohemond and Sibylla, may have been named for William II of Sicily. In his fourth marriage, Bohemond married Isabella of Farabel, with whom he had Bohemond of Botron, who married Isabelle, heiress to the Lordship of Botrun. (Note: Rudt-Collenberg has argued Sybil and Isabelle are one and the same.)

Bohemond's close family and relationship with the rulers of Jerusalem, Tripoli, and Sicily

Tancred of Hauteville	Fressenda
Hugh I of Rethel	Melisende of Montlhéry	Alberada of Buonalbergo	Robert Guiscard	Roger I of Sicily
Baldwin II of Jerusalem	Morphia of Melitene	Constance of France	Bohemond I of Antioch	Roger II of Sicily
Melisende of Jerusalem	Alice of Jerusalem	Bohemond II of Antioch	Hodierna of Jerusalem	William I of Sicily
Baldwin III of Jerusalem	Amalric of Jerusalem	Raymond III of Tripoli	William II of Sicily
Raymond of Poitiers	Constance of Antioch	Raynald of Châtillon
Baldwin IV of Jerusalem	Sibylla of Jerusalem (m. Guy of Lusignan)	Isabella I of Jerusalem
Bohemond III of Antioch	Maria (m. Manuel I Komnenos)	Philippa (m. Humphrey II of Toron)	Baldwin	Agnes (m. Béla III of Hungary)
Baldwin V of Jerusalem	Raymond IV of Tripoli	Bohemond IV of Antioch

== Sources ==
=== Primary sources ===
- Letters from the East: Crusaders, Pilgrims and Settlers in the 12th–13th Centuries (Translated by Malcolm Barber and Keith Bate) (2010). Ashgate. ISBN 978-0-7546-6356-0.
- The Chronicle of Ibn Al-Athir for the Crusading Period from Al-Kamil Fi'l-Ta'rikh (Part 2: The Years 541-582/1146-1193: The Age of Nur ad-Din and Saladin) (Translated by D. S. Richards) (2007). Ashgate. ISBN 978-0-7546-4078-3.

=== Secondary sources ===
- Baldwin, Marshall W. (1969). "The Latin States under Baldwin III and Amalric I, 1143–1174". In Setton, Kenneth M.; Baldwin, Marshall W. (eds.). A History of the Crusades, Volume I: The First Hundred Years. The University of Wisconsin Press. pp. 528–561. ISBN 0-299-04844-6.
- Barber, Malcolm (2012). The Crusader States. Yale University Press. ISBN 978-0-300-11312-9.
- Boase, T. S. R. (1978). The Cilician Kingdom of Armenia. Edinburgh: Scottish Academic Press. ISBN 0-7073-0145-9.
- Burgtorf, Jochen (2016). "The Antiochene war of succession". In Boas, Adrian J. (ed.). The Crusader World. The University of Wisconsin Press. pp. 196–211. ISBN 978-0-415-82494-1.
- Der Nersessian, Sirarpie (1969). "The Kingdom of Cilician Armenia". In Setton, Kenneth M.; Wolff, Robert Lee; Hazard, Harry (eds.). A History of the Crusades, Volume II: The Later Crusades, 1189–1311. The University of Wisconsin Press. pp. 630–659. ISBN 0-299-04844-6.
- Dunbabin, Jean (2000). France in the Making, 843-1180. Oxford University Press. ISBN 0-19-820846-4.
- Hamilton, Bernard (2000). The Leper King and His Heirs: Baldwin IV and the Crusader Kingdom of Jerusalem. Cambridge University Press. ISBN 978-0-521-64187-6.
- Hardwicke, Mary Nickerson (1969). "The Crusader States, 1192–1243". In Setton, Kenneth M.; Wolff, Robert Lee; Hazard, Harry (eds.). A History of the Crusades, Volume II: The Later Crusades, 1189–1311. The University of Wisconsin Press. pp. 522–554. ISBN 0-299-04844-6.
- Hodgson, Natasha (2011). "Conflict and cohabitation: marriage and diplomacy between Latins and Cilician Armenians, c. 1097-1253". In Kostick, Conor (ed.). The Crusades and the Near East: Cultural Histories. Routledge. pp. 83–106. ISBN 978-0-415-58040-3.
- Lock, Peter (2006). The Routledge Companion to the Crusades. Routledge. ISBN 978-0-415-39312-6.
- Riley-Smith, Jonathan Simon Christopher (2005). The Crusades: A History. Continuum. ISBN 0-8264-7269-9.
- Runciman, Steven (1989a). A History of the Crusades, Volume II: The Kingdom of Jerusalem and the Frankish East, 1100–1187. Cambridge University Press. ISBN 0-521-06163-6.
- Runciman, Steven (1989b). A History of the Crusades, Volume III: The Kingdom of Acre and the Later Crusades. Cambridge University Press. ISBN 0-521-06163-6.
- Van Tricht, Filip (2011). The Latin Renovatio of Byzantium: The Empire of Constantinople (1204–1228). BRILL. ISBN 978-90-04-20323-5.

Bohemond III of Antioch House of Poitiers Born: 1148 Died: April 1201
Regnal titles
Preceded by Constance	Prince of Antioch; 1163–1201	Succeeded by Bohemond IV
