= Rainald II Masoir =

Lord of Margat

- Lord of Margat; Constable of Antioch
- Tenure: c. 1140 - c. 1185
- Predecessor: Rainald I Masoir
- Successor: Bertrand Masoir
- Died: c. 1185
- Spouse: Agnes
- Issue: Thomas; Amaury; Mansur; Bertrand
- Father: Rainald I Masoir

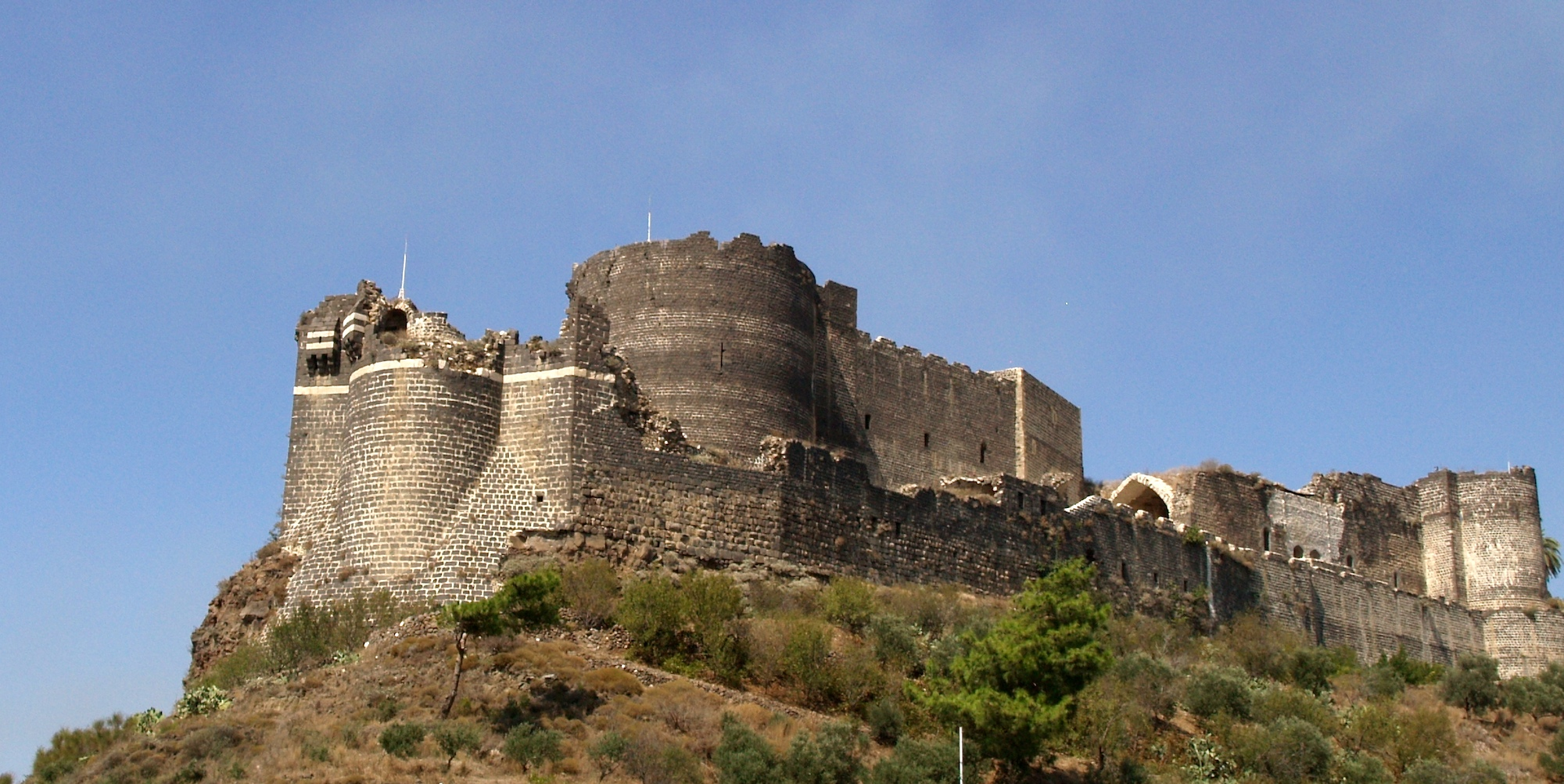
Margat Castle, Northern Syria.

Rainald II Masoir was the lord of Margat from c. 1140 to c. 1185. In 1133, his father lost his castle to the Muslims, but it was regained in 1140. Rainald was an avid supporter of Aimery of Limoges, taking his side against Bohemond III of Antioch during the latter's war with the church.

== Early life ==
The date and circumstances of Rainald's birth are not known. He was the son of Rainald I Masoir, an influential Antiochene nobleman, described by Walter the Chancellor as "of illustrious birth, powerful in property, of a great spirit and courageous in his person".

In 1133, the castle of Margat was lost to the Muslims, and Rainald's father likely died the following year; Rainald would subsequently inherit the title of constable. However, the castle was retaken by the crusaders in 1140, and Rainald regained possession and power over it.

== Sources ==
- Kennedy, Hugh (1994). Crusader Castles. Cambridge University Press. ISBN 0-521-79913-9.
- Asbridge, Thomas S.; Edgington, Susan B. (1999). Walter the Chancellor’s The Antiochene Wars: A Translation and Commentary. Ashgate. ISBN 1-84014-263-4.
