= Roche-Guillaume =

Coordinates: 36°39′34″N 36°19′33″E

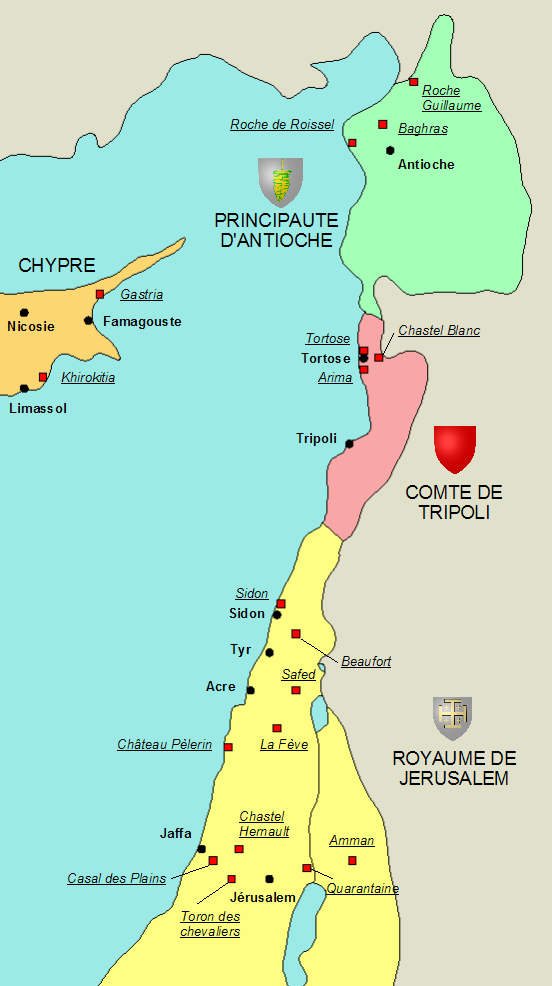
Templar fortresses in the Outremer

La Roche-Guillaume (perhaps modern-day Çalan Kalesi) was a medieval fortress of the Knights Templar located near the Syrian Gates in what is now the Hatay Province of Turkey.

== Origin ==
The date that the Templars first took possession of the fortress is unknown, but it is known that the fortress was previously occupied by the de la Roche family.

Legend states that in 1188, Saladin placed the castle under siege because Jean Gale, (Note: The narrator of the Age of Empires II: The Saladin Campaign might be Jean Gale.) a knight against whom he sought revenge, was there. Years prior, Gale had been excommunicated from the Christian community for murder and had found refuge with Saladin in Muslim territory. Saladin charged Gale with the education of his nephew, but wanting to regain his standing among the Christians, Gale turned over Saladin's nephew to the Templars, driving Saladin to vengeance. Saladin may have taken Roche-Guillaume, but news from Palestine that King Guy de Lusignan had led knights into Tripoli as forebears of the Third Crusade brought an early end to his siege of the castle.

In 1203, the king of Armenian Kingdom of Cilicia took the castle, but it was reclaimed by the Templars in 1237, around the same time as they launched a campaign to recapture the castle of Trapessac, located about 15 kilometers away. Roche-Guillaume was reconquered by the Muslims in 1298–99, when the sultan of Egypt sent an army to invade northern Syria. The castle of Servantikar was also seized in the campaign.

In 1298 or 1299, the military orders—the Knights Templar and Knights Hospitaller—and their leaders, including Jacques de Molay, Otton de Grandson and the Great Master of the Hospitallers, briefly campaigned in Armenia, in order to fight off an invasion by the Mamluks. However, they were not successful, and soon, the fortress of Roche-Guillaume, the last Templar stronghold in Antioch, was lost to the Muslims.

== Location and Characteristics ==
The authors have disagreed with the exact location of this castle. According to Paul Deschamps, it would be Çalan Kalesi, but Claude Cahen argued that Çalan might be Roche de Roissel, another Templar castle. However, they all agreed to place it in the Amanus, on the border of what was the Principality of Antioch and Armenian Kingdom of Cilicia. Others placed it further east, on a plateau at 1,250-metre (4,100 ft) rocky precipice above the plain of Karasu Çayı, near the Euphrates. The castle also controlled the road that led to Antioch and the plain below.

Today, little remains of Roche-Guillaume but ruins. These, however, show that the constructors of the fortress used the rock upon which the castle was built as a cut foundation. The castle's remains suggest that the structure may be Byzantine in origin, or at the very least it was maintained at some length by the Byzantines.

The best-preserved portion of the fortress is the chapel, which was common in fortresses of military orders. The presence and current state of the chapel further suggests Byzantine custodianship.

== Bibliography ==
- Alain Demurger, The Last Templar
- Guizot, François-Pierre-Guillaume (1835). Table générale et analytique des mémoires relatifs à l'histoire de France. Paris: Dépôt central de la librairie.
- Hill, Paul (2018). The Knights Templar at War, 1120–1312. Grub Street Publishers. ISBN 9781473874947.
- Newman, Sharan (2006). Real History Behind the Templars. Berkley Publishing Group. ISBN 978-0-425-21533-3.
- Cahen, Claude (1940). La Syrie du nord a l'époque des croisades (in French).
- Deschamps, Paul (1934). Les Châteaux des Croisés en Terre Sainte, vol. III. La Défense du Comité de Tripoli et de la Principauté d'Antioche (in French). Institut Français d'Arquéologie de Beyrouth.
