= Constantine Kalamanos =

Byzantine governor of Cilicia

Constantine Kalamanos or Coloman (Greek: Κωνσταντῖνος Καλαμανός; 1137/1145 – after 1173) also referred to as Doux of Cilcia, was a Byzantine general and governor of Cilicia.

Constantine was the eldest son of Boris Calamanos (pretender to the throne of the Kingdom of Hungary) and Areta Doukaina.

== Military career ==
In 1163, Emperor Manuel I Komnenos appointed Constantine governor of Cilicia, a province of the empire, whose fortresses had just been captured by the Armenian prince Thoros II. However, when he arrived in Cilicia, Prince Thoros withdrew to the mountains. Princess Constance of Antioch, wishing to retain power for her son, Bohemond III of Antioch, appealed to Constantine for military assistance. However, as soon as the appeal was heard, he caused a revolt in Antioch and was exiled.

Shortly afterwards, Constantine and Bohemond III lost their armies to Nur ad-Din Zengi's army after the siege of Krak des Chevaliers, a fortress in the County of Tripoli. After a short battle in which Constantine and his troops distinguished themselves, Nur ad-Din Zengi fled to Homs.

In the summer of 1164, Nur ad-Din Zengi was besieging the fortress of Harim in the Principality of Antioch. After Bohemond's provocation, Constantine rushed with his troops, and Nur ad-Din Zengi, upon hearing the news, increased the siege to no avail. While he was retreating, the Christian forces followed him, and their armies met on the 10th of August. The ensuing battle was a disaster for the Christians: their leaders (including Constantine) were captured and taken to Aleppo. However, Nur ad-Din Zengi was anxious not to offend the Byzantine Empire, and almost immediately released Constantine (1166), in exchange for one hundred and fifty pieces of silver.

During his captivity, Cilicia was ruled by Alexios Axouch and later by Andronikos Komnenos. When Constantine was released, Emperor Manuel I reinstated him. In 1170, Prince Mleh of Armenia invaded the Byzantine province of Cilicia with the help of Nur ad-Din Zengi, and took Mopsuestia, Adana, and Tarsus. Although Constantine could have regained the lost territories with the help of King Amalric I of Jerusalem and Prince Bohemond III, he did not do so and was captured by Prince Mleh a year later.
