= Battle of Harim =

Part of the Crusades (1164)

- Part of the Crusades
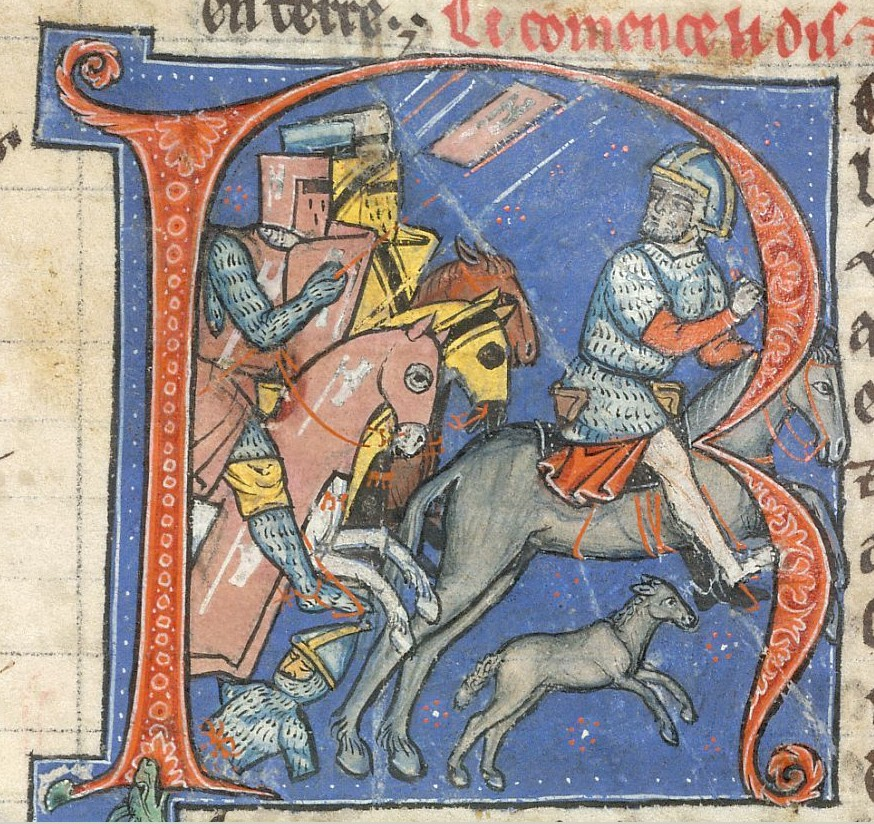
- Mail-coated Nur al-Din Zengi, with bare legs and an open helmet, fleeing on horseback from two knights (Geoffrey Martel and Hugh de Lusignan the elder) pursuing him on war horses at the Battle of Harim. "Histoire d'Outremer" (1232–1261) – BL Yates Thompson MS 12
Date	12 August 1164
Location	Harem, Syria 36°12′N 36°31′E
Result	Decisive Zengid victory

Belligerents
Zengids; Mosul	County of Tripoli; Principality of Antioch; Byzantine Empire; Armenia

Commanders and leaders
Nur ad-Din Zangi; Shirkuh; Qutb ad-Din Mawdud	Raymond III of Tripoli (POW); Bohemund III of Antioch (POW); Konstantinos Kalamanos (POW); Thoros II of Armenia; Hugh VIII of Lusignan (POW); Joscelin III of Edessa (POW)

Strength
9,000	600 knights 12,000 foot soldiers

Casualties and losses
Unknown	10,000 (per Ibn al-Athir); Kalamanos, Hugh, Raymond, Bohemund, Joscelin captured

The Battle of Harim (Harenc) was fought on 12 August 1164 at Harim, Syria, between the forces of Nur ad-Din, and a combined army from the County of Tripoli, the Principality of Antioch, the Byzantine Empire, and Armenia. Nur ad-Din won a crushing victory, capturing most of the leaders of the opposing army.

== Background ==
In 1163, King Amalric I of Jerusalem led an invasion of Egypt, leaving the crusader states open to attack from the east. Nur ad-Din took advantage of this to invade Tripoli, but he was taken by surprise by a large combination of enemies at the Battle of al-Buqaia and was almost killed himself. He then moved north to Antioch, with assistance from his brother Qutb ad-Din in Mosul, his other vassals from Aleppo and Damascus, and the Ortoqids of the Jazira, and besieged the fortress of Harim (Harenc) in 1164. As William of Tyre says, "he stationed his engines around it in the customary manner and began to assault the place with a fury which permitted the inhabitants no rest."

== Battle ==
Reginald of Saint Valery, lord of Harim, called for help, and Raymond III of Tripoli, Bohemund III of Antioch, and Joscelin III of Edessa arrived to relieve the siege. They were joined by Konstantinos Kalamanos, the Byzantine governor of Cilicia, and Thoros, and Mleh of Armenia, as well as Hugh VIII of Lusignan and Geoffrey Martel, brother of William VI of Angoulême, both of whom had recently arrived on pilgrimage.

Nur ad-Din prepared to give up the siege when they arrived, but the crusaders, inspired by the victory at al-Buqaia, and, "regardless of the rules of military discipline ... recklessly dispersed and roved hither and yon in pursuit of the foe." Nur ad-Din's troops defended against their charge and led a counterattack, pushing the crusaders into a swamp, and they were massacred "like victims before the altar."

It is possible that Nur ad-Din was only feigning a retreat in order to draw the crusaders into an ambush, but abandoning a siege when a relief army arrived was a standard tactic and Nur ad-Din presumably had no way of knowing the crusaders would follow him. William's assertion that this was a reckless move is further evidence of this. "Only the Armenian Thoros, who had forseen [sic?] the Turkish maneuver and had not set off in pursuit, escaped from the disaster". Mleh also avoided capture. Konstantinos Kalamanos, Hugh, Raymond, Bohemund, and Joscelin were captured and imprisoned in Aleppo. According to Ibn al-Athir, 10,000 crusaders were killed.

== Aftermath ==
Nur ad-Din resumed the siege and captured Harim a few days later. With Amalric absent in Egypt, all three crusader states were now without their rulers, but Nur ad-Din did not want to attack Antioch itself for fear of provoking a Byzantine response, as the Principality was technically an Imperial fief. To his critics he replied, "I would rather have Bohemund as a neighbor than the King of the Greeks!". Nur ad-Din went on to besiege and capture Banias. Amalric abandoned Egypt and marched north with Thierry of Alsace to relieve Nur ad-Din's pressure on Antioch. Bohemund was released from captivity in 1165 but Raymond remained in prison until 1173.
