= Bagras =

Castle in İskenderun, Turkey

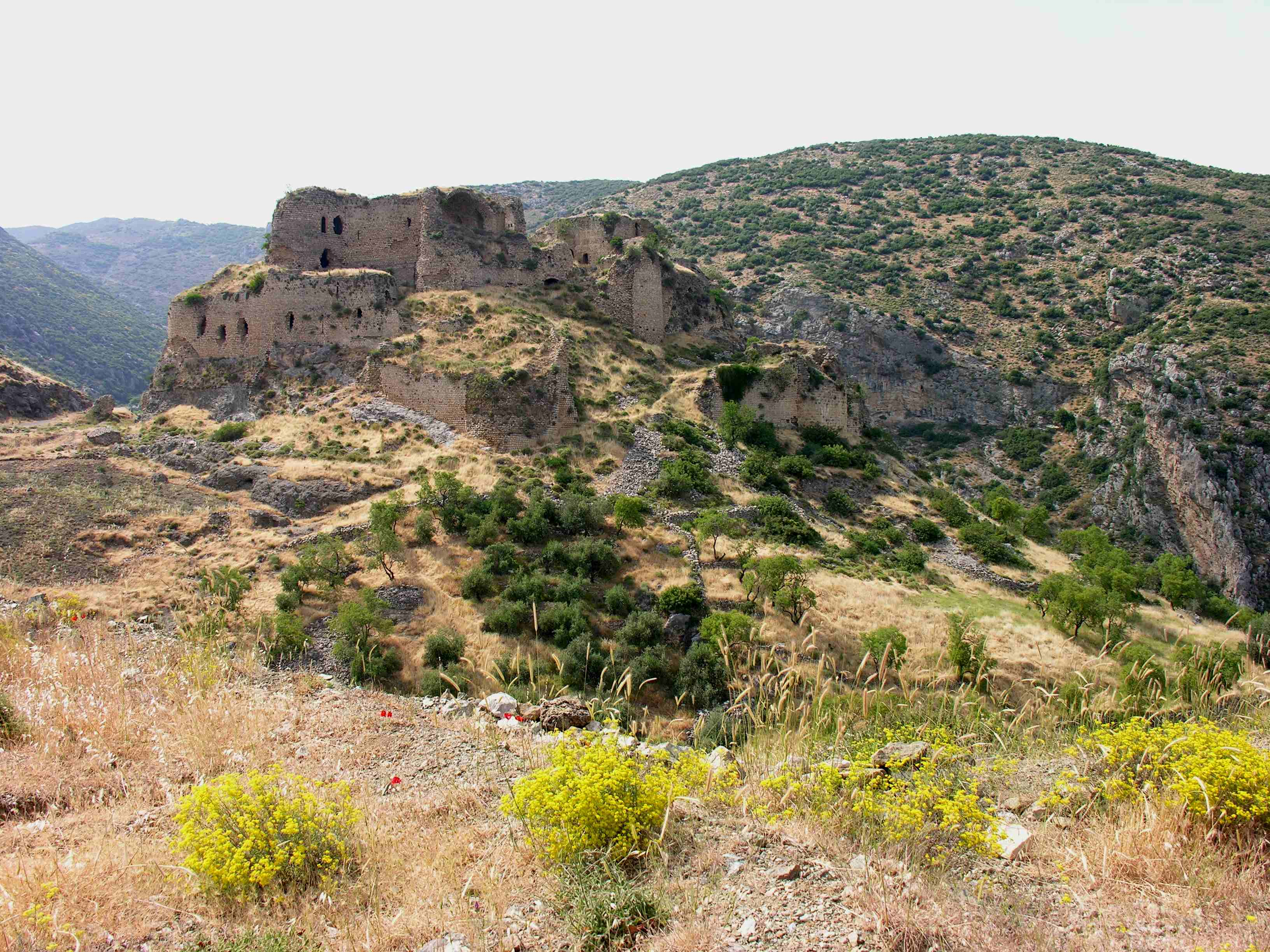
- Ruins of Bagras Castle, viewed from the southeast

- Location within Turkey
- 36°25′37″N 36°13′30″E
- Type: Castle
- Cultures: Armenian, Byzantine, Frankish
- Location: İskenderun, Turkey
- Region: Çukurova

Site notes
- Condition: Ruined

Bagras or Baghrās, ancient Pagrae (Greek: Πάγραι; Armenian: Պաղրաս, romanized: Paġras), is a ruined medieval castle in the İskenderun district of Turkey, in the Amanus Mountains.

== History of the castle ==
=== Ancient ===
Strabo’s Geographica describes Pagrae as a strong fortress in the district of Antioch, near Gindarus, situated on the pass over the Amanus Mountains that leads from the Gates of Amanus into Syria. It stood above the Plain of Antioch, through which the Arceuthus, Orontes, and Labotas rivers flowed.

Pliny the Elder lists Pagrae among the tetrarchies of Syria, together with Mammisea, Paradisus, and the Pinelitae, as part of the wider region of Cyrrhestice and the Syrian interior.

=== Early Medieval period ===
According to the Arab historian Al-Baladhuri, a massacre occurred in this place around the year 638 when 30,000 Ghassanid Arabs and their families were trying to escape the Muslim invasion of Syria but were attacked by the forces of Maisarah ibn Masruk, who had been sent in pursuit by Abu Ubaydah. This is likely exaggerated as many of these tribesmen would later serve in the Byzantine army.

Fortifications at Pagrae were erected in late 968 by the Byzantine emperor Nikephoros II Phokas, who stationed there 1000 footmen and 500 horsemen under the command of Michael Bourtzes to raid the countryside of the nearby city of Antioch. The castle provided a base for a force to cover the Syrian Gates, and was part of a multi-pronged approach by Phokas to inhibit communications between Antioch and the remaining Hamdanid emirate. It was built in two levels around a knoll, the fortification resembling Armenian work, and with water supplied by aqueducts. It is likely, that the Armenian monastic 'community of Jesus' (Yesuank‘/Yisuank‘) was located in the vicinity of the castle and was destroyed by the 1114 Marash earthquake.

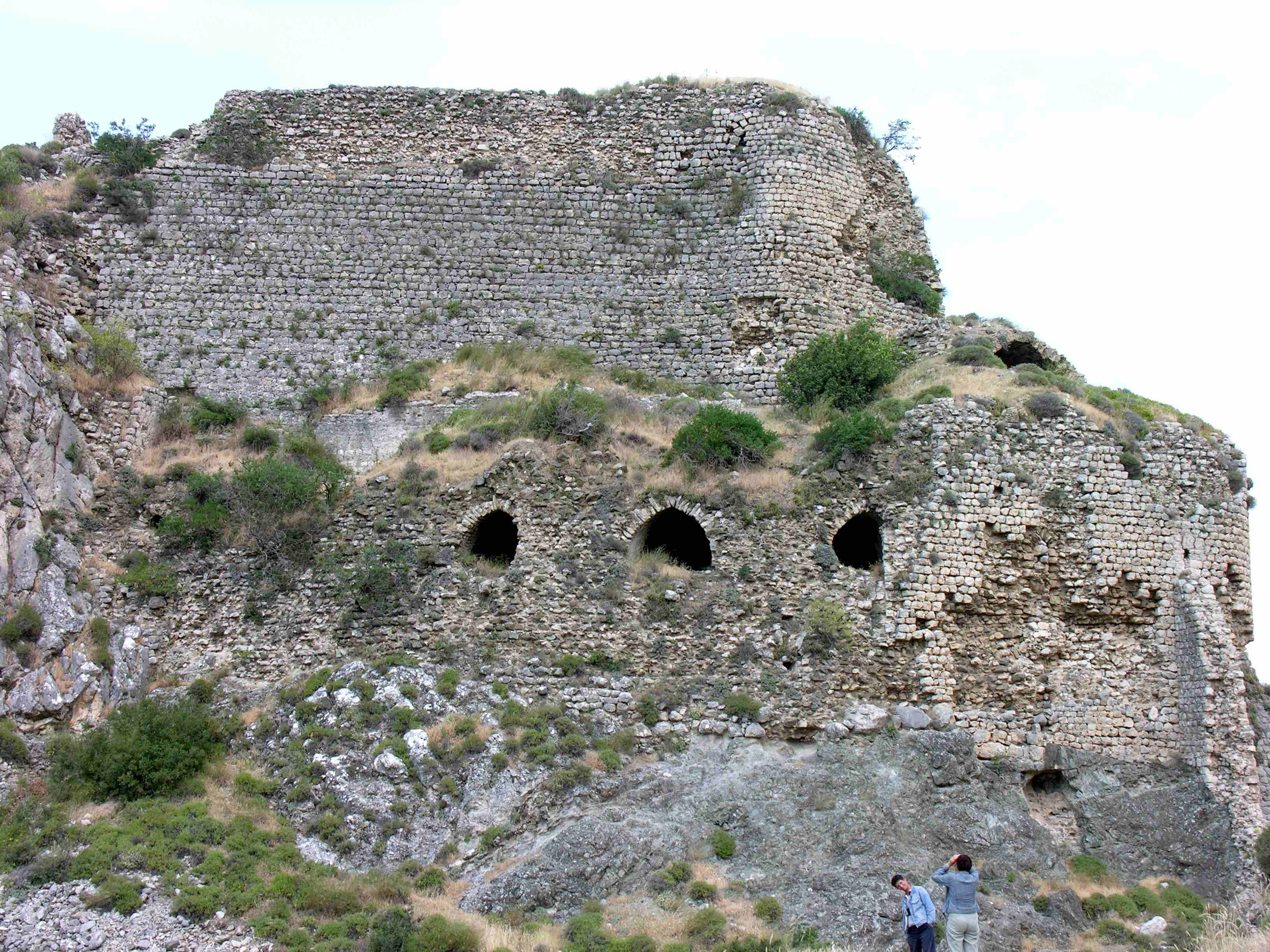
Closer view of the ruins, west side

=== High Medieval period ===
It was then rebuilt about 1153 by the Knights Templar under the name Gaston (also Gastun, Guascon, Gastim) and held by them or by the Principality of Antioch until it was forced to capitulate to Saladin on 26 August 1189. It was retaken in 1191 by the Armenians (under Leo II), and their possession of it became a major point of contention between them and the Antiochenes and Templars. The castle remained under Armenian control until 1215, when it was taken back by the Templars who held the castle until the 1268 conquest of Antioch.

According to the Armenian chronicle of Sempad the Constable, around 1229 Bagras withstood a siege by Al-Aziz, the emir of Aleppo, and his cavalry. After Baibars besieged and conquered Antioch in 1268, the garrison lost heart, and one of the brothers deserted and presented the keys of the castle to him. The remaining defenders decided to destroy what they could and surrender the castle. The brothers then fled to the nearby Templar stronghold of La Roche Guillaume before leaving to Acre to confess their abandonment and subsequent loss of the castle. It was decided that the brothers would not be expelled from the order, but would face the next harshest punishment of losing their habits for a year and a day. The record of this trial survives in a late thirteenth century Catalan copy of the Rule of the Templars. Despite the loss of the castle, Hethum II, King of Armenia and Leo IV, King of Armenia soundly defeated a Mamluk raiding force in the nearby pass in 1305.

The first comprehensive survey of Bagras was done by A. W. Lawrence in 1938, but was published only in 1978. A detailed historical and archaeological evaluation, including a surveyed plan of the entire complex, was completed in 1979 by R. W. Edwards. The fortification has more than thirty chambers which encompass the steep outcrop on three primary levels. Although the site initially had phases of Arab and Byzantine construction, most of the exterior masonry is from the Frankish occupations. Repairs to the towers and walls were made by the Armenians with their distinctive masonry during brief periods of control. Bağras was never integrated into the complex defensive system that the Armenians built along the Taurus and Anti-Taurus Mountains of Cilicia from the 12th through the 14th centuries.

== See also ==
- List of Crusader castles
