= Assizes of Antioch =

Collection of medieval treatises

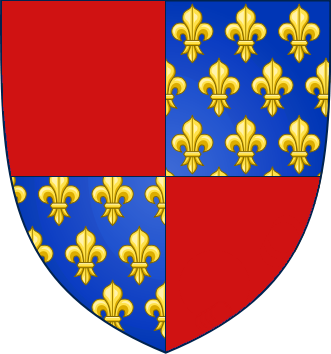
Coat of arms of the Principality of Antioch

The Assizes of Antioch are a collection of numerous medieval legal treatises written in Old French (then Armenian) containing the law of the crusader Principality of Antioch and Armenian Kingdom of Cilicia. They were compiled in the thirteenth century.
