= History of the County of Tripoli =

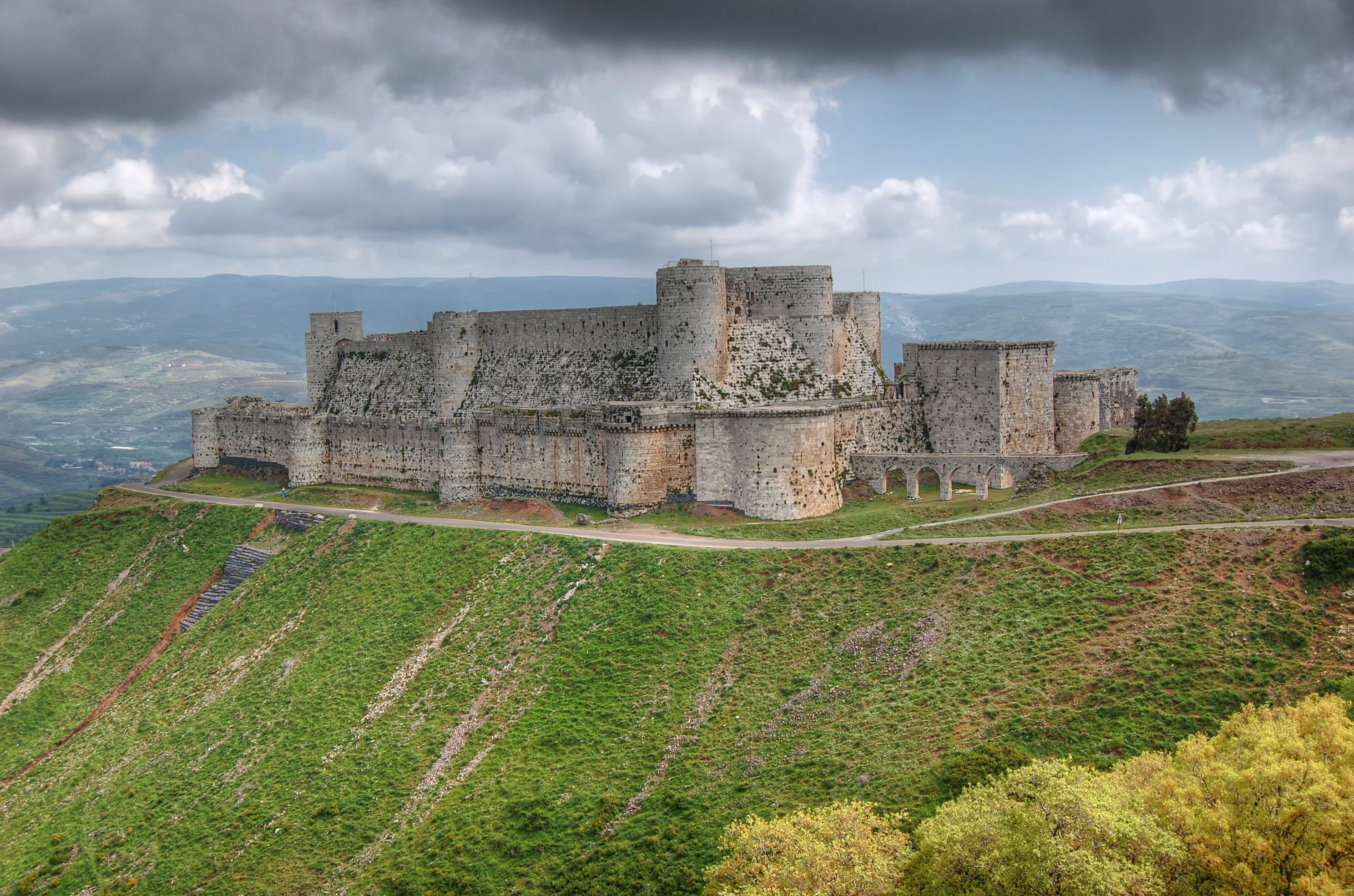
Crac des Chevaliers, the large fortress of the Knights Hospitaller in the County of Tripoli

The history of the County of Tripoli, a crusader state in the Levant, spans the period between 1103 and 1289. The county was established in the aftermath of the First Crusade by the Toulousian crusader leader Raymond of Saint-Gilles (d. 1105). He laid siege to the city of Tripoli with Byzantine support in 1103. Although the city resisted, Raymond adopted the title of count of Tripoli in the same year. After he died of wounds, his kinsman Willam Jordan (d. 1109) assumed the command of the siege but his claim to rule was challenged by Raymond's son Bertrand (d. 1112) who came to the Levant in 1109. William Jordan was assassinated and a large assembly of troops from all over the Latin East captured the city with Genoese and Pisan naval support in June 1109.

Bertrand swore fealty to King Baldwin I of Jerusalem (d. 1118), and contemporary documents indicate that the County of Tripoli was regarded a Jerusalemite fief, not an independent state. Its status changed during the reign of Bertrand's son Pons (d. 1137) who received important towns and fortresses, such as Tortosa and the future Crac des Chevaliers, in fief in the Principality of Antioch. He joined an alliance against the Jerusalemite king Fulk (d. 1129). Pons's son Raymond II (d. 1152) saw the consolidation of the Muslim states in Syria under the rule of Imad al-Din Zengi (d. 1146), which forced him to entrust the Knights Hospitaller with the defence of large border regions, and also cede fortresses to their rivals the Knights Templar. His son Raymond III (d. 1187) became deeply involved in the affairs of the Kingdom of Jerusalem where he held Galilee, and assumed the regency for underage kings twice. His conflicts with the Jerusalemite king Guy of Lusignan (d. 1192) prompted his alliance with Saladin (d. 1193) who had united Egypt and much of Syria, but Raymond was reconciled with Guy shortly before Saladin's complete victory in the Battle of Hattin. Although Raymond fled from the battlefield, he died of an illness. He named his godson, the Antiochene crown prince Raymond (d. 1199), as his successor.

== Background ==
The city of Tripoli was one of the last Byzantine outposts on the Syrian coast of the Mediterranean Sea during the early Muslim conquests; it surrendered in 645. Syria was a central province of the Muslim Caliphate, but the Abbasid caliphs' control of the region faded away towards the end of the 9th century. In the next century, the Fatimids (from Egypt) conquered much of Syria. Unlike the Sunnite Abbasids, they were Shiite who rejected the Abbasids' claim to rule, regarding themselves as imāms (legitimate supreme heads of the Muslim community). Tripoli, the Fatimids' northernmost Syrian possession, was regularly approached by Byzantine troops. In response, the Fatimids heavily fortified the city and provided it with a permanent garrison c. 1050. In the mid-11th century, much of Syria was seized by the Seljuk Turks, a loose confederation of nomadic Sunnite Turkic groups, known as Turkomans. Although Tripoli remained under the Fatimids' nominal rule, it emerged as an autonomous lordship headed by a native family of qadis (judges), the Banu Ammar c. 1070.

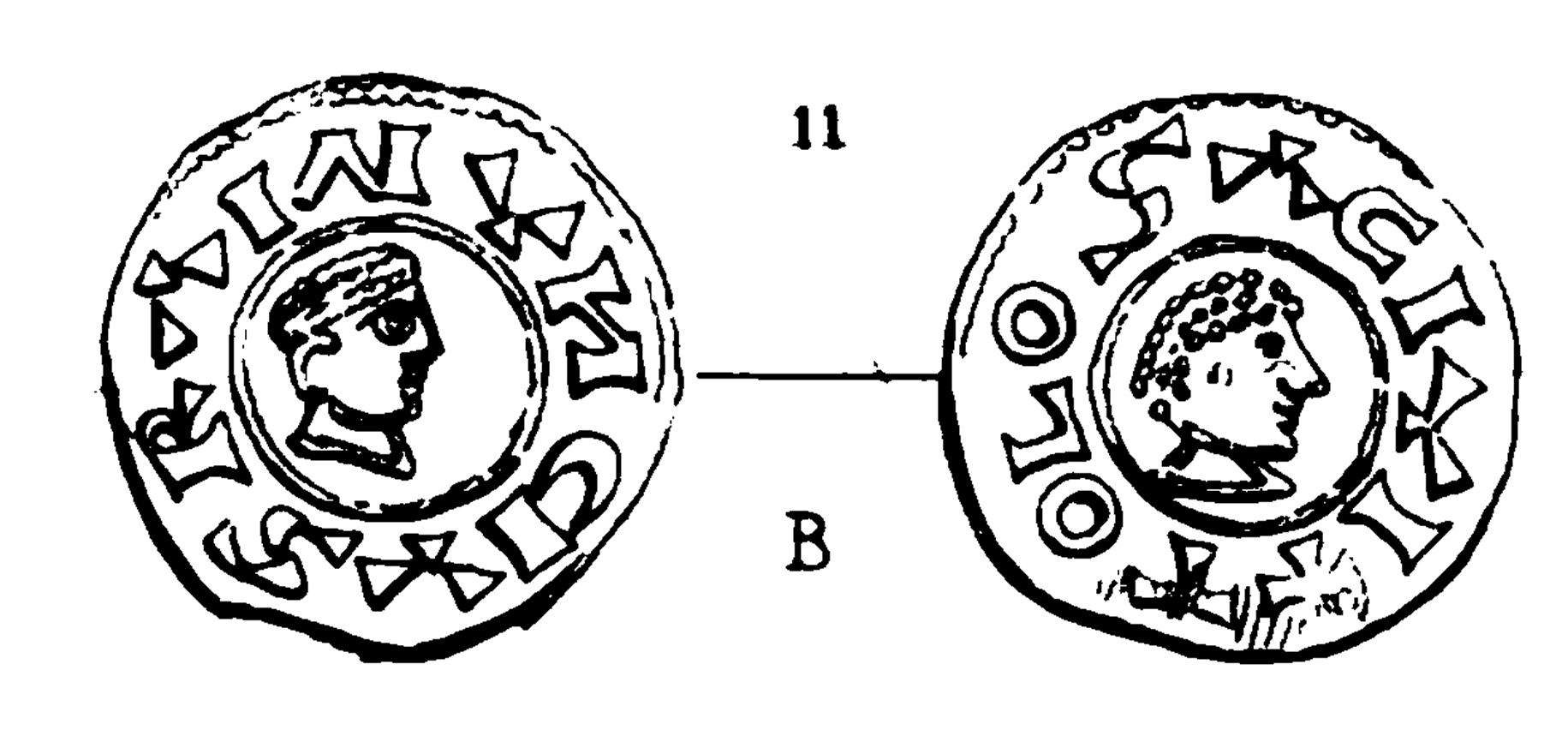
A coin of Raymond of Saint-Gilles

Facing foreign invasions from all directions, the Byzantines could not resist the Turkomans who in Anatolia. Although mutual excommunications had revealed a serious rift between the western (or Catholic) and eastern (or Orthodox) branches of Christianity, the Byzantine Emperor Alexios I Komnenos (r. 1081–1118) sought the support of Pope Urban II (r. 1088–1099) in mustering western troops against the invaders. In response, Urban called for a military campaign for the liberation of fellow Christians and the Holy City of Jerusalem at Clermont in November 1095. His call, as the historian Malcolm Barber summarises, "set motion a series of events that ... led to the assembly of nine major armies from a very wide geographical area"; these included 50,000–60,000 people, according to modern estimations. Raymond of Saint-Gilles, the wealthy count of Toulouse (r. 1094–1105) was the first aristocrat to join the expedition that would be known as the First Crusade. His wife, Elvira of Castile (d. 1151) accompanied him, indicating that he did not want to return to Europe.

The main crusader armies departed after 15 August 1096, and arrived at the Byzantine capital, Constantinople next spring. Here, all crusader leaders but Raymond took an oath of loyalty to Alexios and promised to return to him all former Byzantine lands that they would conquer from the Turkomans. (Note: Although Raymond refused the oath of fealty stating that he owed allegiance only to God, he pledged that he would not attack Alexios.) They inflicted major defeats on the Turkomans in Anatolia before reaching Antioch, once the capital of a Byzantine doukate (province) in northern Syria. They conquered the city in June 1098, but refused to cede it to Alexios's representatives. They were still besieging Antioch when the cleric Ebrard (who was, according to the historian Kevin J. Lewis, "likely in Raymond of Saint-Gilles's entourage") went to Tripoli to meet with the qadi Jalal al-Mulk Ali ibn Muhammad (r. 1072–1099). Their meetings' results are unknown, but Jalal al-Mulk frequently sent gifts to the crusaders to secure their good will. According to Raymond's chaplain, Raymond of Aguilers, Jalal al-Mulk even erected the Toulousian banner over Tripoli's forts; Lewis does not give credit to this report. In Antioch, the Italo-Norman crusader Bohemond (r. 1098–1111) assumed power. Raymond also seized lands in northern Syria but could not fully counterbalance Bohemond's ambitions. Their conflict led to a raprochement between Raymond and the Byzantines.

Most crusaders, including Raymond left northern Syria for Jerusalem early in 1099. Bohemond stayed behind and quickly seized Raymond's northern Syrian holdings. Raymond was planning to conquer Tripoli, but the common crusaders insisted on continuing the crusade towards Jerusalem. The crusaders captured Jerusalem on 15 July 1099. Raymond was one of the candidates to rule the Holy City, but another leader, Godfrey of Bouillon, Duke of Lower Lorraine was elected Jerusalem's first western (or Frankish) ruler (r. 1099–1100). Raymond returned to northern Syria in late 1099. Bohemond had attacked the Byzantine port city of Latakia, but now Raymond forced him to abandon the siege. The city was seized by Raymond on Alexios' behalf, thus he ruled what the historian Jean Richard labels as a "Byzanto-Provençal principality". In 1101, he went to Constantinople either to make contact with new crusader armies, or to secure Alexios' consent to an attack against Tripoli. Raymond joined the new crusaders but the Turkomans nearly annihilated them. He fled to Constantinople, and agreed to return Latakia to the Byzantines, but Alexios sanctioned his plan to establish a lordship under Byzantine suzerainty. On his return to Syria, Raymond was forced to pledge to Tancred (d. 1112)—who administered Antioch on Bohemond's behalf—that he would not pursue his ambitions in the north. (Note: The chronicler Albert of Aix writes that Raymond specifically promised that he would not seize lands to the north of the city of Acre on the Palestinian coast. Lewis argues that Albert who never visited Syria misinterpreted his source and Raymond actually pledged that he would not claim lands to the north of the Syrian town of Arqa (as these lands were once encompassed in the Byzantine doukate of Antioch).)

== Establishment ==
=== Raymond I (1102–1105) ===
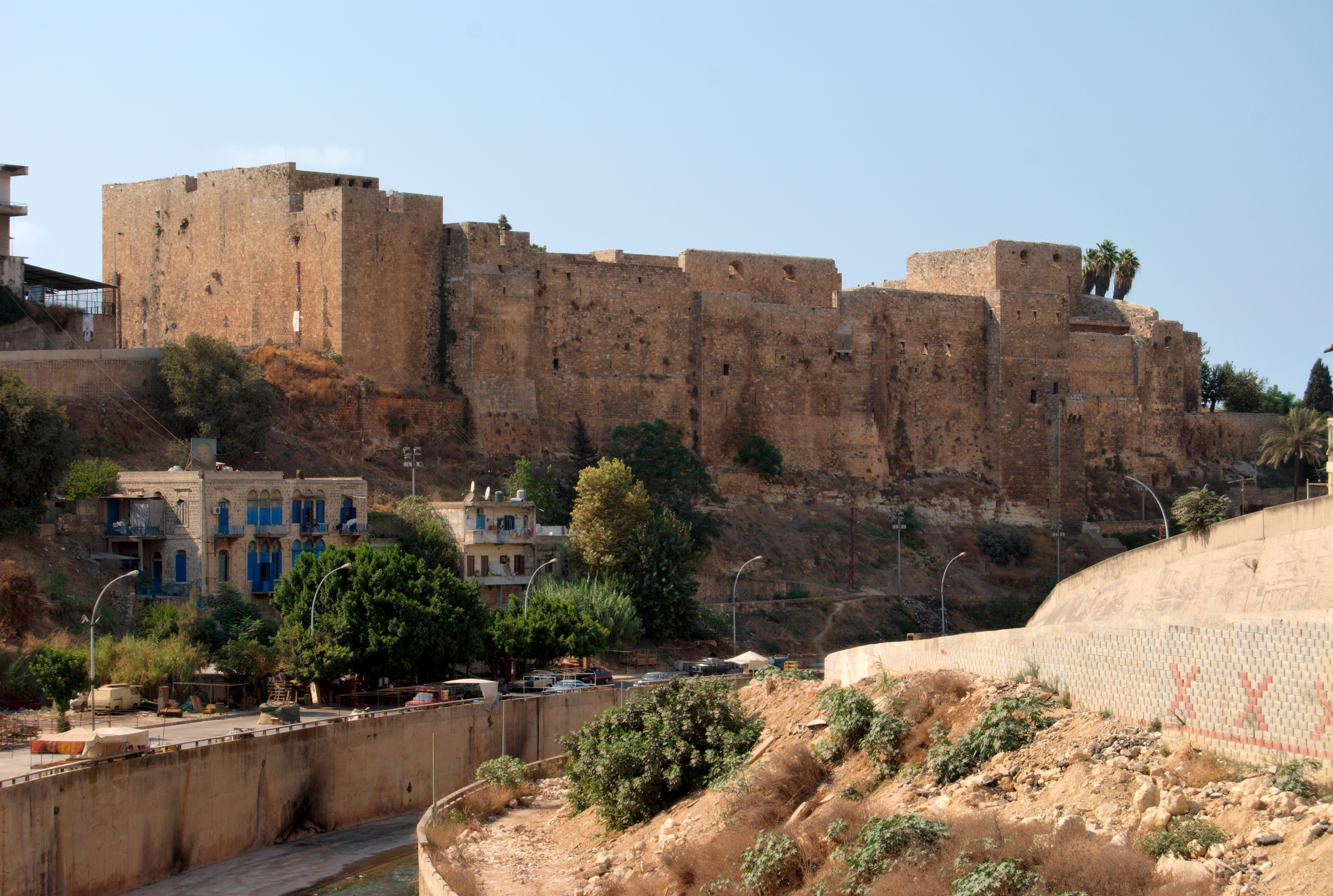
The crusaders' castle on Mount Pilgrim at the city of Tripoli, still known as Qalʻat Sān Jīl (Saint-Gilles's Castle) after Raymond of Saint-Gilles, Tripoli's first count

Raymond withdrew from northern Syria and captured the coastal town of Tortosa with the support of other survivors of the 1101 Crusade and a Genoese fleet in March 1102. He had concluded a truce with Jalal al-Mulk's successor, Fakhr al-Mulk ibn Ammar (r. 1099–1109), but attacked Tripoli at the latest in May 1103. He built a fortress on the nearby Mount Pilgrim using material that Eumathios Philokales (d. after 1118), the Byzantine governor of the island of Cyprus provided him. Mount Pilgrim quickly transformed into a flourishing commercial center competing with Tripoli. Raymond began to issue charters, levy taxes, and style himself "count of Tripoli, by the grace of God", but the city resisted the siege with the support of a Fatimid fleet. The nearby city of Homs was ruled by the Sunnite emir Janah ad-Dawla (d. 1103). When he was murdered by members of the Nizari (radical Shi'te) Order of Assassins, Raymund attacked the city, but it was quickly relieved by Damascene troops. Next year, he conquered the coastal town of Jubail to the south of Tripoli with Genoese naval assistance. He kept its two thirds, and ceded one third to the Genoese. In February 1105, Fakhr al-Mulk made a sortie and set fire to several buildings on Mount Pilgrim. Raymond, who was c. 70 years old, fell into a burning building, and died after ten days of sufferings on 28 February 1105.

=== William Jordan (1105–1109) ===
Raymond had two sons, but one of them, Bertrand was absent, ruling Toulouse, and the other, Alfonso Jordan was an infant, born on Mount Pilgrim. Alfonso Jordan was soon taken from Syria to Europe, and Raymond's distant cousin Willam Jordan (d. 1109) assumed the command of Raymond's army at Tripoli. His exact position—regent or count—is unclear but in his charters he styled himself as Raymond's heir. He regularly raided the villages around the town of Shaizar, forcing the native Christian peasants to pay a tribute to him. In great need of reinforcements, Fakhr al-Mulk left Tripoli to meet with the Seljuk sultan, Muhammad I Tapar (r. 1105–1118) in Baghdad, and the Seljuk atabeg (governor), Toghtekin (r. 1104–1128) in Damascus, but could not convince them to support him against the invaders. After his return, rioters forced him to flee from Tripoli, restoring the Fatimids' direct rule in the city. Meanwhile, William Jordan defeated a Damascene relief army and captured the town of Arqa in March or April 1109.

Around the same time, Bertrand, who had ceded Toulouse to Alfonso Jordan, came to join the siege at the head of a 4,000-strong army. He claimed Raymond's inheritance but William Jordan resisted with Tancred's support. In response, Bertrand accepted the suzerainty of Godfrey of Bouillon's successor, Baldwin I of Jerusalem (r. 1100–1118). Baldwin held a council at Tripoli in April, where Bertrand's claim to his father's Syrian lands was confirmed, but William Jordan was allowed to keep Tortosa and Arqa. The compromise was short-lived as William Jordan was murdered under unclear circumstances. Bertrand soon seized Arqa, but Tortosa was captured by Tancred.

== House of Toulouse ==
=== Bertrand (1109–1112) ===
Troops from all over the Latin East (the lands seized by the crusaders in the Near East) had assembled at the council of Tripoli. The presence of Genoese and Pisan fleets allowed the besiegers to blockade the city also from the sea. This forced the defenders to surrender to Baldwin I c. 26 June 1109. His grant of safe conduct to the Tripolitans did not prevent the Genoese from sacking the city. Bertrand reasserted his fealty to Baldwin declaring himself Baldwin's homo ligius (liege man). Grateful for the Genoese's support during the siege, he ceded Jubail's comital two thirds to them. These districts were seized by the Genoese crusader Hugh Embriaco.

According to the late 12th-century historian William of Tyre (d. 1186), the Latin East was divided into four crusader states—Jerusalem, Antioch, Edessa and Tripoli. In contrast, earlier sources (such as a decree attributed to the papal legate Adhemar of Le Puy (d. 1098), and a mid-12th-century author known as Pseudo-Fretellus) write of two states, Jerusalem and Antioch, divided by a river. Lewis tentatively associates it with the Arqa, the river marking the northern frontier of Bertrand's county after Tortosa was seized by Tancred, concluding that "the county of Tripoli at this point should not be regarded as a separate "crusader state", but rather Jerusalem's northernmost fief" on account of Bertrand's oath of fealty to the Jerusalemite king.

Shortly after Tripoli's conquest, the united forces of Toghtekin and the Seljuk commander Aqsunqur al-Bursuqi (d. 1126) routed Bertrand's army, but the war between Tripoli and its Muslim neighbors soon reached a stalemate. In a truce, Toghtekin ceded al-Munaytira and Akkar—two fortresses in the Beqaa Valley—to Tripoli, and agreed to share the region's tax revenues with Bertrand. Bertrand actively supported Baldwin's military ventures, participating in the sieges of Beirut and Sidon in 1110, and fighting Damascene invaders in Galilee in 1111. His relationship with Tancred remained tense. During the visit of the Byzantine envoy Manuel Boutoumites (d. after 1112) in the Latin East in late 1111, he promised to join a Byzantine invasion of Antioch. On this occasion, according to the Byzantine princess Anna Komnene (d. 1153), Bertrand confirmed his father's oath of fealty to Emperor Alexios. (Note: Accepting Albert of Aix's concurring report, the historian Ralph-Johannes Lilie proposes that Bertrand had already sworen fealty to Alexios in Constantinople during his travel towards Syria.)

=== Pons (1112–1137) ===
The Crusader states and their neighbors c. 1135

Bertrand who died unexpectedly of an illness was succeeded by his son Pons on 3 February 1112. Still a minor, Pons was sent to Antioch by his guardians. Lewis proposes that the Tripolitan lords wanted to get rid of the growing Jerusalemite demands for military assistance by seeking a rapprochement with Tancred. To clear the way for a full reconciliation between Antioch and Tripoli, Tancred granted Tortosa, the town of Maraclea, and the castles at Safita and Hisn al-Akrad (later known as Chastel Blanc and Crac des Chevaliers, respectively) in fief to Pons.

Although contemporary documents do not name Pons's guardians, they indicate that the constable Roger and Bishop Albert of Tripoli were among the heads of state administration. Pons was still in Tripoli, when with his consent Bishop Albert refused to return a large sum of money that Boutoumites had deposited with him. After the Byzantines threatened them with an embargo on Cypriote goods, Bishop Albert paid back the money and Pons took an oath of fealty to the Byzantine emperor. Pons was staying in Antioch when Tancred died on 12 December 1112. In accordance with Tancred's last will, Pons married his widow, Cecile of France (d. 1145). Her dowry included Arzghan and al-Ruj, two important Antiochene fortresses near the Orontes River. On the other hand, he lost the eastern Tripolitan town of Rafaniyya to Toghtekin in 1115.

Fulcher of Chartres on Baldwin II's expedition against Pons

...the king set out for Acre where he gathered his men, both footmen and horsemen. ... He intended to take revenge for the injury and contempt which the count of that region, Pons by name, had brought upon him by refusing to submit to him as Bertrand, the father of Pons, had done. But by the will of God and the conciliatory words of the nobles present on both sides the count listened to reason, and Baldwin and Pons were made friends with each other.

— Fulcher of Chartres, Gesta Francorum Iherusalem peregrinantium ("A history of the expedition to Jerusalem")

Pons fulfilled his feudal obligations towards the Jerusalemite kings, Baldwin I and Baldwin II (r. 1118–1131), for instance by fighting Bursuq of Hamadan in Antioch on Baldwin I's command in 1115. A Tripolitan charter of grant was dated in 1117 by reference to the number of years of Baldwin's reign, also indicating that Baldwin was regarded the suzerain in Tripoli. According to Lewis, Pons's absence from the 1120 Council of Nablus—an assembly of the Jerusalemite lords and prelates—was the first sign of his attempt to demonstrate his independence. Early in 1122, Pons openly disobeyed Baldwin II. Baldwin assembled the Jerusalemite army for an attack against his unruly vassal, but the conflict was resolved peacefully with the mediation of their retainers. As the contemporaneous historian Fulcher of Chartres summarises, Baldwin and Pons, "were again made friends". In comparison with his predecessors, Pons pursued a less warlike policy: whereas, in an average year, his grandfather had launched more than two attacks and his father made more than one invasions, he did not take up arms in each year.

In April 1123, Baldwin fell into Muslim captivity. In his absence, Pons was the Christian army's most prominent secular leader during the siege of Tyre, the Fatimids' northernmost port, that began in early next year with Venetian naval assistance. Tyre surrendered on 29 June 1124. Although Tyre was incorporated into the Jerusalemite kingdom, the Tripolitans also benefitted from the victory because the Fatimid fleet did not raid the county for nearly two decades. More than a year later, Baldwin supported Pons to attack the Muslim garrison at Rafaniyya. In the vicinity, they erected a new fortress, Montferrand to blockade the town, forcing the defenders to surrender. The constant Frankish threat reinforced the Muslims' desire for unity in the Near East. Aleppo and Mosul—two important centers of power in Syria and Iraq, respectively—were first united by the atabeg Aqsunqur al-Bursuqi (r. 1124–1126), and after his death by Imad al-Din Zengi (r. 1127–1146). In response, Baldwin II attacked Damascus after Toghtekin died in 1129. Pons joined the campaign along with other prominent Frankish leaders, such as Baldwin's sons-in-law Fulk V of Anjou (r. 1109–1129) and Bohemond II of Antioch (r. 1111–1130), but they could not conquer the city.

Bohemond II fell in a battle in February 1130, leaving an infant daughter Constance (r. 1130–1163) as his heir. Her mother Alice of Jerusalem (d. after 1151) wanted to take control of the principality with Zengi's support, but Baldwin II thwarted his daughter's plan and assumed the regency for Constance. After Baldwin died on 21 August 1131, his eldest daughter Melisende (r. 1131–1146) and her husband Fulk of Anjou (r. 1131–1143) succeeded him in Jerusalem. To prevent Fulk from also taking the place of Baldwin as regent in Antioch, Alice made an alliance with Pons, Joscelin II, Count of Edessa (r. 1131–1150), and a powerful Antiochene lord William of Zardana (d. 1132/33). Pons did not allow Fulk and his army to march across Tripoli towards Antioch. After the Jerusalemite forces reached Antioch by sea, Pons attacked them at Arzghan and al-Ruj. Under unknown circumstances, Fulk emerged victorious in the conflict and appointed the aristocrat Rainald I Masoir (d. c. 1135) to rule Antioch on his behalf. Lewis notes that "there is no indication that [Fulk] required the defeated Pons to reaffirm the allegiance he had once owed to the king of Jerusalem for the county".

In 1133, Zengi launched a plundering raid against Tripoli and nearly annihilated Pons's army at Rafaniyya. Pons sought Fulk's assistance, and after the arrival of the Jerusalemite reinforcements the Turkoman raiders withdrew from the county. By this time, the Nizari had begun expanding in the mountainous border region between Tripoli and Antioch. Discontent among the native population was also simmering. In 1132 or 1133, an unnamed ra'īs (native headman) of the capital city was executed on Pons's order. In the spring of 1137, the Damascene commander Bazawash invaded the county, reaching as far as Mount Pilgrim. After some hesitation, Pons made a sortie, but his army was decimated. William of Tyre writes that Pons was captured due to "treachery" of native Christians, and his captors murdered him on 25 March. His son Raymond II succeeded him.

=== Raymond II (1137–1152) ===
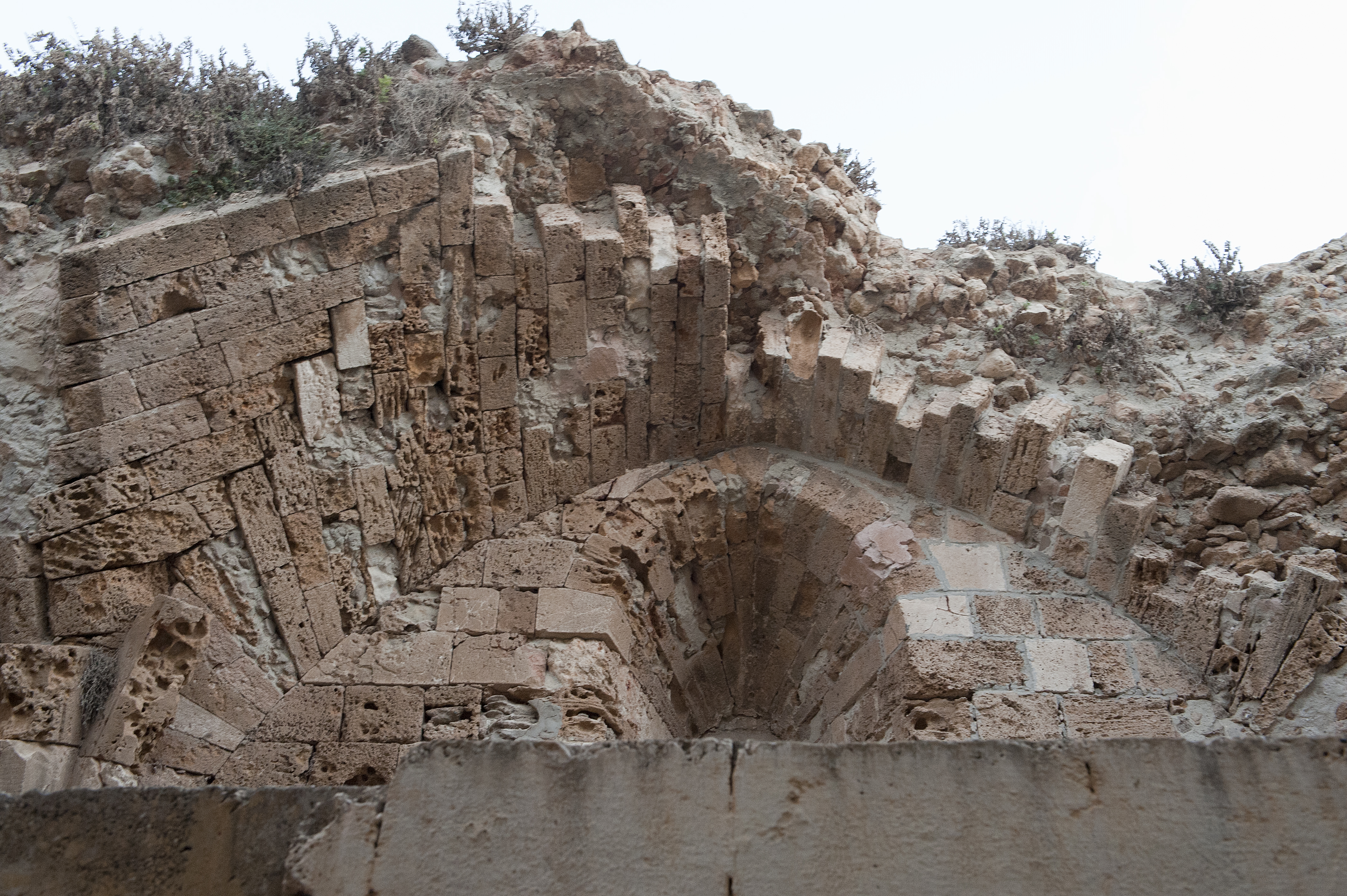
Ruins of the northern walls of the Templars' fortress in Tortosa

Raymond II assembled the remnants of the Tripolitan army and plundered the native Christian communities near Mount Lebanon in revenge for his father's death. Zengi launched a full-scale invasion of the county, forcing Raymond to plead for Fulk's assistance. They united their armies, but Zengi routed them near Montferrand on 11 July 1137. Raymond was captured, but Fulk fled to Montferrand. In late August, he came to an agreement with Zengi who granted a free passage to him and released Raymund in return for Montferrand, Rafaniyya, and 50,000 dinars. By this time, the arrival of a large Byzantine army under the command of Alexios I's son and successor, John II Komnenos (r. 1118–1143) to northern Syria had become Zengi's main concern. The Byzantine historian Niketas Choniates (d. 1217) writes that John came to support Antioch and Tripoli because he regarded their rulers as his "ligion" (liege men). The contemporary Byzantine author Theodore Prodromos (d. c. 115) explicitly states that Tripoli "was made subject" during John's reign. However, Tripolitan forces did not join the Byzantine army, likely because the county's military power had been exhausted, according to the historian Ralph-Johannes Lilie. The Byzantine campaign proved a failure at Shaizar in the spring of 1138, not independently of the Frankish rulers' unwillingness to fight in Byzantine service.

Zengi seized Homs from Damascus in October 1138, which led to what Lewis calls a "medieval outsourcing" in Tripoli—Raymond granted four fortresses (among them Hisn al-Akrad) along with some villages and a claim to Rafaniyya and Montferrand to the wealthy Knights Hospitaller in 1142. Originally a charitable confraternity, the Hospitallers had assumed military functions in the Latin East. Raymond's charter of grant exempted them from feudal duties, establishing their domains autonomy in the county. Three years later, the grant was confirmed by Queen Melisende and her son Baldwin III of Jerusalem (r. 1143–1163), and by Princess Constance and her husband Raymond of Poitiers (r. 1136–1149), showing that the Jerusalemite kings' and Antiochene princes' authority over parts of the county was still remembered. The 1142 charter lists the Tripolitan chancellor, marshal and constable, which is "a clear indication" of "an established administrative structure" for the historian Malcolm Barber.

Zengi conquered the city of Edessa in late December 1144, which provoked a new crusade. Alfonso Jordan (who had consolidated his rule in Toulouse) was one of the western leaders to join the campaign but he died unexpectedly after landing at Palestine in 1148. According to William of Tyre, the Frankish leaders suspected poisoning. Tyre does not name the suspect, but Alfonso Jordan, as Barber notes, "might have been seen as a rival of" Raymond II. After the crusade turned into a fiasco during the siege of Damascus, most westerners returned to Europe. Alfonso Jordan's bastard son Bertrand (d. after 1159) was one of the few to stay behind. He seized al-'Arimah, a fort to the north of Tortosa, but the united forces of Zengi's successor, Nur al-Din (r. 1146–1174), and the Damascene atabeg Unur (r. 1140–1149) captured him in September 1148. A Muslim historian, Ibn al-Athir (d. 1233) claims that Raymond had urged the Muslim rulers to attack his kinsman. Barber and Lewis tend to give credit to this report, for Bertrand's possession of the fortress posed a direct threat to Raymond's authority. Raymond granted al-'Ariman to the Knights Templar, establishing the presence of the Hospitallers' powerful rivals in the county.

In the summer of 1151, a Fatimid fleet pillaged the coastal towns, reaching as far as Tripoli. Next summer, Nur al-Din sacked Tortosa and his troops destroyed the city's fortifications. As Raynard of Maraqiyya, lord of Tortosa, could not finance their restoration, Raymond granted the city first to the local bishop, then to the Templars. Meanwhile, Raymond and his wife Hodierna of Jerusalem (d. c. 1162) had become estranged due to what William of Tyre describes as "marital jealousy". During an assembly of the Frankish leaders at Tripoli, Queen Melisende tried to reconcile them, but Hodierna decided to leave Tripoli for Jerusalem. Shortly after her departure, two Assassins murdered Raymond at the gates of Tripoli for unknown reason. His assassination led to a pogrom against the city's native population which was halted by Baldwin III who had not left the city after the general assembly.

=== Raymond III (1152–1187) ===
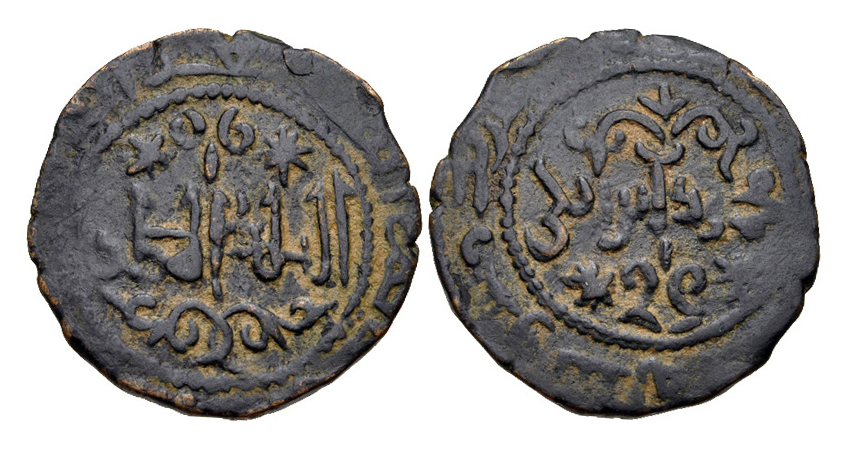
Coin minted for Nur al-Din Zengi in Damascus in the 1160s

Raymond was succeeded by his twelve-year-old son Raymond III. He grew up in Jerusalem and only returned to the county when reached the age of majority in 1155. (Note: It is unclear who administered Tripoli during Raymond's minority. The Tripolitan lords swore fealty to Hodierna and her two children, Raymond and Melisende on Baldwin III's order which suggests to Lewis that she assumed power after her husband's death.) Meanwhile, Nur al-Din had seized Damascus, thus uniting much of the Syrian Muslim states. Syria was hit by a devastating earthquake in August 1157. In the county, Arqa, Crac des Chevaliers, and the capital city were heavily damaged. The Jewish traveller Benjamin of Tudela who visited Tripoli some years later noted that many townspeople had perished during the catastrophe, "for houses and walls fell upon them". In October, Thierry, Count of Flanders (r. 1128–1168) came to the Latin East for a crusade. Raymond persuaded him to jointly attack Chastel Rouge (an unidentified fortress defended by a Muslim garrison), but they could not take it. In the same year, French monks from Morimond established Belmont Abbey, the first Cistercian monastery in the Latin East, near the small port town of Nephin.

The Byzantine Emperor Manuel I Komnenos (r. 1143–1180) decided to forge a marriage alliance with the Latin East. He requested Baldwin III to offer him a Frankish bride and Baldwin chose Raymond's sister, Melisende (d. after 1160). Her family spent huge amounts of money for jewelry and a fleet to escort her to Constantinople, but for unclear reasons Manuel eventually decided to marry Melisende's Antiochene relative, Maria (d. 1182). (Note: Manuel's biographer John Kinnamos (d. after 1185) writes that Melisende was in a poor health and rumours about her illegitimacy were spreading.) Outraged by the humiliation of his sister, Raymond manned his new fleet with criminals, instructing them to launch plundering raids against Byzantine territory. In summer 1164, Nur al-Din attacked the important Antiochene fortress of Harim. This prompted a wide coalition of Frankish, Byzantine and Cilician Armenian rulers, including Raymond, but Nur al-Din inflicted a major defeat upon them on 10 August 1164. Raymond was captured and imprisoned.

Raymond spent ten years in captivity in Aleppo. In his absence, Baldwin III's brother and successor Amalric of Jerusalem (r. 1163–1174) assumed the regency as "administrator of the county of Tripoli" with Raymond's consent. Lilie says that a Tripolitan aristocrat, Raynald of Nephin served "as a kind of liaison man between the people of Tripoli and Amalric". (Note: The historian Wipertus Hugo Rudt de Collenberg associates Raynald of Nephin with Raynard who had held Tortosa until 1151. Lewis adds that Raynald had received Nephin in compensation for Tortosa, destroyed by Nur al-Din's troops.) Raynald accompanied Amalric during his state visit to Constantinople in 1171. Amalric went to the Byzantine capital to secure Manuel's support for a joint Byzantine–Frankish invasion of Egypt. He had already twice invaded Egypt, for he wanted to prevent Nur al-Din from conquering the declining Fatimid Caliphate. To thwart Amalric's Egyptian ambitions, Nur al-Din launched two major invasions of Tripoli in this period (in 1165 or 1166, and in 1167). Early in 1169, his Kurdish commander Shirkuh (d. 1169) was appointed as vizier by the Fatimid caliph. When Shirkuh died, his nephew Saladin (d. 1193) succeeded him who put an end to the Fatimid caliphate. His relationship with Nur al-Din quickly deteriorated due to fiscal conflicts. In June 1170, a new devastating earthquake caused much damage in northern Syria, also hitting the city of Tripoli, and the fortresses of Arqa, Chastel Blanc, Crac des Chevaliers, and Urayama. Amalric soon granted Arqa and an other fortress Gibelacar to the Hospitallers.

Nur al-Din released Raymond for 80,000 dinars, allowing him to pay two thirds of the ransom later. Raymond left Aleppo before 18 April 1174 when he witnessed a royal charter in the town of Acre. Amalric arranged Raymond's marriage with the widowed Princess of Galilee, Eschiva of Bures (d. after 1187), which made Raymond the most powerful lord in the Kingdom of Jerusalem. (Note: Barber writes that Raymond married Eschiva only after King Amalric's death.) In 1174, both Nur al-Din and Amalric died and were succeeded by underage sons, As-Salih (r. 1174–1181) and Baldwin IV (r. 1174–1185), respectively. In Jerusalem, Raymond claimed the regency as the young king's closest male relative but the Jerusalemite lords sanctioned his claim only after unidentified assassins murdered his rival the constable Miles of Plancy (d. 1174). In Aleppo, the eunuch Gümüshtekin (d. 1177) assumed power on As-Salih's behalf. After Saladin seized Damascus and Hama and attacked Homs, Gümüshtekin offered an alliance to the Franks, but Raymond chose to sign a truce with Saladin who released the hostages held as guarantee for the payment of his full ransom. Raymond's regency ended when Baldwin reached the age of majority in July 1176.

Philip I, Count of Flanders (r. 1168–1191) and his sizeable army of crusaders landed at Acre in July 1177. He, Raymond and troops from Jerusalem and Antioch attacked Hama but they abandoned the siege early in next year for Philip wanted to return to Flanders. Saladin continued his war against Nur al-Din's relatives but also made occasional inroads into the Frankish states. On one occasion, he routed a Frankish army led by Raymond, Baldwin, and the Templars' grand master Odo of St Amand (d. 1180) near Marj Ayyun. On Easter 1180, Raymond and the Antiochene prince Bohemond III (r. 1163–1201) unexpectedly came to Jerusalem, each leading a sizeable army. Their motivation is unknown, but Baldwin whose health was quickly deteriorating feared of a coup in favour of his sister Sibylla (d. 1192). To thwart their plans, Baldwin hastily married off her to the French aristocrat Guy of Lusignan (d. 1194). Raymond and Bohemond soon left the kingdom.

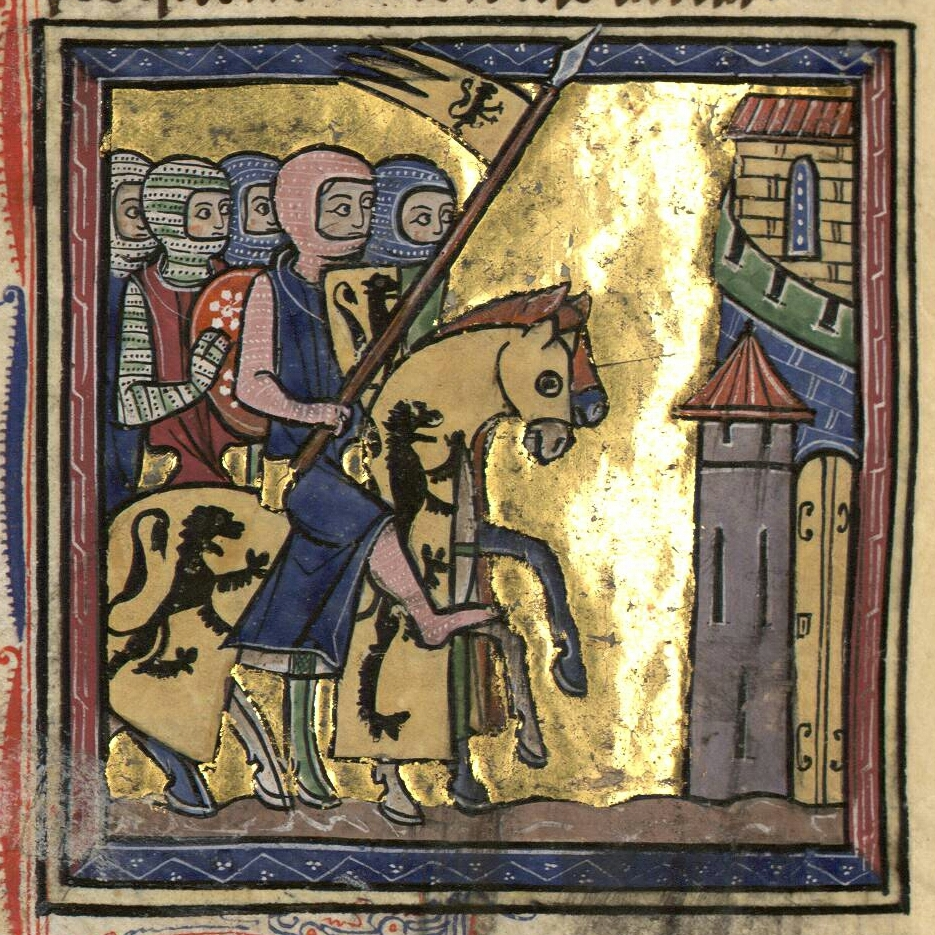
Raymond and Bohemond III of Antioch ride to Jerusalem in early 1180.

Saladin invaded Tripoli, forcing Raymond to take refugee in Arqa while Saladin's troops freely pillaged the nearby fertile lands. Saladin's fleet also attacked Tortosa, forcing Raymond to signed a truce. To improve his county's defences, Raymond granted new lands to the Hospitallers and allowed one of his vassals, William of Maraqiyya to cede three small forts to the Templars. During this period, the Italian city-states' interest in the Latin East intensified. From 1179, Pope Alexander III (r. 1159–1181) and his successors frequently requested Raymond to take actions against the Embriaci who had ignored the Genoese's privileges in Jubail. Around 1180, Raymond gave the heiress of the Lordship of Botrun to a wealthy merchant from Pisa, Plivain (d. c. 1206). According to a later source, known as Estoire d'Eracles, Raymond had promised her hand to a Flemish crusader Gerard of Ridefort (d. 1189) but broke his word when Plivain offered a large sum to him for her.

Relationship between Baldwin IV and his brother-in-law had deteriorated to the point that Baldwin disinherited Sibylla in favor of her five-year-old son Baldwin V (r. 1183–1186). Raymond was again appointed as regent but both Baldwins died in less than two years. Raymond could not prevent the coronation of Sibylla and Guy, but he rejected to do homage to the new royal couple. He withdrew to his Galilean seat, Tiberias, and sought Saladin's protection against Guy. Ibn al-Athir writes that Saladin offered to make Raymond "independent king of the Franks one and all" in return for an alliance. When Saladin invaded Jerusalem, a delegation of Frankish lords convinced Raymond to do homage to Guy and join the Jerusalemite field army. Saladin nearly annihilated the Frankish troops at Hattin on 4 July 1187. Raymond was one of the few Frankish commanders to flee from the battlefield, but many prominent Tripolitan lords were captured, such as Plivain of Botrun, Hugh II of Jubail, and Melioret of Maraqiyya Saladin's troops seized Jubail, and likely also Botrun early in August. Raymond first fled to Tyre, then to Tripoli where he died of illness in early autumn. On his deathbed, he bequeathed his county to Bohemond III's eldest son Raymond who was his godson. (Note: The younger Raymond had commanded the reinforcements, fifty knights, from Antioch at Hattin, and fled from the battlefield with his godfather.)

== House of Poitou ==
=== Bohemond I (1187–1233) ===
The medievalist Hans Eberhard Mayer writes that a by now lost seal's inscription indicates that the younger Raymond indeed assumed power in the county (or at least adopted the comital title) for a short period. This view is accepted by the historian Jochen Burgtorf, but an other specialist Andrew D. Buck regards it "tenuous". For him, a charter mentioning that Tripolitan lords accompanied Bohemond III to Tyre in March 1189 indicates that Raymond's father ruled the county for more than a year. A fragmentary charter contains the earliest, although unclear, reference to Raymond's younger brother Bohemond I ruling in Tripoli in March 1189. Buck says that the "apparent crossover" of the two documents indicates that the elder Bohemond had appointed his namesake as count but "retained a guiding hand over Tripolitan matters to ensure stability". Bohemond III selected his younger son (who had been born in 1177) to reign in Tripoli because his elder son was his heir to Antioch, a principality also exposed to frequent invasions.

Saladin conquered much of the Latin East in the aftermath of the Battle of Hattin. As Tripoli was one of the few cities to resist, thousands of Frankish refugee seekers were swarming to it. The contemporary historian Ernoul accuses Tripoli's (unnamed) count of inhumanity for not allowing them to enter the city. Lewis supposes that the refugee seekers were denied shelter because the "county's government" was "unable to cope with such a huge influx of people". (Note: According to the source's alternative version, not the Tripolitan count, but one of his vassals Raynard of Nephin attacked the refugees.) Tyre emerged as the center of Frankish resistance on the ruins of the Kingdom of Jerusalem under the command of the Italian crusader Conrad of Montferrat (d. 1192). When Saladin attacked Tyre in November 1187, the Tripolitans sent ships to help their fellow Christians but a storm destroyed the fleet. Saladin decided to attack Tripoli but the arrival of nearly sixty galleys under the command of the Sicilian admiral Margaritus of Brindisi (d. 1195) saved the city. Bohemond III was forced to sign an eight-month truce with Saladin in late September 1188. By this time, Saladin troops had conquered the whole county save the city of Tripoli and Crac des Chevaliers. The Third Crusade secured the crusader states' survival, allowing Bohemond III to sign a new truce with Saladin in Beirut on 30 October 1192. The truce covered both Antioch and Tripoli for ten years. Saladin died in 1193, and his empire disintegrated into smaller polities each ruled by his sons, brothers, or nephews collectively known as the Ayyubids. Among them, Saladin's brother Al-Adil I (r. 1196–1218) united Egypt and Damascus, but his nephews (Saladin's sons), especially Al-Zahir Ghazi of Aleppo (r. 1193–1216), regarded his growing power with hostility.

The younger Bohemond married the Tripolitan noblewoman, Plaisance Embriaco (d. 1217) to forge a marriage link with the county's aristocracy. Raymond died in 1197 but his widow, the Cilician Armenian princess Alice (d. after 1234) gave birth to a posthumous son Raymond-Roupen (d. c. 1220). In 1198 or 1199, the younger Bohemond marched from Tripoli to Antioch, demanding that he should be declared his father's heir as the closest male relative instead of the infant Raymond-Roupen who had been taken to Cilician Armenia by Alice. Bohemond's claim was sanctioned by the Commune of Antioch. The commune also swore an oath of fealty to him but Alice's uncle, the Cilician Armenian king Leo I (r. 1187–1219) restored the elder Bohemond's rule by force. The younger Bohemond returned to Antioch for the funeral of his father who had died in April 1201. The commune acknowledged him as his father's successor but many Antiochene noblemen fled to Cilician Armenia for they regarded Raymond-Roupen as the late prince's lawful heir. Due to bitter regional conflicts involving both Christian and Muslim rulers and rebellious aristocrats, the disagreement about Bohemond III's succession developed into a series of armed conflicts collectively known as the War of the Antiochene Succession. It lasted for nearly two decades, for neither of the two main actors, Bohemond and Leo, could control both Antioch and his power base—in Tripoli and Cilician Armenia, respectively—for a longer period. In 1203, Bohemond was forced to return to Tripoli to deal with a revolt by Renart of Nephin who had married an aristocratic heiress Isabel of Akkar without his consent. As Renart was backed by both Leo and Aimery, king of Cyprus and Jerusalem (r. 1196–1205), but after Aimery's death could not resist Bohemond who captured Nephin and Akkar by the end of 1206. Meanwhile, the Hospitallers attacked Montferrand but Al-Mansur I Muhammad, the Ayyubid emir of Hama (r. 1191–1221), defeated them but they did not stop attacking the northern Syrian Ayyubids' emirates.

During the war's first phase, Al-Zahir was Bohemond's principal ally, for Al-Adil's power posed a threat to both Aleppo and Tripoli. However, the Hospitallers' expansionism outraged Al-Zahir and his kin, which brought about a reconciliation between them and Al-Adil, sealed by a marriage alliance when Al-Zahir wed Al-Adil's daughter Dayfa Khatun (d. 1241) in 1212. Next year, Assassins killed Bohemond's heir Raymond (d. 1213) in Tortosa. The vengeful Bohemond besieged the Nizari's fortress Al-Khawabi in 1214. After the Nizari's appeal for support, Al-Zahir's troops attacked Bohemond at Al-Khawabi, and Al-Adil's army pillaged the county's southern regions. In Antioch, support for Bohemond had declined, especially because he mainly stayed in Tripoli for it was more prosperous than the principality's capital. Taking advantage of the discontent among the Antiochene, Leo captured the city and installed Raymond-Roupen as the new prince in February 1216. Unable to reclaim Antioch, Bohemond joined the Fifth Crusade. As he had been widowed, he married Melisende (d. after 1249), the sister of King Hugh I of Cyprus (r. 1205–1218). He also fought Ayyubid raiders who pillaged his county in 1218.

== Sources ==
=== Primary sources ===
- Benjamin of Tudela (2005). The Itinerary of Benjamin of Tudela: Travels in the Middle Ages. Translated by Michael A. Signer; Marcus Nathan Adler; Adolph Asher. Nightingale Resources. ISBN 978-0-9113-8909-8.
- Fulcher of Chartres (1969). Harold S. Fink (ed.). A History of the Expedition to Jerusalem, 1095–1127. Translated by Frances Rita Ryen, SSJ. The University of Tennessee Press. SBN 87049-097-4.

=== Secondary sources ===
- Barber, Malcolm (2012). The Crusader States. Yale University Press. ISBN 978-0-300-11312-9.
- Buck, Andrew D. (2017). The Principality of Antioch and Its Frontiers in the Twelfth Century. The Boydell Press. ISBN 978-1-78327-173-3.
- Burgtorf, Jochen (2016). "The Antiochene War of Succession". In Boas, Adrian J. (ed.). The Crusader World. The Routledge Worlds. Routledge. pp. 196–211. ISBN 978-0-415-82494-1.
- Donner, Fred M. (1999). "Muhammad and the Caliphate: Political History of the Islamic Empire up to the Mongol Conquest". In Esposito, John L. (ed.). The Oxford History of Islam. Oxford University Press. pp. 1–61. ISBN 978-0-19-510799-9.
- Gibb, Sir Hamilton A. R. (1969). "The Aiyūbids". In Wolff, Robert Lee; Hazard, Harry W. (eds.). The Later Crusades, 1189–1311. A History of the Crusades. Vol. Two (second ed.). The University of Wisconsin Press. pp. 693–714. ISBN 978-0-299-04844-0.
- Hardwicke, Mary Nickerson (1969). "The Crusader States, 1192–1243". In Wolff, Robert Lee; Hazard, Harry W. (eds.). The Later Crusades, 1189–1311. A History of the Crusades. Vol. Two (second ed.). The University of Wisconsin Press. pp. 522–555. ISBN 978-0-299-04844-0.
- Holt, P. M. (2004). The Crusader States and their Neighbours, 1098–1291. Pearson Longman. ISBN 978-0-582-36931-3.
- Jotischky, Andrew (2017) [2004]. Crusading and the Crusader States (Second ed.). Routledge. ISBN 978-1-138-80806-5.
- Köhler, Michael A. (2013). Konrad Hirschler (ed.). Alliances and Treaties between Frankish and Muslim Rulers in the Middle East: Cross-Cultural Diplomacy in the Period of the Crusades. The Muslim World in the Age of the Crusades: Studies and Texts. Translated by Peter M. Holt. BRILL. ISBN 978-90-04-24857-1.
- Lewis, Kevin James (2017). The Counts of Tripoli and Lebanon in the Twelfth Century: Sons of Sant-Gilles. Rulers of the Latin East. Routledge. ISBN 978-1-4724-5890-2.
- Lilie, Ralph-Johannes (2004). Byzantium and the Crusader States, 1096–1204. Translated by J. C. Morris; Jean E. Ridings. Clarendon Press. ISBN 978-0-19-820407-7.
- Lock, Peter (2006). The Routledge Companion to the Crusades. Routledge Companion to History. Routledge. ISBN 978-0-415-39312-6.
- Mayer, Hans Eberhard (1991). Varia Antiochena: Studien zum Kreuzfahrerfürstentum Antiochia im 12. und frühen 13. Jahrhundert [Varia Antiochena: Studies on the Crusader Principality of Antioch in the Twelfth and Early Thirteenth Centuries]. Monumenta Germaniae historica: Studien und Texte (in German). Vol. 6. Hahnsche Buchhandlung. ISBN 978-3-7752-5406-9.
- Morton, Nicholas (2020). The Crusader States and their Neighbours: A Military History, 1099–1187. Oxford University Press. ISBN 978-0-19-882454-1.
- Rudt de Collenberg, W. H. (1964). "Les «Raynouard», seigneurs de Nephin et de Maraclé en Terre sainte, et leur parenté en Languedoc" [The "Raynouards", Lords of Nephin and Maraclé in the Holy Land, and their Relatives in Languedoc]. Cahiers de civilisation médiévale (in French). 7 (27): 289–311. ISSN 0007-9731.
