= Council of Tripoli =

1109 meeting of crusader states' leaders

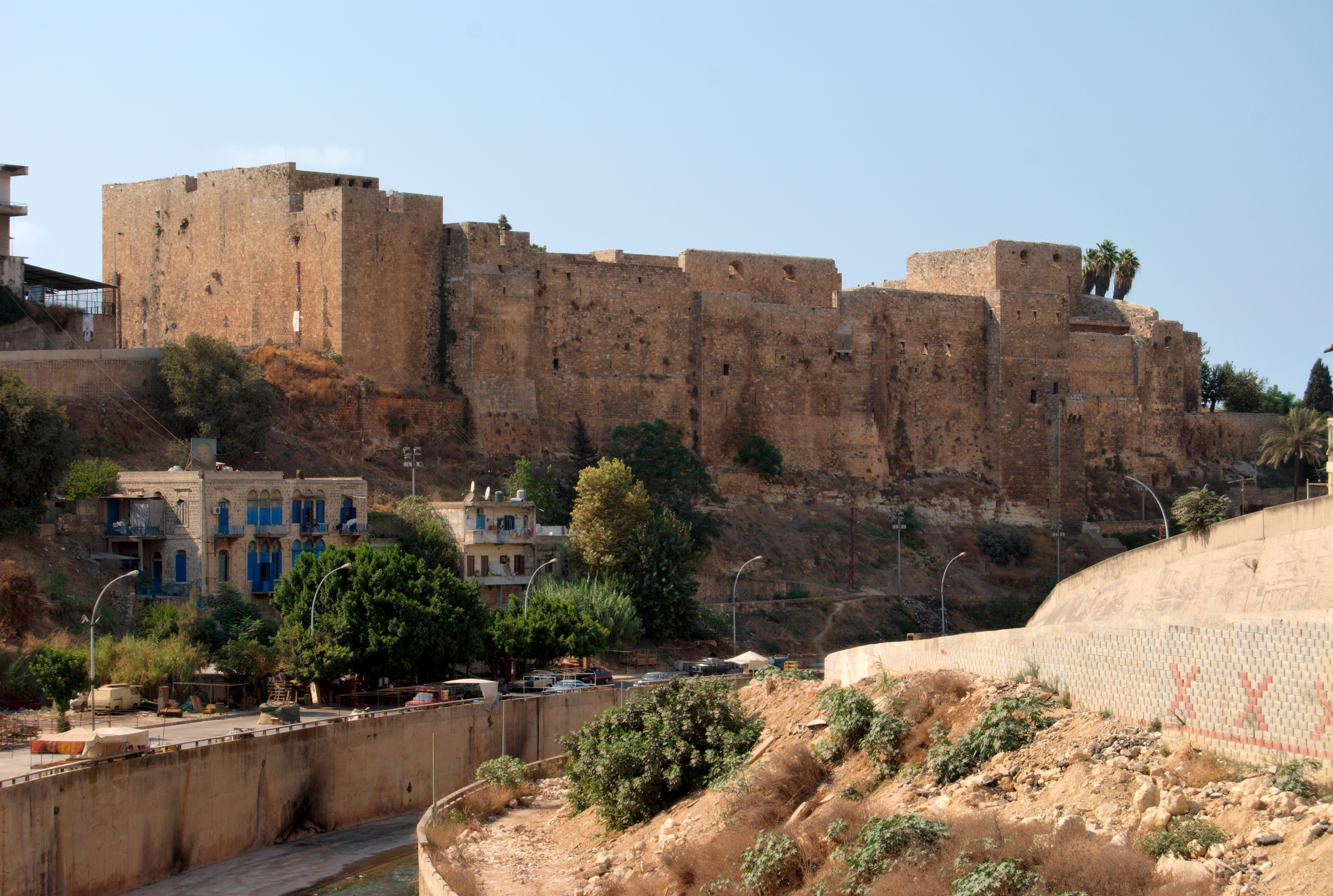
The crusaders' castle on Mount Pilgrim built near the city of Tripoli when Count Raymond started its siege in 1103

The Council of Tripoli was an assembly of crusader states' leaders held in 1109, towards the end of the prolonged siege of the city of Tripoli. The crusader states—Jerusalem, Antioch, Edessa, and the nascent Tripoli—had been established on lands in the Levant conquered by western European aristocrats during and in the aftermath of the First Crusade. In early 1109, Jerusalem was ruled by King Baldwin I, Edessa by his vassal Count Baldwin II, Antioch by Tancred as regent for the absent Prince Bohemond, and the lands around Tripoli by William Jordan who had assumed the command of the troops besieging the city after the death of his kinsman Count Raymond. The relationship between Tancred and Baldwin II was tense because Tancred had seized lands in the County of Edessa and refused to restore them to Baldwin. In April, Raymond's son, Bertrand, arrived in the Levant at the head of 4,000-strong army. He laid claim to lands held by Tancred and William Jordan, stating that he had inherited them from his father. William Jordan swore fealty to Tancred to secure his protection, whereas Bertrand accepted the suzerainty of King Baldwin I.

In response to Bertrand and Baldwin II's complaints against Tancred, King Baldwin summoned all parties to a council at the besiegers' camp in Tripoli in the name of the "church of Jerusalem". The council provided him with an opportunity to show his authority, but it also demonstrated the tight bonds between the crusader state rulers. At the council, the leaders agreed on a compromise—the lands around Tripoli were divided between Bertrand and William Jordan, and Tancred was ordered to restore the usurped lands to Baldwin II, but received the Principality of Galilee in Jerusalem in fief from King Baldwin. William Jordan was murdered under unknown circumstances shortly after the council, but his whole lordship was seized by Tancred by 1111. Shortly after William Jordan's demise, on 12 July, the crusader states' united armies captured Tripoli. Until the middle of the 12th century, documents indicate that a river (in the historian Kevin J. Lewis's view, the Arqa) divided the County of Tripoli into two parts, with a southern region under Jerusalemite suzerainty, and a northern region held by the Tripolitan counts in fief of the Antiochene princes.

== Sources ==
The History of the Expedition to Jerusalem, a chronicle written by the German monk Albert of Aachen, contains most available information about the 1109 assembly held at the eastern Mediterranean city of Tripoli. Albert, who never visited the region, used accounts by those who had returned from the Levant, thus (as the historian Susan B. Edgington summarises) his chronicle has the "weaknesses of oral history", such as chronological and topographical inaccuracy. The medievalist Thomas S. Asbridge emphasises that "we cannot blindly trust the information recorded by Albert" and Albert's "accounts of reported speech" are certainly fabricated. There are further details of the council in William of Tyre's late-12th-century chronicle. Rivalries preceding the council are also mentioned by two contemporary historians, the Muslim Ibn al-Qalanisi, and the Armenian Matthew of Edessa. A scion of an influential Damascene family, Al-Qalanisi narrates the history of his hometown, and generally fails to give a detailed account of events occurring outside his immediate region. Matthew's Chronicle is an indispensable source of the history of northern Syria and neighboring lands. He proudly declares that he collected information from "respectable people".

== Background ==
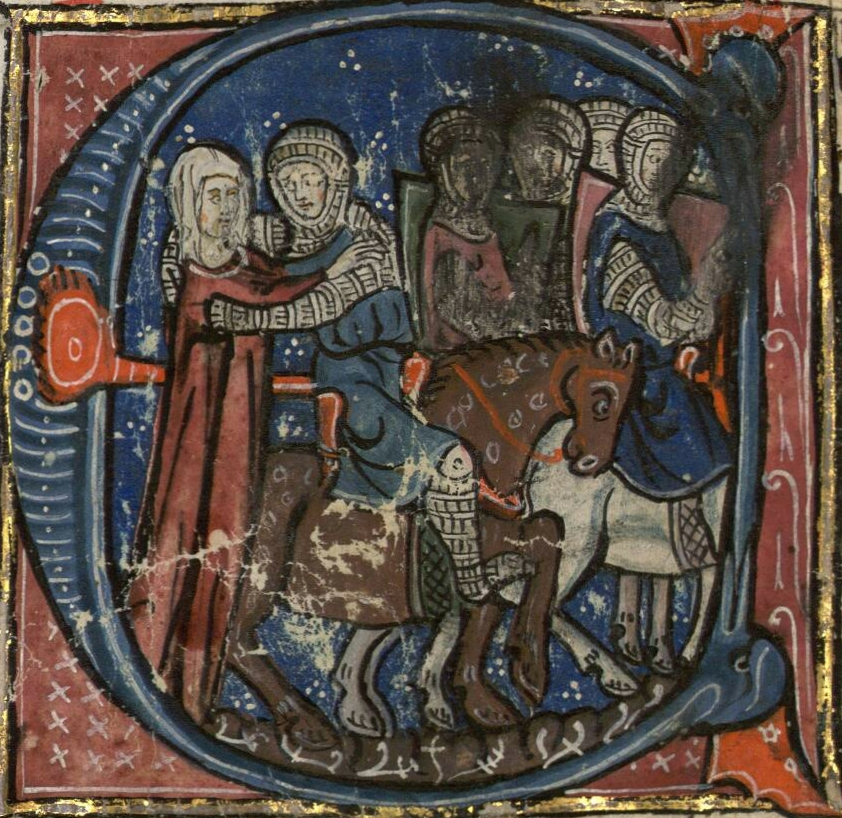
A 13th-century illustration of the Dowager Countess Ida bidding farewell to her sons, Godfrey and Baldwin of Bouillon, as they depart for the First Crusade in August 1096. Baldwin (the future King Baldwin I of Jerusalem) would preside over the council of Tripoli in 1109.

Tripoli, a wealthy Syrian port city, was governed in the late 11th century by the native Muslim Banu Ammar family, a line of qadis (judges). Syria, once contested by the Christian Byzantine Empire and the Muslim Fatimid Caliphate, had fragmented into autonomous lordships ruled by Arab or Turkoman warlords, tribal leaders, or princes. The Turkomans, a loose confederation of wandering Turkic groups from Central Asia, had seized much of the Near East and also attacked Byzantine Anatolia. The Byzantines sought military aid against the Turkoman threat from Pope Urban II, head of the Western (or Catholic) Church. Urban responded on 28 November 1095 at the Council of Clermont in France, calling for a campaign to aid fellow Christians.

Urban's appeal stirred widespread enthusiasm across Western Christendom, prompting tens of thousands—nobles, knights, and commoners alike—to join what became known as the First Crusade. Raymond of Saint-Gilles, the wealthy count of Toulouse, was among the first to join the campaign, appointing his son Bertrand to govern Toulouse. Godfrey of Bouillon, duke of Lower Lorraine sold or mortgaged much of his patrimony to fund his expedition. Bohemond of Taranto, an Italo-Norman prince, viewed the crusade as an opportunity to expand his power. Leading nobles commanded their own armies, made up of vassals, less well-off neighbours and relatives; Godfrey was joined by his brother, Baldwin of Boulogne, and cousin Baldwin of Bourcq, Bohemond by his nephew Tancred.

The First Crusade led to the creation of four Crusader states in the Levant, ruled by westerners known collectively as Franks. The first, the County of Edessa, was founded in early in 1098 by Baldwin of Boulogne on both sides of the Euphrates River. The Principality of Antioch followed after the capture of the city in June 1098. Bohemond claimed it as a reward for leading the siege, though Raymond also attempted to establish his own principality in northern Syria—an effort soon undone by Bohemond's consolidation of power. In early 1099, Raymond attempted to seize the Banu Ammar's lordship, but the lower-class crusaders refused to support an attack on Tripoli. A third Crusader state emerged with the conquest of Jerusalem on 15 July 1099. Although some, especially clergy, advocated clerical rule, the majority chose Godfrey as the city's first Frankish ruler. He ruled what would become the Kingdom of Jerusalem in Palestine but declined the title of king.

== Internal conflicts ==
In September 1099, Archbishop Daimbert of Pisa arrived in the Levant leading a fleet of 120 ships. Before the end of the year, he came to Jerusalem accompanied by Bohemond of Antioch and Baldwin of Edessa. He was elected as the city's Catholic patriarch, and both Godfrey and Bohemond did homage to him. After Godfrey died of an illness in July 1100, Daimbert renewed the idea of transforming Jerusalem into an ecclesiastic state. He sought Bohemond's support against Godfrey's retainers who regarded Baldwin as Godfrey's lawful heir, but Bohemond was captured by an Anatolian Muslim ruler. Baldwin installed Baldwin of Bourcq as his successor and vassal in Edessa before leaving to claim Jerusalem. His opponents, including Tancred who ruled Galilee, could not stop him. He was crowned king by Daimbert on Christmas Day.

Latin East c. 1102

In early 1101, Tancred went to Antioch to assume the regency for Bohemond. He renounced Galilee but stipulated that he would regain it in fief from King Baldwin if he came back from Antioch within 15 months. Within a year, Tancred compelled Raymond to completely abandon his ambitions in northern Syria. Instead of leaving the Levant, Raymond allied with the Genoese, and they captured the Banu Ammar's port town of Tortosa in 1102. The next year, he built a fortified camp at Mount Pilgrim near Tripoli with Byzantine assistance, beginning the city's prolonged siege. Although the defenders resisted with naval support from Fatimid Egypt, Raymond styled himself as count of Tripoli in his charters. In 1104, he and his Genoese allies captured another port town, Jubayl.

Changes in the crusader states' governments were not uncommon. Count Baldwin II invested his cousin, Joscelin of Courtenay, with the Lordship of Turbessel, charging him with the defence of Edessa's western lands in 1102. Bohemond was ransomed, and his return to Antioch put an end to Tancred's regency in May 1103. Baldwin II's attempts to seize the fertile lands southeast of his capital prompted two nearby Turkoman rulers, Jikirmish of Mosul and the Artuqid leader Sokman to attack Edessa. Bohemond, Tancred, and Joscelin hurried to his rescue, but the Turkomans routed the Franks at Harran in May 1104. Baldwin II and Joscelin were captured, and Tancred assumed power in Edessa, but he returned to rule Antioch in autumn when Bohemond left his principality to muster new crusaders in Western Europe. Tancred appointed Bohemond's cousin, Richard of the Principate, as Edessa's new governor, transforming the county—a Jerusalemite fief—into an Antiochene protectorate. As Edessa provided the Antiochene rulers with a significant income, both Bohemond and Tancred were reluctant to achieve Baldwin II's release. (Note: Albert of Aachen writes that Edessa yielded a yearly income of more than 40,000 besants. He adds that King Baldwin requested Bohemond and Tancred to exchange a high-born captured Muslim woman for Count Baldwin, but they rejected him.) Back in Europe, Bohemond attacked the Byzantine Empire from the west, but the Byzantines defeated him at the city of Dyrrhachium in 1108. His subsequent peace treaty with Emperor Alexios acknowledged the Byzantines' claim to Antioch, but he never returned to northern Syria and Tancred refused to implement the treaty.

Raymond died of an accident on 28 February 1105. His kinsman William Jordan of Cerdanya assumed the command of the siege of Tripoli. The Banu Ammar qadi Fakhr al-Mulk approached powerful Muslim rulers, such as the Turkoman ruler of Damascus, Toghtekin, for support, but to no avail. On his return, the Tripolitan leaders expelled him, and a Fatimid governor assumed power in the city in 1108. Toghtekin attacked Arqa, but William Jordan defeated him and captured it in March or April 1109. Around the same time, Raymond's son Bertrand came to Syria, accompanied by about 4,000 soldiers, to claim his father's inheritance, including first the parts of Antioch once held by Raymond (from Tancred), then the lands near Tripoli (from William Jordan). Heavily outnumbered by Bertrand's forces, William Jordan sought Tancred's protection, offering his fealty to him. Tancred accepted the offer, prompting Bertrand to seek protection from King Baldwin I, submitting himself to Baldwin's suzerainty.

Joscelin ransomed himself in 1107, and Baldwin II also came to an agreement with Jawali Saqawa, the atabeg (governor) of Mosul, who held him captive. (Note: Baldwin had been Sokman's prisoner, but was first seized by Jikirmish, and then by Jawali.) Baldwin was released for a ransom and a promise to support Jawali against Mawdud, who had expelled Jawali from Mosul. Baldwin went to Antioch to claim Edessa, but Tancred demanded an oath of fealty from him that Baldwin refused to take. Baldwin allied with Jawali and an Armenian ruler, Kogh Vasil. Immediate conflict was avoided with the mediation of church leaders who persuaded Tancred to return Edessa to Baldwin in September 1108. Their reconciliation was short-lived. Baldwin and Joscelin supported Jawali to attack the Seljuk ruler of Aleppo, Ridwan, who turned to Tancred for assistance. Tancred routed Baldwin, Joscelin, and Jawali's united armies. Baldwin took refuge in the fortress of Duluk. Tancred soon attacked it, but Jawali forced him to abandon the siege.

== Arbitration at Tripoli ==
=== Summons ===
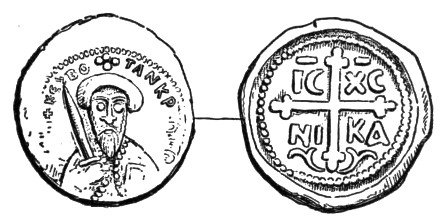
Coin of Tancred, ruler of the Principality of Antioch; his acts prompted King Baldwin I of Jerusalem to summon him to a council in Tripoli.

King Baldwin I eagerly intervened in the northern Frankish leaders' conflicts. In Asbridge's view, Baldwin's worry about Tancred's expansionism prompted his intervention. Kevin J. Lewis, the author of a monograph about the 12th-century history of the County of Tripoli, argues that Baldwin also feared that a prolonged conflict would leave the Franks unprotected against their Muslim neighbors.

In response to Bertrand's appeal, Baldwin appointed two Jerusalemite lords, Pagan of Haifa and Eustace Grenier, to summon the arguing Frankish leaders to "an assembly and council" (as Albert of Aachen mentions). Otherwise an almost unknown aristocrat, Pagan had recently received the Lordship of Haifa in the Jerusalemite kingdom. Eustace had been Baldwin's principal advisor, and would have what the historian Alan V. Murray describes as a "meteoric career". The medievalist Malcolm Barber argues that Eustace "may well have played a key role in preparing the ground, for he appears to have been one of Baldwin's long-term companions".

Baldwin summoned Tancred to the Franks' camp at Tripoli in April 1109. As Tancred was not Baldwin's vassal, the summons was issued in the name of the "church of Jerusalem". The formula reminds the historian Harold S. Fink of the opinion of those who had demanded the transformation of the Holy City into an ecclesiastical lordship. Baldwin called on Tancred and William Jordan to answer for their "injustices", mentioning their usurpation of lands that lawfully belonged to Baldwin II, Joscelin, and Bertrand, thus prejudicing their guilt. Because the cities of Edessa and Turbessel had already been restored to Baldwin II and to Joscelin, respectively, Asbridge assumes that the summons referred to the Lordship of Marash, which was still probably held by Tancred's representative, Richard, in the County of Edessa. The summons outraged William Jordan, who decided to attack Bertrand, but Tancred pacified him. They raised an army of 700 horsemen, allegedly to join the siege of Tripoli, and marched to the besiegers' camp. On the king's summons, Baldwin II and Joscelin also went to Tripoli.

=== Settlement ===
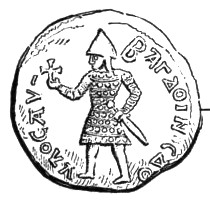
Coin of Baldwin II, Count of Edessa; the council of Tripoli sanctioned his claim to lands that Tancred had seized in his county.

The council opened after all parties arrived. King Baldwin I and his vassals acted as what Asbridge calls "some sort of jury" presided over by Baldwin himself. First, each parties' grievances were listed before the participants. Thereafter, Baldwin I convinced the quarrelling Frankish leaders to reach a compromise, and, with Albert of Aachen's words, everyone was "forgiven and calmed down". According to Albert's account, William Jordan was allowed to keep Arqa and "the other things which he could obtain". Lewis explains these words as a reference to the acknowledgement of William Jordan's claim to retain his conquests and to establish a lordship with Arqa as its center with a plan of expanding it at the expense of the nearby Muslim emirates of Homs, Shayzar, and Damascus. In return for the confirmation of his claims, William Jordan promised that he would not prevent Bertrand from taking possession of the lands that his father had conquered, such as Jubayl. Albert does not mention Tortosa (which had been captured by Bertrand's father), but William of Tyre writes that it was also kept by William Jordan.

Tancred had to restore all lands that he had "unjustly stolen" from Baldwin II and Joscelin, thus they were reconciled. On the other hand, Tancred regained his former Galileen principality—Haifa, Tiberias, and Nazareth—and the Temple of the Lord in the Holy City from King Baldwin I. Asbridge emphasises that nothing proves that Tancred indeed took control of the principality or received revenues from it. He adds that Tancred did not owe fealty to Baldwin I for Antioch, but from then on he could call on Baldwin's support in his conflict with the Byzantines as the holder of a large fief in Baldwin's kingdom.

According to William of Tyre's account, Bertrand and William Jordan became the vassals of Baldwin I and Tancred, respectively, holding their lordships—Bertrand the southern, William Jordan the northern parts of what would soon emerge as the County of Tripoli—in fief. Lewis underscores that this division indicates that the settlement (either consciously or by chance) restored the border dividing the Byzantine Empire and the Fatimid Caliphate on the eve of the mid-11th-century Turkoman invasion, instead of taking into account William Jordan's conquest-based claim or Bertrand's claim to his father's inheritance. William Jordan did not long survive the settlement because he was murdered by an unidentified assassin. (Note: Al-Qalanisi writes that a Frank killed William Jordan who had attacked him for unknown reason. William of Tyre says that rumours accused Bertrand of staging his rival's assassination.)

=== Assessment ===
Asbridge considers the council of Tripoli as a sign of the existence of a "formal confraternity" among the Frankish rulers. He also emphasises that the assembly served as a demonstration of King Baldwin's authority over all crusader states. Fink also regards the day of the settlement as "a great day for Baldwin I", since his suzerainty over Edessa and Bertrand's lordship was sanctioned. In Asbridge's view, the council was "something of disaster for Tancred in terms of his relationship with" the emerging County of Tripoli, especially after his vassal William Jordan died. In contrast, Lewis says that the settlement gave Tancred "control over what had once been ... the southernmost district of the Byzantine doukate" (province) "of Antioch" by sanctioning his suzerainty over William Jordan's lordship. According to him, the "verdict at Tripoli proved fairly balanced, acknowledging that both claimants deserved satisfaction".

Lewis also notes that, until the mid-12th century several documents mention only two crusader states, Jerusalem and Antioch, indicating that observers did not regard Tripoli and Edessa as independent polities. The first document is a decision attributed to Bishop Adhemar of Le Puy, the papal legate to the First Crusade, about the future borders between Antioch and Jerusalem. Preserved in manuscript in the cartulary of the Church of the Holy Sepulchre, the decision sets the limit for the two states "at the river that flows between Tripoli and Tortosa", which Lewis associates with the Arqa River. Lewis identifies the Arqa as the river separating Bertrand's and William Jordan's lordships in accordance with the settlement at Tripoli. The mid-12th-century author known as Pseudo-Fretellus names the same river as the Jerusalemite kingdom's northern border. In 1145, a grant of lands and fortresses by Count Raymond II of Tripoli to the Knights of Hospitaller was confirmed by Queen Melisende and King Baldwin III of Jerusalem, and by Princess Constance and Prince Raymond of Antioch, as suzerains of the possessions situated in the County of Tripoli.

== Aftermath ==
William Jordan's lordship was claimed by Bertrand, but he could only secure his possession of Arqa because Tortosa was captured by Tancred either soon after William Jordan's death or in 1110 or 1111. The crusader states' united armies and their Genoese allies captured Tripoli on 12 July 1109, not long after William Jordan's death. Bertrand soon reasserted his swearing of fealty to King Baldwin, confirming the status of the County of Tripoli as a Jerusalemite fief.

The settlement at Tripoli did not put an end to conflicts between Tancred and Baldwin II. When Mawdud invaded the County of Edessa in 1110, Tancred was reluctant to assist Baldwin II, who accused him of cooperation with Mawdud. Their conflict was soon resolved at what Albert of Aachen calls "a council of magnates", convoked by King Baldwin. At the council, Tancred's claim of suzerainty over Edessa was rejected, and the two Frankish rulers were reconciled.

The relationship between Tripoli and Antioch significantly improved during the reign of Bertrand's son, Pons, who succeeded his father in 1112. He received Tortosa and other fortresses in fief from Tancred and, after Tancred's death, wed his widow Cecile of France. Lewis supposes that the Antiochene and Tripolitan elites' shared aversion to the Jerusalemite king's attempts to intervene in their affairs brought about a reconciliation between the two crusader states.

== Sources ==
- Asbridge, Thomas S. (2000). The Creation of the Principality of Antioch, 1098–1130. The Boydell Press. ISBN 978-0-85115-661-3.
- Barber, Malcolm (2012). The Crusader States. Yale University Press. ISBN 978-0-300-11312-9.
- Christie, Niall (2006). "Ibn al-Qalānisī (d. 1160)". In Murray, Alan V. (ed.). D–J. The Crusades: An Encyclopedia. Vol. II. ABC Clio. pp. 606–80. ISBN 978-1-57607-862-4.
- Duncalf, Frederic (1969). "The First Crusade: Clermont to Constantinople". In Baldwin, Marshall W. (ed.). The First Hundred Years. A History of the Crusades. Vol. One (second ed.). The University of Wisconsin Press. pp. 253–279. ISBN 978-0-299-04834-1.
- Edgington, Susan B. (2006). "Albert of Aachen". In Murray, Alan V. (ed.). A–C. The Crusades: An Encyclopedia. Vol. I. ABC Clio. pp. 25–26. ISBN 978-1-57607-862-4.
- Fink, Harold S. (1969). "The Foundation of the Latin States, 1099–1118". In Baldwin, Marshall W. (ed.). The First Hundred Years. A History of the Crusades. Vol. One (second ed.). The University of Wisconsin Press. pp. 368–409. ISBN 978-0-299-04834-1.
- Jotischky, Andrew (2017) [2004]. Crusading and the Crusader States (Second ed.). Routledge. ISBN 978-1-138-80806-5.
- Köhler, Michael A. (2013). Konrad Hirschler (ed.). Alliances and Treaties between Frankish and Muslim Rulers in the Middle East: Cross-Cultural Diplomacy in the Period of the Crusades. The Muslim World in the Age of the Crusades: Studies and Texts. Translated by Peter M. Holt. BRILL. ISBN 978-90-04-24857-1.
- Lewis, Kevin James (2017). The Counts of Tripoli and Lebanon in the Twelfth Century: Sons of Sant-Gilles. Rulers of the Latin East. Routledge. ISBN 978-1-4724-5890-2.
- Lock, Peter (2006). The Routledge Companion to the Crusades. Routledge Companion to History. Routledge. ISBN 978-0-415-39312-6.
- Murray, Alan V. (2000). The Crusader Kingdom of Jerusalem: A Dynastic History 1099–1125. Prosopographica et Genealogica. Vol. 4. Unit for Prosopographical Research, Linacre College, Oxford. ISBN 978-1-9009-3403-9.
- Stewart, Angus (2006). "Matthew of Edessa". In Murray, Alan V. (ed.). K–Q. The Crusades: An Encyclopedia. Vol. III. ABC Clio. pp. 806–807. ISBN 978-1-57607-862-4.
