= White bear of Henry III =

Bear owned by Henry III of England

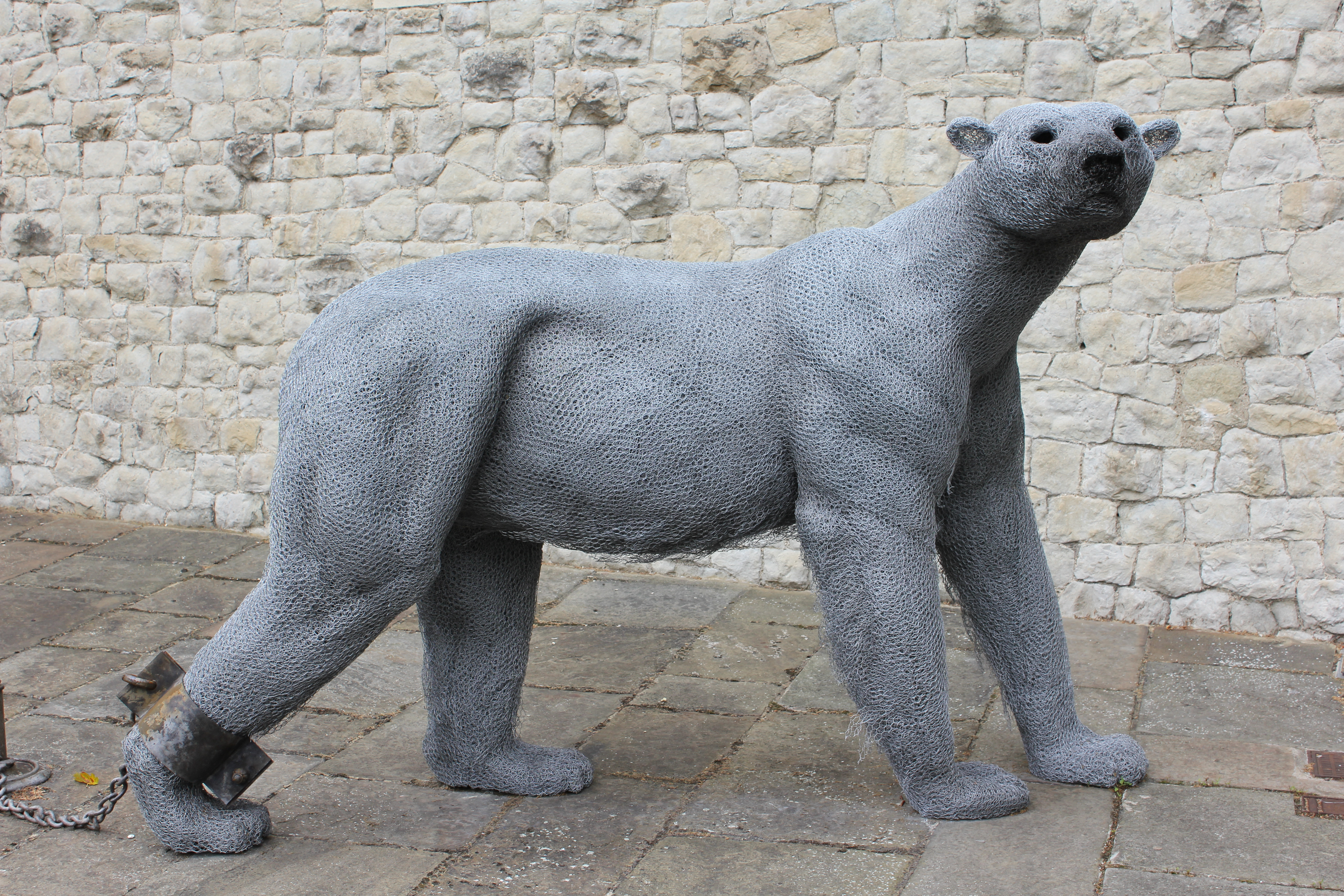
A sculpture by Kendra Haste of the bear in the Tower of London, commissioned in 2010

The white bear of Henry III was given to King Henry III of England by King Haakon IV of Norway in 1252. Its exact identity is not certain, but it was most likely a polar bear. Henry housed the bear at his Royal Menagerie in the Tower of London. It was exercised in the tower grounds and, following an order by the king in 1253, allowed to swim in the River Thames. The bear was a popular attraction and later monarchs kept similar bears.

== Background ==
Although earlier monarchs had kept exotic animals at the Tower of London, Henry III (reigned 1216–1272) established a permanent Royal Menagerie. Its first animals were three "leopards"—though the term was more fluid in the medieval era and probably referred to lions—given to Henry by Holy Roman Emperor Frederick II in 1235 upon his marriage to Henry's sister Isabella. Animals were kept in the menagerie until 1835, when concerns over their welfare led to its closure.

== Gift ==
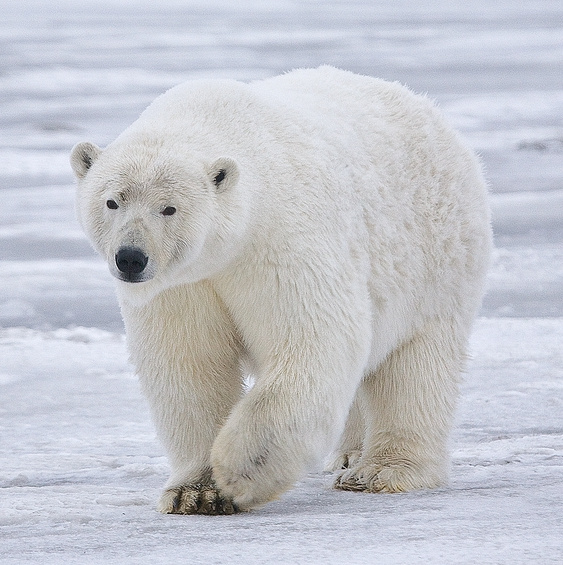
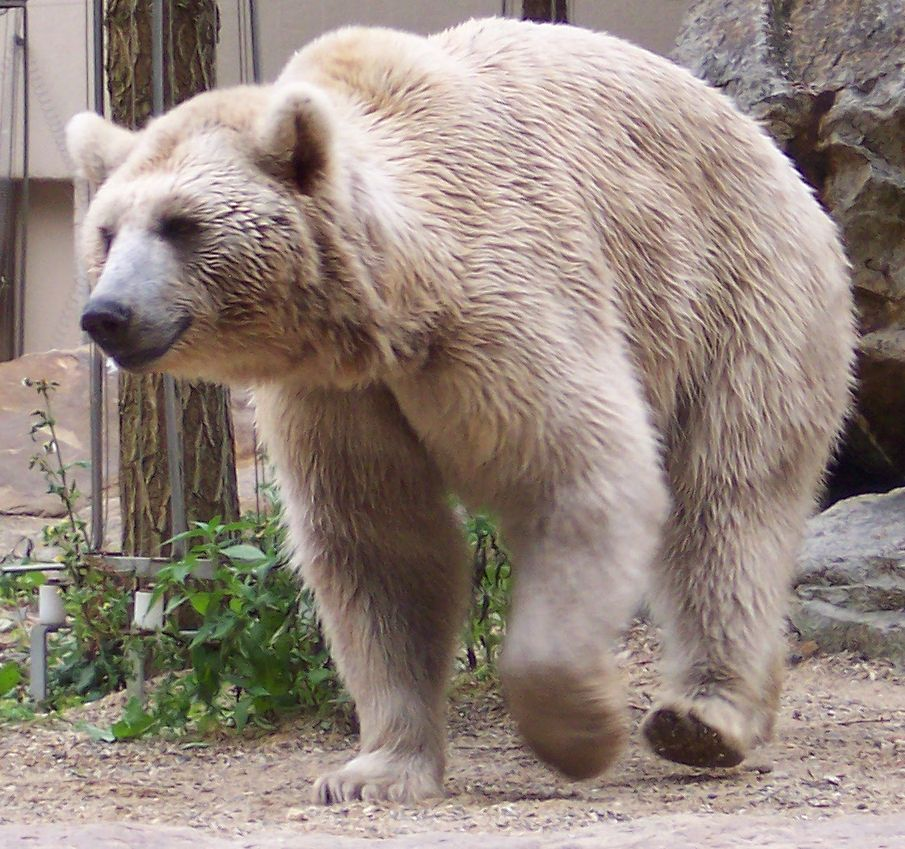
A polar bear (top) and Syrian brown bear (bottom)

A pale or white bear was given to Henry by Haakon IV of Norway in 1252. The species is not known definitively, but it was most likely a polar bear, which were known as white bears in Britain before the 19th century. Alternative explanations, such as unusually coloured specimens of the Eurasian brown bear, would likely not have been considered sufficiently regal a gift. The light-coloured Syrian brown bear is another possibility, but Haakon had around this time also gifted a "white bear" to Frederick II, who reigned in Sicily and would already have had access to Syrian brown bears.

The Norwegian and Baltic populations of polar bears had been exterminated by the 10th century. For a polar bear to have reached Norway, it would either have arrived on drifting ice or been procured by Haakon from Greenland, over whose Norse settlements he was exerting increasing control. The white bear was an important royal symbol in Norse history, similar in status to leopards and lions of the English crown, so the gift had great diplomatic value. It is not known if the bear had an individual name.

== At the Tower ==
The white bear was housed in the menagerie of the Tower of London, and its handler occasionally led it around the grounds for exercise. Henry was shocked by the expense of keeping the bear, so he delegated its upkeep to the sheriffs of London; he made the order on 13 September 1252 at Bury St Edmunds and it was communicated to the sheriffs from Windsor on 29 September. The sheriffs' allowance of four sous a day proved hardly sufficient for the bear. They were also responsible for providing clothing to its Norwegian handler.

Henry was concerned that the bear was insufficiently provided for. On 30 October 1253, he ordered that a muzzle and chain be made so it could be walked outside of the Tower's grounds, and that it be permitted to swim, bathe, and fish in the River Thames tethered by a long rope. The upkeep payments were also increased to six pence per day. The bear would be taken to the Thames daily, where it fished for salmon. The excursions proved popular with the public, who flocked to the river to watch.

== Legacy ==
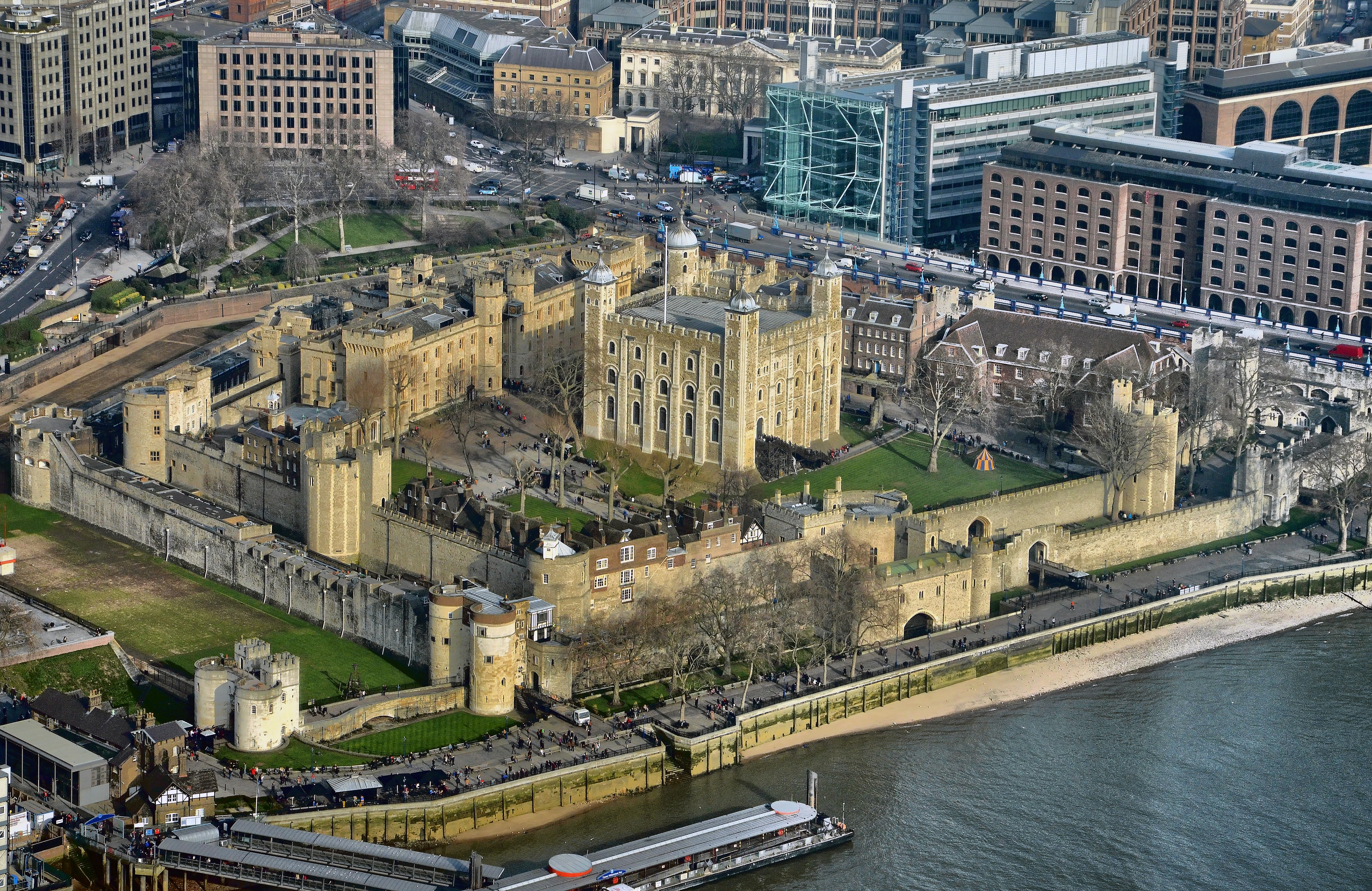
Modern-day view of the Tower of London, with the River Thames in the foreground

The bear was a popular attraction. Its popularity in the menagerie was surpassed only by the arrival of an elephant in 1255, a gift from Louis IX of France. The tower records note payments for the transport of another white bear, named Lynn, in 1287. This bear is presumed to have been shipped from a place of the same name—perhaps Lyngen Fjord—and been caught in Svalbard; it was likely a replacement for Henry's original bear. Another white bear was present at the menagerie by 1549. James VI and I received two polar bear cubs in 1609 and kept them in his bear garden. The white bear, or its replacements, led to a number of public houses adopting the name "the White Bear". The bear may also have inspired the symbol's use on token coins such as those issued by traders in Bride Lane (off Fleet Street) in the 17th century. In 2022, the American author Susan Fletcher published A Bear Far from Home, a children's book presenting a fictional account of the bear's life in London.
