= John of Valenciennes =

John of Valenciennes (fl. 1243–1267) was a baron and diplomat of the kingdom of Jerusalem. He began in the service of the Latin emperor Baldwin II, before joining Louis IX of France on the Seventh Crusade. He was the lord of Haifa by marriage from 1257 until 1265. On behalf of the kingdom of Jerusalem, he led a major fundraising effort in Europe in 1261–1264. He served Louis IX as a diplomat to Mamluk Egypt (1250–1251), England (1264), the Papacy (1266) and Sicily (1267).

== Empire of Constantinople ==
John was born in Europe. He began his career in the empire of Constantinople. In 1243, he lent money to the Emperor Baldwin II, as is known from a letter Baldwin sent to Blanche of Castile. Although prominent in Baldwin's entourage, he was never granted a Greek or imperial title. In June 1247 at the abbey of Salzinnes in Namur, Baldwin, who was the advocatus of Mehaigne (Éghezée), gave a part of the tithe of Mehaigne to John as part of settling a debt. In July at Chambéry, having settled all his outstanding debts, Baldwin received a new loan from John for 3,433 livres.

== Holy Land ==
John subsequently served King Louis IX of France as a royal sergeant during the Seventh Crusade. In 1250 and 1251, he was dispatched on two diplomatic missions to Mamluk Egypt. His goal was to secure the release of prisoners from the crusade and to enforce compliance with the terms of the treaty of 1 May 1250, which had brought the crusade to an end. John of Joinville describes the first negotiations thus:

He demanded that the emirs make amends for the insults and injuries they had inflicted on the king. They said that they would do so willingly so long as the king would ally himself with them against the sultan of Damascus. My lord John of Valenciennes berated them strongly for the great outrages they had committed against the king, which I have already described, and advised them that it would be wise to release all the knights they were holding in prison, so as to soothe the king's heart towards them. This they did, and they also sent all the bones of Count Walter of Brienne for burial in consecrated ground.

John returned from his first embassy in October 1250 with 25 Hospitallers, 15 Templars, 10 Teutonic Knights, 100 other knights and 600 other prisoners. The grand master of the Hospital, Guillaume de Chateauneuf, was among those released at this time. John was dispatched on a return mission after February 1251. He demanded that the sultan cancel the remaining 200,000 livres that Louis owed him. He returned with the gift of an elephant and zebra for Louis as well as 3,000 prisoners in exchange for the release of 300 Egyptian prisoners. He also brought back some children who had been captured and were being raised as Muslims. The remaining ransom was waived.

By 1257, John had become lord of Haifa, probably by marrying the widowed heiress, Helvis, whose sister was married to John of Arsuf. Later records show John as a close ally of John of Arsuf. John's activity as lord of Haifa and one of the most important barons of the kingdom of Jerusalem can be traced in documents until the mid-1260s.

== Europe ==
Following the Mongol raids on Palestine in 1260, John and Archbishop Giles of Tyre were sent to Europe to make Pope Alexander IV aware of the state of Palestine. They arrived shortly after Alexander's death in June 1261. They travelled on to the court of Louis IX before returning to Rome after the election of Pope Urban IV. Their mission was successful in convincing Urban to levy a hundredth for three years for the defence of the Holy Land.

In 1262, John intervened with Pope Urban and King Louis to urge a quick settlement with King Manfred of Sicily. Around the same time, Urban took the collection of the hundredth away from Eudes Rigaud and Eudes de Lorris and entrusted it to John and Giles. The money was deposited with the Templars in Paris and Louis IX controlled disbursements. In 1264, Urban IV decreed a new levy of a hundredth for five years for the Holy Land. In two papal bulls addressed to John, he charged him and Giles with collecting the funds.

In 1264, while John was in Europe, Louis IX sent him to England as a special envoy during the Second Barons' War. His goal was to persuade Simon de Montfort to accept the Mise of Amiens and King Henry III to stop appointing foreigners to important offices. The mission failed.

While John was still in Europe in March 1265, Haifa was conquered by the Mamluks.

In October 1266, when Louis IX decided to embark a new crusade (the Eighth), he sent John and the archdeacon of Paris to inform Pope Clement IV. In 1267, Louis sent John with two others to his the court of his brother, King Charles I of Sicily to persuade him to join the expedition or at least provide money. The envoys arrived in Rome, where Charles was staying, in early May.

== Bibliography ==
- Edbury, Peter W. (1995). "Law and Custom in the Latin East: les letres dou sepulcre". Mediterranean Historical Review. 10 (1–2): 71–79.
- Giebfried, John Joseph (2015). The Imagined Empire of Baldwin II, the Last Crusader Emperor of Constantinople (1217–1273) (PhD diss.). Saint Louis University.
- Hendrickx, Benjamin (1988). "Regestes des empereurs latins de Constantinople (1204–1261/1272)". Byzantina. 14: 7–220.
- Labarge, Margaret Wade (1968). Saint Louis: Louis IX, Most Christian King of France. Brown, Little and Company.
- Marshall, Christopher (1994). Warfare in the Latin East, 1192–1291. Cambridge University Press.
- Mayer, Hans Eberhard (1978). "Ibelin versus Ibelin: The Struggle for the Regency of Jerusalem, 1253–1258". Proceedings of the American Philosophical Society. 122 (1): 25–57.
- Pearson, Jeremy Daniel (2018). The Islamic World and the Latin East: William of Tripoli and His Syrian Context (PhD diss.). University of Tennessee.
- Richard, Jean (1992) [1983]. Saint Louis: Crusader King of France. Translated by Jean Birrell. Cambridge University Press.
- Richard, Jean (1999) [1996]. The Crusades, c.1071–c.1291. Translated by Jean Birrell. Cambridge University Press.
- Runciman, Steven (1954). A History of the Crusades. Vol. 3: The Kingdom of Acre and the Later Crusades. Cambridge University Press.
- Smith, Caroline, ed. (2008). Joinville and Villehardouin: Chronicles of the Crusades. Penguin Books.
