= Pagan I of Haifa =

Pagan of Haifa (Latin: Paganus de Cayphas) was a 12th-century aristocrat in the Kingdom of Jerusalem. Few details of his life are known. He was the lord of Haifa c. 1109.

Latin East c. 1102

Few details of his life are known. The historian Alan V. Murray says that Pagan likely received the Lordship of Haifa in the Kingdom of Jerusalem—a crusader states established in Palestine by western European aristocrats after the First Crusade—from King Baldwin I after Haifa's previous lord, Rorgius, died in 1107. The lordship had been established in 1101 by Baldwin following a debate between two claimants, the Lotharingian crusader Geldemar Carpenel and the Italo-Norman aristocrat Tancred who ruled the Principality of Galilee in Palestine. This year Tancred abandoned Galilee and went to the Principality of Antioch—a crusader state in northern Syria—to assume the regency for his uncle Prince Bohemond I, who had recently been captured by Muslim raiders. As lord of Haifa, Pagan made a grant before 1110 to the Hospital of St. John in the city of Jerusalem. Murray says that a later lord of Haifa, Vivian, may have been related to Pagan, as his son was Pagan's namesake.

Pagan had certainly become a prominent aristocrat by 1109. This year, King Baldwin appointed him and an other influential nobleman, Eustace Grenier, as his envoys to Tancred and Willam Jordan. William Jordan assumed the command of the siege of the city of Tripoli in 1105, after the death of his kinsman Raymond who had begun the siege and first styled himself as count of Tripoli in 1103. Tancred and William Jordan had been accused by King Baldwin's cousin and vassal Count Baldwin II of Edessa and Raymond's son, Bertrand, of usurping the lands they claimed. Pagan and Eustace were sent to Tancred and William Jordan to deliver the king's summons for a council of Tripoli to them. The council ended with a compromise between the parties. The reconciliation paved the way for their concentrated attack on Tripoli which fell to them on 12 July.

== Sources ==
- Barber, Malcolm (2012). The Crusader States. Yale University Press. ISBN 978-0-300-11312-9.
- Murray, Alan V. (2000). The Crusader Kingdom of Jerusalem: A Dynastic History 1099–1125. Prosopographica et Genealogica. Vol. 4. Unit for Prosopographical Research, Linacre College, Oxford. ISBN 978-1-9009-3403-9.
- Runciman, Steven (1988) [1951]. The Kingdom of Jerusalem and the Frankish East 1100–1187. A History of the Crusades. Vol. II. Cambridge University Press. ISBN 978-0-521-06162-9.
- Tibble, Steven (1989). Monarchy and Lordships in the Latin Kingdom of Jerusalem 1099–1291. Clarendon Press. ISBN 978-0-19-822731-1.

Preceded by Rorgius	Lord of Haifa; 1107/9–?	Succeeded by Vivian
