= Elephant of Henry III =

Elephant (c. 1245–1257)

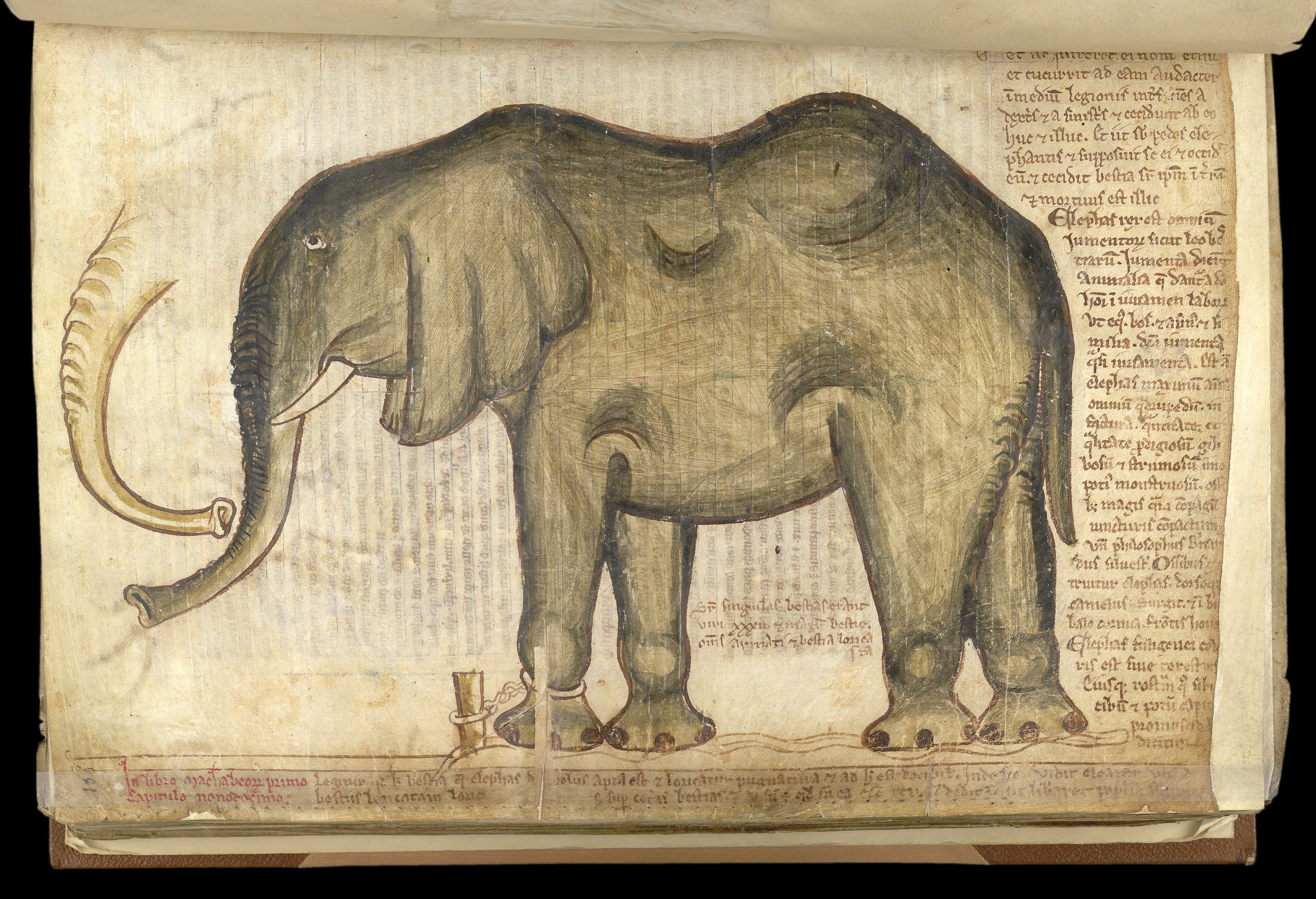
- Drawing by Matthew Paris in Liber Additamentorum
- Species: Elephant
- Born: c. 1245; Ayyubid Egypt
- Died: 14 February 1257 (aged 11–12); Tower of London, England
- Known for: First elephant in England since the Roman conquest of Britain
- Owner: Henry III of England

The elephant of Henry III (c. 1245 – 14 February 1257) was an animal of the king's Royal Menagerie at the Tower of London. The elephant is thought to be one given by Egypt to Louis IX of France as a diplomatic gift during the Seventh Crusade. The animal was given to Henry III as he was travelling through France in late 1254. It was kept for a while at Wissant on the northern French coast, whilst transport was arranged to England.

The elephant arrived in England in early 1255 and a special house for it was constructed at the Lion's Tower of the Tower of London. It was the first elephant to be seen in the country since the Roman invasion of 43 AD. The animal attracted crowds of onlookers including the chronicler Matthew Paris who produced two drawings of it. The elephant survived in the Tower until 14 February 1257. It was buried in the Tower's bailey, but exhumed for unknown reasons by Henry in 1258.

== Background and gifting ==
Although earlier monarchs had kept exotic animals at the Tower of London it was Henry III that established the Royal Menagerie on a permanent footing, with animals being kept continuously from 1235 until 1834. Henry had received three "leopards" (which were, more probably, three lions) from Holy Roman Emperor Frederick II in 1235, upon his marriage to Henry's sister Isabella of England. He later received a "white bear", presumed to be a polar bear, from Haakon IV of Norway.

The elephant seems to have arrived in Europe as a result of Louis IX of France's Seventh Crusade, which began in 1248 with an expedition to Egypt. This failed and Louis was captured and ransomed. He chose to remain in the region to continue the crusade, attempting to defend the crusader states in the Holy Land. Egypt proposed an alliance with Louis against Syria and gave him an elephant to this end in 1252–1253. The elephant was brought from Cairo to Acre, along with many freed prisoners, by John of Valenciennes. Louis sent the animal back to France and returned there himself in July 1254.

In November and December 1254 Henry III, travelling through France on his return from Gascony to England, met Louis at Orleans and Paris. During their meetings Henry demanded the return of the French provinces lost by his father, John, though the meetings were generally amicable and the men were brothers-in-law, Henry's wife Eleanor being a sister of Louis' wife Margaret. Louis is thought to have given the elephant to Henry around the time of these meetings.

The elephant first appears in English records of 13 December 1254 when Henry, who was then travelling from Paris to England, appointed his clerk, Peter of Gannoc, as the animal's keeper. Peter was dispatched to meet the keeper of the Royal Menagerie, John Gouche, to arrange the transport of the elephant to England.

In February 1255 Henry, by then at the Palace of Westminster, ordered the Sheriff of Kent to assist the keepers. The sheriff went to Dover with Gouche and arranged transport for the elephant, which was then being kept at Wissant, near Calais. The Exchequer reimbursed the sheriff £6 17s 5d for the transport of the elephant, which was unloaded at Sandwich Quay in a 40ft x 20ft crate, with additional funds for the transport of Henry's treasure and messengers from Louis, coming to £9 6d total.

== Arrival at the Tower ==
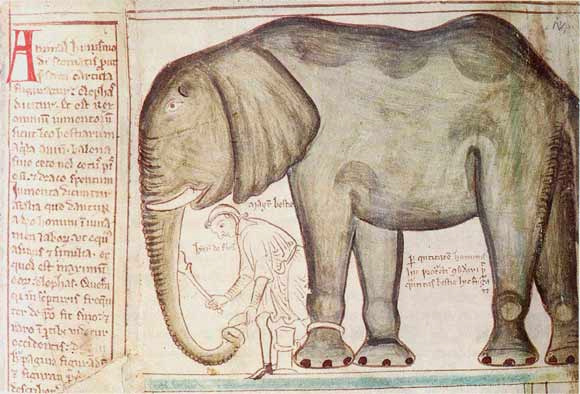
The second drawing made by Paris, in Chronica Majora

The elephant was brought to London and handed to the sheriffs of that city. They were ordered to construct a house for the animal within the Lion's Tower of the Tower of London, home to the Royal Menagerie. A 40 by 20 feet (12.2 m × 6.1 m) wooden structure was built, which was adaptable for other uses. The sheriffs claimed £22 20d in expenses for the project.

The animal was the first elephant in England since those brought by Claudius in 43 AD for the Roman conquest of Britain and its arrival caused a sensation. Chronicler Matthew Paris recorded the event in his Chronica Majora and noted that "people flocked together to see the novel sight". Paris travelled from St Albans Abbey to view the elephant for himself. He noted that it was "a beast most strange and wonderful to the English people". He states its age as ten years, noted that it was "ponderous and robust" and measured 10 feet (3.0 m) in height.

Paris is known to have drawn the animal from life, an unusual practice at a time when depictions of animals were based primarily on convention or by copying from bestiaries. It is believed that his first drawing was the one contained in his Liber Additamentorum (Book of Additional Things). It depicts the animal in colour and with a separate study of a different positioning of the trunk. The second drawing appears in Chronica Majora and is less detailed. It may have been based on the first drawing or from sketches, no longer extant, made during Paris' visit. The second drawing shows a more realistic trunk and depicts the animal's keeper, Henry de Flor, to provide an indication of scale. Paris' drawings show prominent knee joints. This is contrary to the prevailing belief, introduced by the 4th-century AD Hexameron of Ambrose, that the animals had no knees and could not rise from the ground if they fell.

== Exhibition and death ==
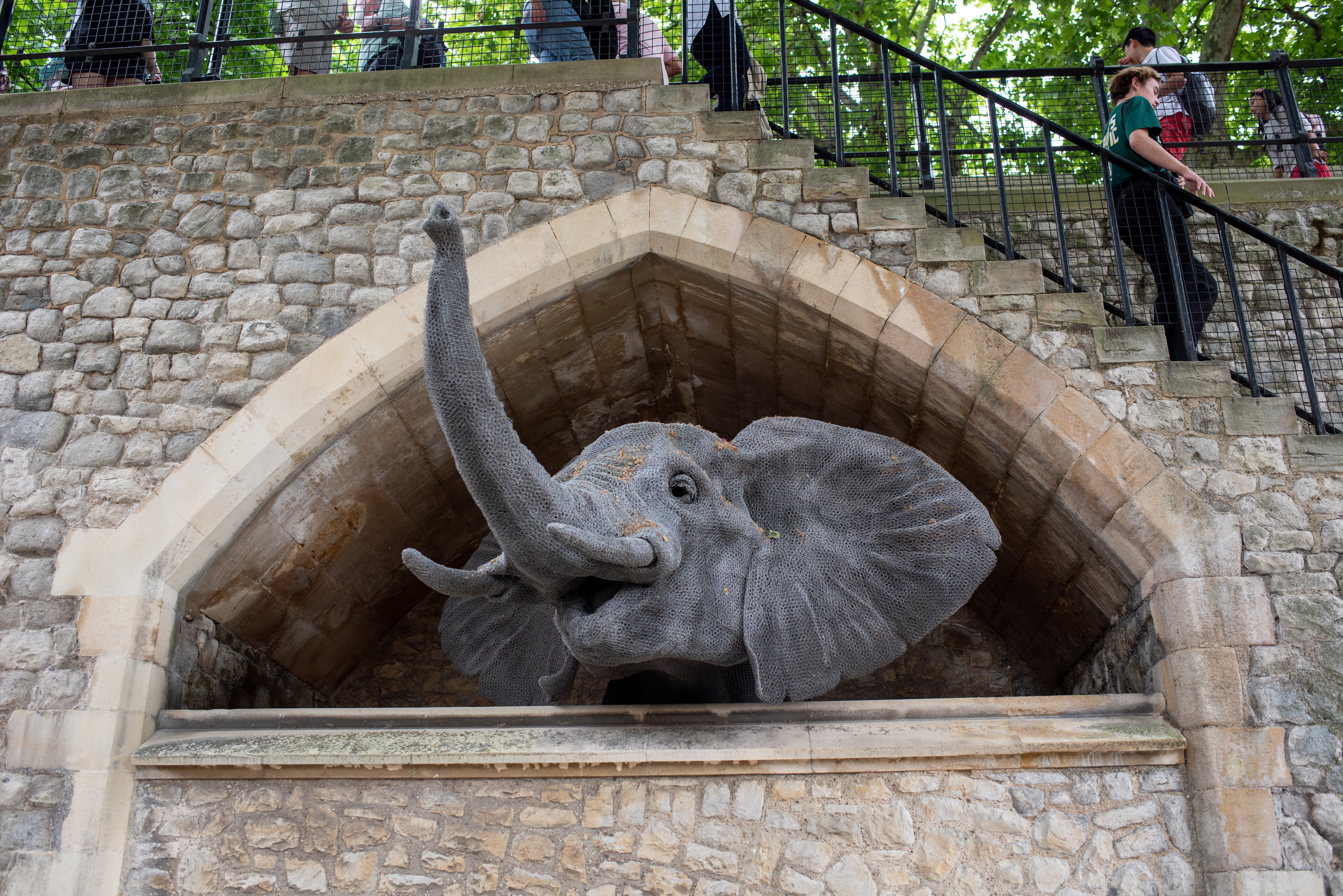
A modern sculpture depicting the keeping of elephants at the Tower of London

De Flor had apparently succeeded Gouche to the role of keeper of the king's elephant when the latter left Henry's service in May 1255, apparently on good terms. In late 1255 the new sheriffs of London (it was an annual office) were ordered by the king to provide for the maintenance of the elephant and its keeper. From December 1255 to September 1256 the costs were £24 14s 3.5d. At this time a labourer made around 2d a day and £15 was considered sufficient to support a knight for a year The order was renewed for the following term and the sheriffs claimed £16 13s 1d from September 1256 to 14 February 1257, when the elephant died. The animal had been a source of great pride for Henry.

In August 1258 Henry ordered the Constable of the Tower to exhume the elephant's bones from the bailey of the Tower of London and provide them to the sacristan of Westminster Abbey to do what the king had instructed with them (this order has not been found). It is not known if the king was intent on recovering the valuable ivory from the animal, planned to exhibit the bones as a curiosity or intended to reinter them. It is possible Henry's order was intended to provide a respectable resting place for the animal at the Abbey, which he had established as the burial place of future kings. Mediaeval bestiaries attributed faithful and gentle virtues to elephants and associated them with the Biblical paradise and the redemption of Christ. Later monarchs kept other elephants at the tower. The elephant house survived until its abandonment and demolition in the mid 19th century.
