= Lordship of Haifa =

The Lordship of Haifa (Latin: Cayphas) was a feudal seigneury formed by the Franks in the Kingdom of Jerusalem, centered on the town of Haifa (in modern-day Israel).

== Establishment ==
Before it was even captured by the Frankish crusaders, Haifa was promised by Godfrey of Bouillon to Prince Tancred of Galilee. Godfrey changed his mind, however, and instead promised the town to Geldemar Carpenel. King Baldwin I upheld Godfrey's decision. Historian Steven Tibble believes that the king wished to deny an outlet to the sea to the powerful Principality of Galilee. Haifa was conquered by Baldwin and a Venetian fleet after a month-long siege in July-August 1100. According to Albert of Aachen, its Muslim garrison and its inhabitants, most of whom were Jews, were massacred.

After the Frankish conquest, a small lordship of Haifa developed. It encompassed the Mount Carmel region between the larger holdings centered at Acre and Caesarea Maritima. It was initially depended on the Principality of Galilee. A large castle, called New Haifa, had been built by 1175, and Old Haifa was abanonded. Close to the new castle was a large palm grove.

== Lords ==
After Geldemar Carpenel left Haifa, King Baldwin I granted the lordship to Pagan I. Pagan's dynasty ruled until the second half of the 13th century. The lords owed 10 knights to the royal army and enjoyed privileges of barons such as the right to dispense justice and use a seal. The lord's seal featured a symbol of his castle. Yet, like the lordships of Blanchegarde and Scandaleon, Haifa held the status of only a rear-fief to the royal domain at Acre. The lords of Haifa ranked relatively high among the Franks, but had a limited role in the affairs of state and were content to administer their own lordship. They were supporters of Emperor Frederick II in his struggles against the other nobles after the Sixth Crusade, and one scion, Reynald of Haifa, was appointed to govern Jerusalem.

== Revenues ==
The Arab geographer al-Idrisi, who wrote in the mid-12th century, described the harbor of Haifa as the principal seaport of the Principality of Galilee and the main source of revenues for the lords of Haifa. Although the port was smaller than that of Acre, it attracted merchants, and in 1244 the Genoese received trade privileges. The lordship was highly dependent on its fiefs in other lordships of the kingdom. Pagan II, for example, held extensive lands in the Principality of Galilee. Although Pagan exchanged these for a money fief in 1168, the lords of Haifa retained significant lands in the Principality of Galilee up to the later half of the 13th century. From at least 1168 onwards the lords of Haifa owned substantial money fiefs in the royal domain at Acre. In July 1187, after the Battle of Hattin, Haifa was abandoned to the Egyptian ruler Saladin. The Franks retook it in August 1191, but only after Saladin had its defences reduced. Haifa was then restored to its former lords. The fortifications were only reconstructed in 1250 by King Louis IX of France.

In 1229 Emperor Frederick attempted to revoke several fiefs in Acre, including that of the lord of Haifa, Rohard, but they successfully appealed to the High Court. Documentary evidence suggests that the lords of Haifa also owned property in the Lordship of Toron: in 1236, Geoffrey, lord of Haifa, was listed among the men of the lady of Toron, Alice of Armenia. Because of the lord's reliance on the fiefs outside of his lordship, the historian Steven Tibble concludes that the lord of Haifa could not take political action against the king without the active support of other lords.

In 1250, the lord of Haifa was García Álvarez, ruling in right of his wife, Helvis. By 1257, Haifa had passed to John of Valenciennes, probably the next husband of Helvis. Haifa was captured by the Muslim army of the Egyptian ruler Baibars in March 1265, and its walls were destroyed. The Franks soon took it once again. In 1291 it was permanently lost by the Franks to the Egyptian Mamluks, after which it was abandoned. No trace of medieval Haifa survives.

== Bibliography ==
- Mayer, Hans Eberhard (1978). "Ibelin versus Ibelin: The Struggle for the Regency of Jerusalem, 1253–1258". Proceedings of the American Philosophical Society. 122 (1): 25–57. JSTOR 986261.
- Murray, Alan V. (2006). The Crusades: An Encyclopedia. Bloomsbury Academic. ISBN 978-1-57607-863-1.
- Pringle, D. (1993). The Churches of the Crusader Kingdom of Jerusalem: A Corpus: Volume 1, A–K (excluding Acre and Jerusalem). Cambridge University Press. ISBN 978-0-521-39036-1.
- Tibble, S. (1989). Monarchy and Lordships in the Latin Kingdom of Jerusalem, 1099–1291. Clarendon Press. ISBN 978-0-19-822731-1.
