= Arqa River =

River in Lebanon

Location
- Country: Lebanon

Physical characteristics
- Mouth
  - location: Mediterranean Sea
  - coordinates: 34°33′03″N 35°59′26″E
- Length: 25 km (16 mi)

The Arqa River (Arabic: نهر عرقا, romanized: Nahr ʿArqā) is a river in the northern part of Lebanon. It originates from the barren lands of Akkar, passing through a number of towns in the Akkar district before reaching the Mediterranean. Its basin area covers approximately 143 km². It is a seasonal river with run-off lasting only a few months per year.

The river encompasses 23 major villages and towns, including Akkar El-Atika, Tekrit, and Rahbeh.
