= Cyprus in the Middle Ages =

The Medieval history of Cyprus starts with the division of the Roman Empire into an eastern and western half.

== Byzantine period ==
Upon the division of the Roman Empire into eastern and western halves, Cyprus fell under Eastern Roman administration. The cities of Cyprus were destroyed by two successive earthquakes in 332 and 342. This marked the beginning of a new era, very much connected with modern life in Cyprus. Most of the cities were not rebuilt, save Salamis which was rebuilt on a smaller scale and renamed Constantia after the Roman emperor Constantius II. The new city was now the capital of the island. It was mainly Christian and due to this, some alterations were made during the rebuilding. The palaestra was turned into a meeting place and many architectural elements was used to erect spacious churches decorated with murals, mosaics, and coloured marble.

At this time, Cyprus's bishop, was made autocephalous by the First Council of Ephesus. People were engaged in matters of faith, especially in fighting the effort of the Eastern Orthodox Patriarch of Antioch to put the Church of Cyprus under his control. They were finally successful in 488, when Archbishop Anthemius, guided by a dream, discovered the tomb of Barnabas with the saint's body lying in a coffin and on his chest a copy of the Gospel of Matthew in Barnabas's own writing. Having the relics with him, Anthemius went to Constantinople and presented them to Emperor Zeno. The latter was impressed and not only confirmed the independence of the Church of Cyprus but also gave to the Archbishop in perpetuity three privileges that continue today; the privilege to carry a sceptre instead of a pastoral staff, to sign with red ink and to wear a purple cloak during services. By the beginning of the 7th century, the patriarch of Alexandria was John the Merciful from Amathus. Another important Cypriot of the time is the church writer Leontios of Neapolis.

== Arab conquest ==
In 649 the Arabs made their first attack on the island, under the leadership of Mu'awiya I. They conquered the capital Constantia after a brief siege, and drafted a treaty with the local rulers. In the course of this expedition a relative of Muhammad, Umm-Haram, fell from her mule near the salt lake at Larnaca and was killed. She was buried at that spot and the Hala Sultan Tekke was built there in Ottoman times. The Arabs returned in 650, under Abu al-A'war, and installed a garrison of 12,000 on part of the island, where they remained until 680.

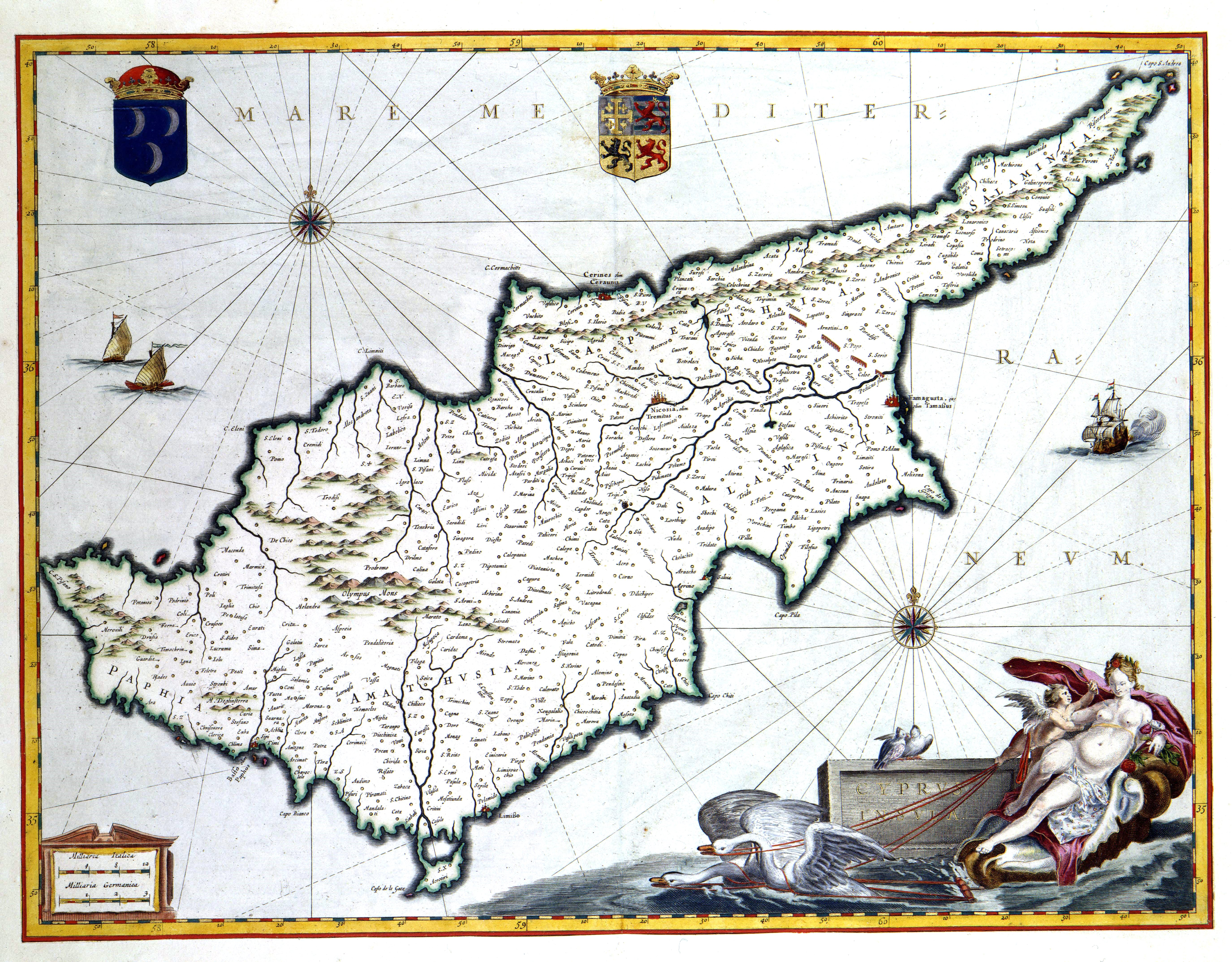
The middle age depiction of Cyprus, where 'Ubadah ibn al-Samit under Mu'awiya conquered

After Uthman became caliph, Mu'awiya requested that he allow him to build a navy to attack Cyprus, as Mu'awiya reasoned that Cyprus had become a satellite island of Byzantine forces which could threaten the caliphate on the western banks of Palestine. Ubadah ibn al-Samit, along with veteran companions of Muhammad such as Miqdad Ibn al-Aswad, Abu Dharr al-Ghifari, Shaddad ibn Aws, Khalid bin Zayd al-Ansari, and Abu Ayyub al-Ansari, all participated in building the caliphate's first naval armada, led by Mu'awiya. Before he joined Mu'awiya's project to build first naval forces of the caliphate, Ubadah joined forces with Muslim general, Abd Allah ibn Qays. Together with Mu'awiya, they built the first caliphate armada with permission from ibn al-Affan. Abu Dharr mentioned that Miqdad ibn Amr al-Aswad participated in this project. Shortly after, Mu'awiya and Ubadah departed from Acre and headed to Cyprus. According to al-Baladhuri and Khalifa ibn Khayyat, Mu'awiya and Ubadah led the attack and were accompanied by their wives Katwa bint Qaraza ibn Abd Amr of the Qurayshite Banu Nawfal and Umm Haram. Umm Haram died in an accident during the campaign. The Muslim forces accepted Cyprus's surrender under the condition that they refrain from hostility to the Muslims, inform the caliphate of any Byzantine movements, pay 7,200 dinars annually for jizya, and never reveal information to outsiders regarding the caliphate's military operations.

Mu'awiya and Ubadah's forces pacified almost every Byzantine garrison. This is evidenced by two Greek inscriptions in the Cypriot village of Solois which note the two offensives. All of Cyprus surrendered after their capital, Salamis, was surrounded and besieged. At least 50 military operations occurred in Cyprus between this first campaign in 648 until the last one in 650.

In 688, the emperor Justinian II and the caliph Abd al-Malik reached an unprecedented agreement. The Arabs evacuated the island, and for the next 300 years, Cyprus was ruled jointly by both the Caliphate and the Byzantines as a condominium, despite the nearly constant warfare between the two parties on the mainland. The collected taxes were divided between the Arabs and the emperor.

Under Emperor Basil I (r. 867–886) Byzantine troops recaptured Cyprus, which was established as a theme, but after seven years the island reverted to the previous status quo. In 911, the Cypriots helped a Byzantine fleet under admiral Himerios, and in retaliation the Arabs, under Damian of Tarsus ravaged the island for four months and carried off many captives. The isolation of Cyprus from the rest of the Greek-speaking world assisted the formation of a separate Cypriot dialect. This period of Arab influence lasted until the 10th century.

== Byzantine reconquest ==
In 965 or slightly earlier, the Byzantines reconquered the island and set up a theme. The general Niketas Chalkoutzes led the reconquest, of which no details are known, and was probably the first governor of Cyprus after that.

A rebellion by governor Theophilos Erotikos in 1042, and another in 1091 by Rhapsomates, failed as they were quickly subdued by imperial forces.

In 1185, the last Byzantine governor of Cyprus, Isaac Komnenos, from a minor line of the Komnenos imperial house, rose in rebellion and attempted to seize the throne. His attempted coup was unsuccessful, but Komnenos was able to retain control of the island. Byzantine actions against Komnenos failed as he had the support of William II of Sicily. The emperor had agreed with the Sultan of Egypt to close Cypriot harbours to the Crusaders.

== Crusades–Lusignan period 1095–1489 ==
Cyprus was spared the destruction of the loss of Anatolia and remained peaceful and relatively prosperous during turn of the 12th century. During the Siege of Antioch, a battle of the First Crusade, the Crusader army received supplies from Byzantine-controlled Cyprus.

In the spring of 1156, the island was attacked by Raynald of Châtillon and Thoros II. The island was then governed by John Doukas Komnenos, who remained with part of the local garrison at Nicosia, while the general Michael Branas led a force to confront the invaders. Branas was driven back towards Nicosia, and John led a sally to rescue him. The Byzantines were again defeated, with both John and Branas taken prisoner. The victorious Franks and Crusaders then conducted widespread plundering of the island, not sparing churches or convents. In the words of the historian Steven Runciman, "The crops were burnt; the herds were rounded up, together with all the population, and driven down to the coast. The women were raped; children and folk too old to move had their throats cut". The plundering went on for three weeks, before Raynald and Thoros boarded their ships with their loot and prisoners, and departed. The destruction was compounded by the effects of the 1157 Hama earthquake, and by a Fatimid naval raid in 1158.

Richard the Lionheart landed in Limassol on 1 June 1191 in search of his sister and his bride Berengaria, whose ship had become separated from the fleet in a storm. Upon her arrival, the ruler, Isaac Komnenos of Cyprus requested that Berengaria deboard, which she refused, and upon her refusal was denied supplies from Komnenos. Richard took this as an insult and attacked the island which was easily subdued. Komnenos was bound to lend aid to Richard in his crusade against Saladin, an oath which he later broke, and Richard had him bound in silver chains (as he swore not to bind Komnenos in iron) and kept prisoner until his death in 1194 or 1195. The Cypriot chronicler Neophytus gave Richard the epithet of "the wretch". The crusader fleet continued to Acre on 5 June.

Richard's army continued to occupy Cyprus and raised taxes. After local revolts, Richard sold the island to the Knights Templar, who were unable to hold the island because of further hostility among the local population due to tax raising. A rebellion on 6 April, 1192 made the Templars sell the island to Guy of Lusignan (1192–1194) who established himself in May 1192.

=== Guy of Lusignan ===
Guy of Lusignan bought Cyprus in 1192 after he was ousted as the King of Jerusalem. The crusaders described him as "simplex et minus astutus", though he did set the foundation of Cypriot society in the Lusignan period. He invited Palestinian barons, disenfranchised by Saladin, to move to the island, granting them feudal rights over huge estates, using the Cypriots as serfs.

=== Aimery ===
Aimery (1194–1205) became king as Geoffrey of Lusignan passed up on succeeding Guy. During his reign, the Latin church took over the dioceses of the Orthodox, creating a long-standing dispute that also characterized the Lusignan period. Aimery had Cyprus recognized as "kingdom", by the Holy Roman Emperor Henry VI. He then officially regained the title of King of Jerusalem by marrying Henry II of Champagne's widow, Isabel. Though in name only, this title was something the Lusignan kings were very proud of as it appears on the Cypriot coat of arms. After some skirmishing in Acre with the Sultan of Egypt Al-Adil I, a treaty was granted in 1204 giving him some advantages in Palestine. Aimery died in 1205, it is said from eating too much fish in one sitting. He was succeeded by his son Hugh I.

=== Hugh I ===
Hugh I (1205–1218) married Alice of Champagne in 1210 in accordance to an agreement between Hugh VIII of Lusignan and John Doukas Komnenos in a marriage negotiated by Maria Komnene. The marriage produced one son and two daughters.

Hugh I participated in the failed Fifth Crusade, and died suddenly in Tripoli in 1218. He was succeeded by his eight-month-old son Henry I.

=== Henry I ===
Henry I's official regency was undertaken by his mother Alice, but the acting regent was his uncle Philip of Ibelin, who had Henry crowned at the age of 8, to ward off advances of Frederick II, Holy Roman Emperor. When Philip died, the regency passed to Philip's brother John, Old Lord of Beirut, who maintained it until Henry came of age at 15.

When Henry was 12, Emperor Frederick seized the regency, taking it by force from John. However, when Frederick left Cyprus, the popular John rallied forces from the Outremer, and retook the island, which began the War of the Lombards. In the Battle of Agridi, the much smaller force of Ibelins won a surprising victory over the imperial forces, and the efforts of Frederick, proved unsuccessful. King Henry played no part in these struggles, but when of age he participated in the Seventh Crusade under Louis IX of France to destroy the power of Egypt. His forces left behind were forced to surrender in 1250.

Around that time, a young Cypriot who would become Patriarch of Constantinople Gregory II, traveled to the Empire of Nicaea in search of a better education. Gregory's autobiography gives valuable information on the transition from Byzantine to Lusignan rule and its impact on the local population and especially education.

Henry took Plaisance of Antioch as his third wife in 1250, who bore him a son, Hugh II (1253–1267), who came upon the throne while only a few months of age when his father died in 1253.

=== Hugh II ===
Hugh II's mother Plaisance, acted as his regent, and is described by one chronicler as "one of the most valiant women in the world". She appeared at Acre, now erupting into virtual war between the Venetians, Pisans, and Knights Templar and the Genoese, Spanish, and the Hospitallers. By backing the Venetians, she hoped to have Hugh II recognized as the King of Jerusalem, but the title had little value.

When Plaisance died, Hugh of Antioch became regent. When Hugh II died in 1267, Hugh of Antioch became King of Cyprus as Hugh III (1267–1284).

=== Hugh III, John I and Henry II ===
During Hugh III's reign, the Christian-friendly Mongols were pushing from the east and offered a chance of alliance against the Egyptian Sultan, but the eternally feuding powers of Medieval Europe threw this chance away, while Hugh tried to mediate with them in Syria. He died in Tyre, succeeded by his oldest son John I (1284–1285), and then by his other son Henry II (1285–1324). His reign and reputation suffered from his epilepsy, and in 1286 he was crowned at Tyre as King of Jerusalem only to see it fall to Egyptian Mamluk sultan. In 1306, Henry's brother Amaury seized power and exiled Henry in Cilicia, but Henry was restored in 1310. He is mentioned in Dante's Paradiso. Henry II died in 1324 and was succeeded by his nephew Hugh IV (1324–1358).

=== Hugh IV ===
Hugh IV enjoyed a peaceful reign, and preferred to stay on the island. The fall of the last coastal strongholds of the Kingdom of Jerusalem made it unnecessary for Cyprus to spend its money on its defense. It also made the island the center for Oriental trade, and Famagustan merchants became notoriously rich, and the island as a whole became known for its wealth. Hugh IV abdicated in 1358 in favour of his son Peter I (1358–1369).

=== Peter I ===
Peter I is mentioned in Geoffrey Chaucer's The Canterbury Tales. He led an expedition to Alexandria that upset the Italian merchants, but proved successful (at least in gathering booty). He toured Europe to gather support for crusading, but found their promises unfulfilled. He sacked Alexandria again regardless, and in destroying the gates found it impossible to hold against the Mamluks and was driven out. He was murdered by his nobles in 1369. His widow, Eleanor of Aragon, pursued his killers with the help of the Italians. He was succeeded by his son Peter II (1369–1382).

=== Peter II ===
Upon the ascension of Peter II, a riot broke out at the coronation ceremony at the Cathedral of St. Nicholas in Famagusta between the Venetians and the Genoese. The dispute arose over who would lead the king's horse on the right side; traditionally it belonged to the Genoese but now the Venetians took it. Many Genoese were killed in the riot, and the Italian city responded harshly. In 1374, the island surrendered to the Genoese under terms of tribute, payment for damages, and loss of Famagusta to the Genoese, effectively ending the prosperity of Cyprus. Peter II died in 1382 and was succeeded by his uncle James I (1382–1398).

=== James I ===
At the time of his ascension James I was a prisoner in Genoa. He was released on harsh terms, including the provision that all ships coming into Cyprus land in the now Genoese Famagusta. He also had to raise taxes to pay for his release. He added the title King of Armenia in 1393, though it was also titular. He died in 1398 and was succeeded by Peter II's son Janus (1398–1432).

=== Janus ===
Janus unsuccessfully tried to drive the Genoese from Famagusta. In 1426 the Mamluks raided the island, and Janus met them at Khirokitia. Apparently the troops had no water, so they drank wine instead and became intoxicated. When a Mamluk embassy was sent, they were killed by Janus's men. The outraged Mamluks killed Janus's inebriated soldiers. They then proceeded to expose the hoax of the levitating cross at Stavrovouni Monastery, containing a piece deposited by Staint Helena in the 4th century. Janus was taken to Egypt and paraded around backwards on a donkey in humiliation. At the same time according to the chronicle of Leontios Machairas, Cypriot serfs rebelled against the Franks and established "Re Alexis" as a king in Lefkonoiko (the word Re means king in Provençal and Italian), and "captains" in Morphou, Limassol, Lefka and Peristerona. It took the Frankish nobility more than 6 months to defeat the rebels with Re Alexis eventually hanged. Ten months after the battle at Khirokitia, Janus was ransomed back, and Cyprus was now ruled by the Mamluks as a tributary state. Janus died in 1432 and was succeeded by his son John II (1432–1458).

=== John II and James ===
John II was described as "effeminate, but not unattractive" and was reviled by Pope Pius II as a vile evil sloth. He was dominated by two women in his life, both Greek; Helena Palaiologina his wife and Marietta de Patras, his mistress. Supposedly in a fight between the two in the King's presence, Helena off her adversary's nose. As Helenawas Greek, she was well loved by the Cypriots and the orthodox church.

Helena's daughter Charlotte and Marietta's son James would play huge roles in the collapse of the Lusignan dynasty. James "the bastard", as he was called, was well loved by John, who made him archbishop of the island at a very young age. Yet Charlotte in 1458 was recognized as Queen regent, and James fled to Egypt. The two were said to have had a fairly good relationship, and it is probably very much due to the church that this political conflict arose between them. James convinced the Egyptian Sultan to aid him, promising loyalty to Egypt, and landed, armed, in 1460.

James won victories over the major forts, including Genoese Famagusta, and was solidly placed on the throne in 1464. Charlotte had unsuccessfully tried to secure aid from outside, including from the Pope. According to legend, James fell in love with his wife Catherine Cornaro while walking with her uncle who purposely dropped an image of her. The two were wed by proxy, and Catherine was adopted by the Venetian state, securing the passage of Cyprus to the signory. James died in 1473, and his short-lived son the next year, and the Venetians were eyed with suspicion. In 1473, the Catalans on the island started a revolt supporting Ferdinand II of Aragon, that was put down by the Venetians. In 1479, the party of Queen Charlotte plotted to assassinate the queen, but it was betrayed and quashed. Due also to the looming threat of the Ottoman Turks, Venice used the Queen's brother to convince her to abdicate in 1489, ushering in the Venetian period.

== See also ==
- Chronicle of Amadi
- History of Cyprus
- Kingdom of Cyprus
- Ottoman Cyprus

== Sources ==
- Hunt, Sir David (ed.) 1994. Footprints in Cyprus. London.
- Cobham, C. D. 1908 (reprint 1969). Excerpta Cypria. Materials for a History of Cyprus. Cambridge.
- History of Cyprus - Middle Ages by Cypriot Government Archived 1 December 2005 at the Wayback Machine
- Jenkins, Romilly James Heald (1953). "Cyprus between Byzantium and Islam, A.D. 688-965". Studies presented to D.M. Robinson 11. Washington University in St. Louis. pp. 1006–1014.
- Lynch, Ryan J. (July–September 2016). "Cyprus and Its Legal and Historiographical Significance in Early Islamic History". Journal of the American Oriental Society. 136 (3): 535–550. doi:10.7817/jameroriesoci.136.3.0535. JSTOR 10.7817/jameroriesoci.136.3.0535.
- Metcalf, David Michael (2009). Byzantine Cyprus, 491–1191. Cyprus Research Centre.
- Runciman, Steven (1952). A History of the Crusades, Volume II: The Kingdom of Jerusalem and the Frankish East. Vol. 2. Cambridge: Cambridge University Press.
