= Marco Cornaro (1406–1479) =

Venetian merchant, politician and diplomat

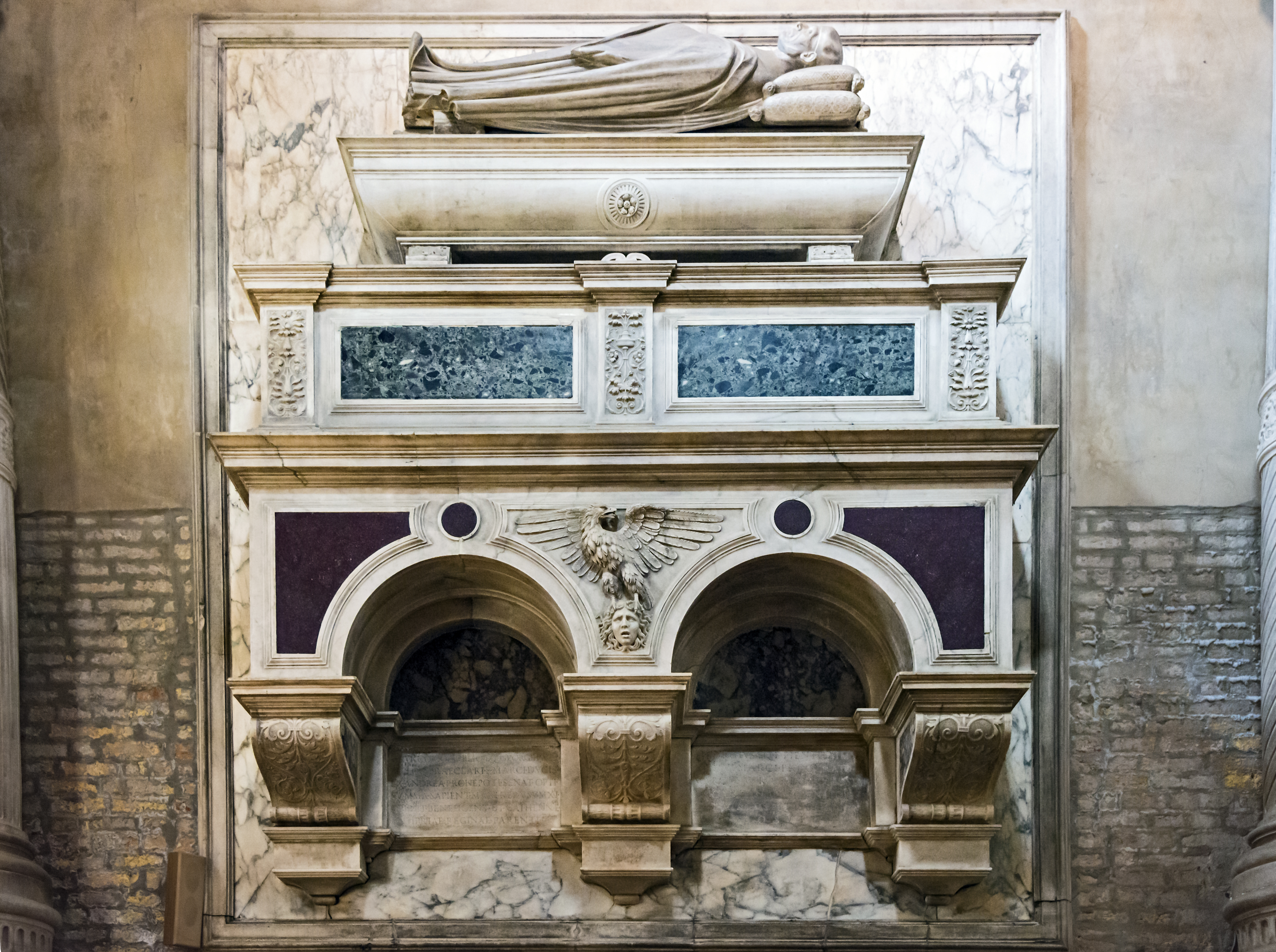
Funeral monument of Marco Cornaro (1511)

Marco Cornaro or Marco Corner (1406–1479) was a merchant, politician and diplomat of the Cornaro family of the Republic of Venice. He had already earned great wealth and made a prestigious marriage before entering politics in middle age. He was deeply involved commercially and politically in the Kingdom of Cyprus. In 1457, he was sentenced to exile from Venice for two years. He spent the next nine years in Cyprus. His daughter, Catherine, became queen of Cyprus in 1468. His grandson, James III, became king in 1473–1474, but died in infancy. In 1474–1476, Cornaro was in Cyprus to stabilize his daughter's rule. He was one of the electors of the doge in 1476 and 1478.

== Family and wealth ==
Cornaro was born in Venice in December 1406. His father, Giorgio di Andrea, was the son of the Doge Marco Cornaro. His mother was Caterina Giustinian di Giustiniano. In 1444, he married Fiorenza, daughter of Niccolò Crispo of the Duchy of the Archipelago and his wife, Valenza. They had two sons and six daughters. Giorgio and Catherine were born in the same year, 1454. His daughter Laura married Marco Dandolo.

Cornaro acquired great wealth through trade. In 1449, he purchased the grain of the Hospitallers' properties in Cyprus. His extensive commercial activities in Cyprus probably explain the late start to his participation in Venetian politics.

== Political career ==
=== Before his daughter's marriage ===
In 1451, Cornaro was attached to the Venetian embassy to the Grand Karaman as a representative of Cyprus. In 1452, he was one of five charged by the republic with entertaining the Emperor Frederick III during his stay in Venice. For his service, Frederick knighted him. From March 1454 to September 1456, he was one of the Savi di Terraferma. From October 1456, he represented his borough of San Polo in the Minor Council. In 1457, he was banished from Venetian territory for two years for having failed to report his brother Andrea's fraudulent election to the Zonta of the Senate. He spent his exile in Cyprus. In 1458, he purchased from Pietro Mocenigo the palace of San Cassiano on the Grand Canal, which he later made his residence.

Cornaro was in Cyprus when King John II died in 1458 and, like most of the Venetian community, supported the accession of John's daughter, Charlotte. He was, however, rumoured to have assisted John's bastard son, Archbishop James of Nicosia, in fleeing Cyprus for Egypt to gain the support of the Sultan Sayf al-Din Inal for his claim to the throne. He may have already been planning to marry his daughter to James. According to a quite different rumour, he had previously worked to supplant James as archbishop in favour of his brother Andrea. According to George Bustron, James's maternal uncle, Markios, threatened to kill Cornaro and was only dissuaded by Marietta de Patras, who pointed out that the rumour was designed to sow discord.

Cornaro returned to Venice in 1464. That summer he was again elected to the Savi and again in 1465. In October 1466, he rejoined the Minor Council. In 1467, he was elected one of the Savi del Consiglio. In October–November 1467, he was sent on an embassy to Bartolomeo Colleoni to secure the latter's alliance against the Sforza. In 1468, he was made provveditore in campo in Venetian Lombardy with a budget of 25,000 ducats to improve its defences. He returned to Venice and worked as an avogador di Comun.

=== After his daughter's marriage ===
On 31 July 1468, Cornaro's daughter Catherine was engaged to the ex-archbishop James, by then King James II of Cyprus. The negotiations for the marriage had been undertaken by Andrea, but Marco helped to secure the immense dowry of 100,000 ducats. He was elected to the Savi again in 1469 and 1471, to the Minor Council in 1470 and to both in 1473 and 1474. In August 1470, he was appointed provveditore in Lombardy. In 1471, he was an ambassador extraordinary at the court of Pope Sixtus IV.

Cornaro was denied permission to go to Cyprus after the death of James II in July 1473. The death of her young son, James III, in 1474 left her the de facto sovereign under the power of the Venetian provveditore. In October 1474, Cornaro was finally permitted to go to Cyprus, where he butted heads with other Venetian officials. He had instructions to preserve native laws and customs. He wrote to the Senate complaining of his daughter's situation. She was given 8,000 ducats. His fellow Venetians considered him as overstepping his bounds. In a letter dated 10 May 1475, the provveditore Pietro Diedo accused him of acting like a king.

By early 1476, Cornaro had returned to Venice. He took part in the election of Andrea Vendramin as doge that year. He was elected one of the Savi in 1477 and was one of those who elected Doge Giovanni Mocenigo in 1478. He died in 1479 and was buried in the church of Santi Apostoli. The Patriarch Maffeo Gherardi and the entire Signoria attended his funeral. In his funeral oration, Pietro Contarini praised Cornaro's honesty: "And how was [his wealth] acquired? Not by acquisitiveness, not by fraud, not by robbery, but by ability, industry and the most honest shrewdness" (At quomodo est adeptus? Non quaestu, non fraude, non rapina, sed ingenio, industria et honestissima solertia).

== Bibliography ==
- Arbel, Benjamin (2013). "A Fresh Look at the Venetian Protectorate of Cyprus (1474–89)". In Candida Syndikus; Sabine Rogge (eds.). Caterina Cornaro: Last Queen of Cyprus and Daughter of Venice. Waxmann. pp. 213–230.
- Gullino, Giuseppe (1983). "Corner, Marco". Dizionario Biografico degli Italiani (in Italian). Vol. 29: Cordier–Corvo. Rome: Istituto dell'Enciclopedia Italiana. ISBN 978-88-12-00032-6.
- Gullino, Giuseppe (1983). "Corner, Giogio". Dizionario Biografico degli Italiani (in Italian). Vol. 29: Cordier–Corvo. Rome: Istituto dell'Enciclopedia Italiana. ISBN 978-88-12-00032-6.
- Hill, George (2010) [1948]. A History of Cyprus. Vol. 3: The Frankish Period, 1432–1571. Cambridge University Press.
- King, Margaret L. (1985). Venetian Humanism in an Age of Patrician Dominance. Princeton University Press.
- Kuršanskis, Michel (1979). "La descendance d'Alexis IV, empereur de Trébizonde: Contribution à la prosopographie des Grands Comnènes". Revue des études byzantines. 37: 239–247.
