= Juan Tafures =

Catalan adventurer

Juan Tafures or Tafurer (died after 1477) was a Catalan adventurer in the mid fifteenth century.

An owner of a merchant ship, Juan landed at Larnaca in Cyprus in July 1457 when James de Lusignan, bastard son of John II of Cyprus and Archbishop of Nicosia, was fleeing his father, as he had murdered the royal chamberlain. Juan brought him on his ship to Rhodes. Juan then joined with him, now deprived of the archbishopric, in his fight against Charlotte for the throne of Cyprus. They reconquered the island by September 1460.

An intimate of the new king, James became master of the royal household and captain of Famagusta. In 1469, James named him Count of Tripoli, a titular dignity, since Tripoli was under the control of the Mamluks. It was with this latter title that he appears in 1473 executing the will of the king.

Under the reign of James's successor, Catherine, Juan violently led the opposition to Venice. He managed to escape their grasp, but his family was carted off to Venice in 1477. After that date, his fate is unknown.
