= Charlotte of Bourbon, Queen of Cyprus =

Charlotte of Bourbon

Queen consort of Cyprus
- Tenure: 25 August 1411 – 15 January 1422
- Born: 1388; France
- Died: 15 January 1422 (aged 33–34); Nicosia, Cyprus
- Burial: Royal Monastery of Saint Dominic's, Nicosia
- Spouse: Janus of Cyprus (m. 1411)
- Issue more...: John II of Cyprus; Anne, Duchess of Savoy
- House: Bourbon
- Father: John I, Count of La Marche
- Mother: Catherine de Vendôme

Charlotte of Bourbon (1388 – 15 January 1422) was the queen consort of Cyprus and titular queen consort of Armenia and Jerusalem through her marriage to King Janus. She was his second wife and the mother of his six legitimate children, including King John II and Anne de Lusignan. Charlotte's influence was instrumental in the revival of French culture at the royal court in Nicosia.

== Life ==
Charlotte was born in France in 1388, one of the seven children of John I, Count of La Marche and Catherine de Vendôme. She had three brothers and three sisters. These were: James II, Count of La Marche, Louis, Count of Vendôme, Jean de Bourbon, Seigneur de Carency and de Duisant, Anne, Countess of Montpensier, Marie de Bourbon, Dame de Bréhencourt, and Isabelle de Bourbon. She also had an illegitimate half-brother by her father's relationship with a mistress.

Charlotte's paternal grandparents were James I, Count of La Marche and Jeanne de Châtillon, and her maternal grandparents were Jean VI, Count of Vendôme and Jeanne of Ponthieu.

=== Queen of Cyprus ===
On 25 August 1411, at Saint Sophia's Cathedral in Nicosia, Cyprus, Charlotte married as his second wife, King Janus of Cyprus and Armenia and titular King of Jerusalem. He was the son of King James I of Cyprus and Helvis of Brunswick-Grubenhagen. Janus and Charlotte had been married by proxy on 2 August 1409 in Melun, France. A document dated 10 January 1409 (Old Style) (19 January 1410 New Style), records the arrangements for Charlotte's voyage from Venice to Cyprus. The chronicle of Amadi records the arrival in Cyprus of damisella Carlotta de Borbon, moglie de re Zegno and her marriage on 25 August 1411. Charlotte's lavish retinue which accompanied her to Cyprus included many musicians.

The marriage of Janus and Charlotte was described as a "cornerstone in the revitalisation of French culture in the Lusignan court that characterised Janus's rule". Following her marriage, she immediately established a socièté courtoise at the royal court at Nicosia, where French literature and music flourished.

Charlotte died on 15 January 1422 of plague. She was buried in the Royal Monastery of Saint Dominic's in Nicosia.

== Issue ==
Together Charlotte and Janus had six children:

- Jacques de Lusignan (died c. 1416)
- King John II of Cyprus and Armenia and titular King of Jerusalem (16 May 1414 – 28 July 1458), he was also titular Prince of Antioch. He married firstly Amadea of Montferrat; he married secondly Helena Palaiologina, by whom he had two daughters including Queen Charlotte of Cyprus. By his Greek mistress Marietta de Patras, he had an illegitimate son Jacques, who later reigned as King James II of Cyprus.
- Unnamed twins (born 7 November 1415), died in early infancy.
- Anne de Lusignan (24 September 1418 – 11 November 1462), married Louis, Duke of Savoy, by whom she had nineteen children.
- Marie de Lusignan (died after 29 April 1437), betrothed to Philippe de Bourbon, Lord of Beaujeu, but she died before the marriage took place.

Royal titles
Preceded by Anglesia Visconti	Queen consort of Cyprus; 1411–1422	Succeeded by Amadea Palaiologina of Monferrato
