= Helena Palaiologina =

Queen of Cyprus and Armenia from 1442 to 1458

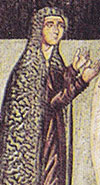

Queen consort of Cyprus and Armenia
- Tenure: 3 February 1442 – 11 April 1458
- Born: Ἑλένη Παλαιολογίνα; 3 February 1428; Castle of Mistras, Morea, Greece
- Died: 11 April 1458 (aged 30); The fortress of Nicosia, Cyprus
- Burial: Royal Monastery of Saint Dominic's, Nicosia
- Spouse: John II of Cyprus
- Issue: Charlotte, Queen of Cyprus; Cleopha de Lusignan
- House: Palaiologos; Lusignan
- Father: Theodore II Palaiologos
- Mother: Cleofa Malatesta
- Religion: Greek Orthodox

Helena Palaiologina (Greek: Ἑλένη Παλαιολογίνα; 3 February 1428 – 11 April 1458) was a Byzantine princess of the Palaiologos family, who became Queen of Cyprus and Armenia, titular queen consort of Jerusalem, and Princess of Antioch through her marriage to King John II of Cyprus and Armenia. She was the mother of Queen Charlotte of Cyprus.

She may have poisoned her son-in-law John of Portugal, and ordered the nose of her husband's mistress to be cut off. She did, however, welcome and assist many Byzantine refugees in Cyprus after the Fall of Constantinople in 1453.

== Early life ==
Helena was born in the castle of Mistras, Morea, Greece on 3 February 1428, the only child of Theodore II Palaiologos, Despot of Morea, and Cleofa Malatesta. Her paternal grandfather was Byzantine emperor Manuel II Palaiologos, and her uncles included emperors John VIII Palaiologos and Constantine XI Palaiologos. When she was five years old, her mother died. Her father never remarried as he was occupied in the war which was fought against the Latin states in Greece for the unification of Morea.

== Queen of Cyprus ==
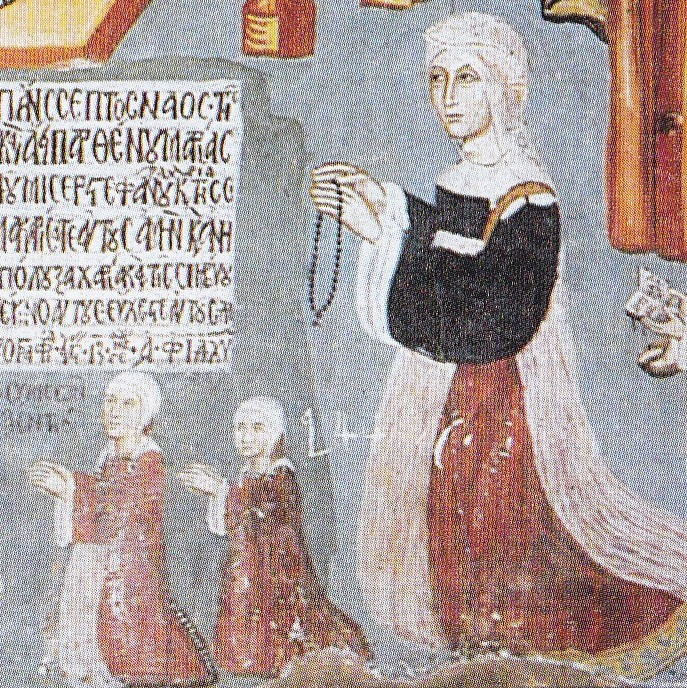
Helena and her daughters

On 3 February 1442 Helena married King John II of Cyprus and Armenia, titular King of Jerusalem and Prince of Antioch at the Cathedral of Saint Sophia in Nicosia. He was the son of King Janus of Cyprus of the Lusignan dynasty and Charlotte de Bourbon-La Marche. Helena was John's second wife, his first wife Amadea of Montferrat having died in September 1440. She had turned fourteen years old on the day of her wedding, and John was twenty-seven. The Chronicle of Amadi recorded her arrival in Cyprus on 2 February and her subsequent marriage the following day.

Shortly after their marriage, Helena ordered the nose of her husband's mistress, Marietta de Patras, to be cut off. Marietta had borne John a son, James, several years before his marriage to Helena. Later, Helena and James would become bitter enemies, each striving to gain influence over King John. Helena resented her husband having appointed James Archbishop of Nicosia when he was sixteen years old. When the boy murdered Iacopo Urri, the royal chamberlain on 1 April 1457, he was removed from office and fled the island, but King John pardoned him and the archbishopric was restored to him.

Helena was largely responsible for the revival of Greek influence in Cyprus due to the numerous members of the Byzantine court who arrived in her wake and were given positions at the Lusignan court. This led to a renewal of ties with the Byzantine Empire. After the Fall of Constantinople to the Ottoman Empire in 1453, she welcomed and gave assistance to many Byzantine refugees who had fled to Cyprus. She was described as having been "stronger in character than her husband". She took charge of the kingdom, and her policies in favour of the Orthodox faith and Greek culture enraged the Franks who looked upon her as a dangerous enemy; however she had become far too powerful for them to attack. Pope Pius II also condemned her for supporting the Orthodox Church, and her endowment of 15,000 ducats per annum to the monastery of Saint George of Mangana also drew much criticism as it was considered to have been "extravagant generosity in impoverished times". The Greek Cypriots, on the other hand, revered Helena as a great heroine due to her bold, decisive character in looking after their interests.

In 1457, she may have poisoned her son-in-law, John of Portugal, who had given his support to the Catholic party, thus incurring her wrath and enmity; also she wished for her daughter to marry Louis of Savoy. Whilst Helena did arrange for it, the marriage between Charlotte and Louis took place in 1459, when Helena and King John were both dead, and Charlotte by that time had succeeded her father to the throne of Cyprus.

== Death ==
Helena died on 11 April 1458 in the fortress of Nicosia where she and King John had barricaded themselves during the insurrection of his illegitimate son, James. She was buried in the Royal Monastery of Saint Dominic's. John died the same year, and was succeeded by his only surviving legitimate child, Charlotte.

== Issue ==
Together John and Helena had two daughters:

- Charlotte, Queen of Cyprus (28 June 1444 – 16 July 1487), married firstly in May 1456 Infante John of Portugal; secondly on 4 October 1459, Louis, King of Cyprus, by whom she had an unnamed son who died within a month of his birth. Charlotte succeeded to the throne of Cyprus in 1458.
- Cleopha de Lusignan (died 8 June 1448)

Royal titles
| Vacant Title last held by Amadea Palaiologina of Monferrato | Queen consort of Cyprus; 1442–1458 | Vacant Title next held by Catherine Cornaro |
