= Amadea Palaiologina of Montferrat =

Queen consort of Cyprus (1418–1440)

Queen consort of Cyprus
- Tenure: 1437–1440
- Coronation: 3 July 1440
- Born: 1418
- Died: 1440 (aged 21–22)
- Burial: Convent of San Domenico
- Spouse: John II of Cyprus
- House: Palaeologus-Montferrat
- Father: John Jacob, Marquis of Montferrat
- Mother: Joanna of Savoy

Amadea Palaiologina of Monferrato (1418–1440), was a queen consort of Cyprus as the wife of King John II of Cyprus.

Amadea was the daughter of John Jacob, Marquess of Montferrat and Joanna of Savoy, daughter of Amadeus VII, Count of Savoy.

On 3 July 1440, Amadea married John II of Cyprus, son of Janus of Cyprus and his second wife Charlotte of Bourbon, and crowned queen. The wedding was celebrated by proxy in 1437, Amadea arrived in Cyprus in June 1440. The marriage was the result of interest in the Eastern Mediterranean Paleologi.

Upon the marriage by proxy in 1437, Amedea became queen consort of Cyprus, Jerusalem and Armenia. The coronation took place in the church of Hagia Sophia in Nicosia on 3 July 1440.

Amadea died suddenly two months after the marriage, she had no children. She was buried beside Queen Charlotte in the convent of San Domenico.

Less than two years later, John, who needed an heir to the throne, married Helena Palaiologina, who bore a daughter, Charlotte of Cyprus.

Royal titles
Preceded by Charlotte de Bourbon	Queen consort of Cyprus; 1440	Succeeded by Helena Palaiologina
