= Marietta de Patras =

Mistress of John II of Cyprus (died 1503)

- Born: Unknown; Patras, Greece
- Died: 12 April 1503; Padua, Italy
- Burial place: Church of Saint Augustines's, Padua
- Known for: Royal mistress
- Partner: King John II of Cyprus
- Children: King James II of Cyprus

Marietta de Patras (died 12 April 1503) was the Greek mistress of King John II of Cyprus and the mother of his illegitimate son King James II of Cyprus. Shortly after King John's marriage to Helena Palaiologina, the new queen ordered that Marietta's nose be cut off. Following the death of her son, she was taken to Venice where she was kept in semi-captivity.

== King's mistress ==
Marietta was born on an unknown date in Patras, Greece. It is not known when she arrived in Cyprus, however, she became the mistress of King John II of Cyprus before 1438. The Chronicle of Florio Bustron describes her as having been "very beautiful and prudent". Together King John and Marietta had one son, King James II of Cyprus (1439/1440 – 10 July 1473), who reigned from 1463 to 1473.

In February 1442, King John married his second wife, the fourteen-year-old Byzantine princess Helena Palaiologina. His first wife Amadea Palaiologina of Monferrato had died childless in September 1440. Upon being learning of Marietta and her son, Queen Helena ordered for Marietta's nose to be cut off.

Queen Helena continued her enmity towards James. In 1456, he was appointed Archbishop of Nicosia, an act which enraged her. When he murdered Iacopo Urri, the Royal Chamberlain on 1 April 1457 and escaped to the island of Rhodes after having been removed from office, the King pardoned him and restored him to his archbishopric which further angered the Queen. In 1458, both King John and Queen Helena died. The crown of Cyprus passed to John's only surviving daughter by Helena, Charlotte, who reigned as Queen regnant. James, however, challenged her right to occupy the throne, and with the help of the Mamluk Sultan of Egypt, James forced Charlotte to flee Cyprus, and in 1463, he was crowned king.

In 1468, King James gave Marietta the villages of Pano Kivides, Lysos, Peristerona, and Pelathousa as gifts. Her son married Catherine Cornaro in 1472, by whom he had one posthumous son, James III of Cyprus; he also had four illegitimate children by a mistress.

== Captivity in Venice ==
When James died on 10 July 1473, Marietta was taken to Venice and then to Padua, where she was placed in semi-captivity. A decision of the Council of Ten of Venice dated 22 January 1479 records that Marietta was placed under the control of magister puerorum regiorum Christopher Mutius. Marietta died on 12 April 1503 at Padua. She was buried in the church of Saint Augustine's. An epitaph records the death of Marieta mater quondam Jacobi Cypri Regis. Through her son's illegitimate children, she has numerous descendants in the 21st century.
