= Pietro Contarini (died 1495) =

First page of Contarini's collection of elegies "to Gellia"

Pietro Contarini (died April 1495) was a Venetian patrician, administrator and humanist.

== Life ==
Contarini was born around 1446 to Adorno Contarini and his second wife, Orsa Trevisan. He belonged to the Santi Apostoli branch of the Contarini family. His father having died, he was presented by his mother to the Avogadori di Comun on 27 November 1464 when he was eighteen. In 1468, he was an advocatus per omnes curias, one of the staff lawyers in the Doge's Palace.

Contarini's political career is difficult to reconstruct because of the existence of contemporaries of the same name. He may have been the podestà of Oderzo in 1470 and the provveditore of Peschiera del Garda in 1480. In 1483, he married Isabetta, daughter of Pietro Gradenigo. In 1487, he was one of the five savi of the Rialto. In 1489–1490, he was the castellan and provveditore of the castle of Koroni. On 30 October 1494, he was commissioned as the first Venetian governor of the Duchy of the Archipelago, based on Naxos. He was given 500 ducats a year for all his expenses, including his own salary. His commission was for two years. He died in office in April 1495.

== Works ==
On 27 August 1479 in Santi Apostoli, Contarini delivered the eulogy at the funeral of Marco Cornaro, In funere Marci Cornelii oratio. It was printed that same year by Filippo Veneto.

Contarini wrote a collection of elegies in Latin elegiac couplets, Ad Gelliam elegiarum libri tres. In form, they are letters in praise of a girl named Gellia addressed to other patricians, including Benedetto Sanudo and Marcantonio Morosini. In one case, Contarini addresses Gentile Bellini, praising him for a portrait of Gellia. In practice, the elegies are probably a life's work based on his classical learning, especially of Tibullus, Catullus and Ovid. They are preserved in a single manuscript. The same manuscript contains a note from Paolo Ramusio praising Contarini's poetry. Ad Gelliam is the only Venetian example of the elegy form from the fifteenth century. It is still unpublished.

When Filippo Buonaccorsi visited Venice in 1486, he met Contarini. He recorded in De his quae a Venetis tentata sunt how, when Doeg Marco Barbarigo died (14 August 1486), some Ottoman ambassadors requested permission to attend the funeral. Contarini was assigned as one of their escorts in order to explain the ceremonies. Buonaccorsi notes that Contarini was "an accurate and prudent writer of the history of Venice." If he did write such a history, presumably in Latin, it does not survive. Possibly Buonaccorsi was referring only to Contarini's private notes. Marco Dandolo informed Buonaccorsi of Contarini's death in a letter.

== Bibliography ==
- Frasson, Paolo (1983). "Contarini, Pietro". Dizionario Biografico degli Italiani (in Italian). Vol. 28: Conforto–Cordero. Rome: Istituto dell'Enciclopedia Italiana. ISBN 978-88-12-00032-6.
- King, Margaret L. (1985). Venetian Humanism in an Age of Patrician Dominance. Princeton University Press.
- Labalme, Patricia H.; White, Laura Sanguineti, eds. (2008). Venice, Cità Excelentissima: Selections from the Renaissance Diaries Marino Sanudo. Translated by Linda L. Carroll. Johns Hopkins University Press.
- Molmenti, Pompeo (1928). La storia di Venezia nella vita privata dalle origini alla caduta della Repubblica. Vol. 2 (7th ed.). Bergamo.
- Nassichuk, John (2018). "Biblical Elegy and Quattrocento Marian Encomium: Marcantonio Sabellico's Carmina de Beata Virgine Maria". In Diane Apostolos-Cappadona (ed.). Biblical Women and the Arts. Biblical Reception. Vol. 5. T&T Clark. pp. 143–157.
- Segarizzi, Arnaldo (1914). "Notizie varie: Gentile Bellini". Nuovo archivio veneto. New series. 27 (1): 238–239.
- Setton, Kenneth Meyer (1978). The Papacy and the Levant (1204–1571). Vol. II: The Fifteenth Century. The American Philosophical Society.
