= James III of Cyprus =

King of Cyprus from 1473 to 1474

James III

King of Cyprus
- Reign: 6 August 1473 – 26 August 1474
- Predecessor: James II
- Successor: Catherine Cornaro
- Regent: Catherine Cornaro
- Born: 6 August 1473; Famagusta, Kingdom of Cyprus
- Died: 26 August 1474 (aged 1); Famagusta, Kingdom of Cyprus
- Burial: Cathedral of Saint Nicholas
- House: Poitiers-Lusignan
- Father: James II of Cyprus
- Mother: Catherine Cornaro

James III of Cyprus (or Jacques III de Lusignan) (6 August 1473 – 26 August 1474) was the only child from the marriage of James II of Cyprus and Catherine Cornaro. He died as an infant, leaving his mother as the last queen of Cyprus. His death paved the way for the Republic of Venice to gain control of Cyprus.

== Biography ==
James III's parents were James II of Cyprus and Catherine Cornaro. James II had married the 14-year-old Venetian, Catherine Cornaro, by proxy in Venice, on 30 July 1468, seeking political support. She travelled to Cyprus and they married in person in Famagusta in October or November, 1472. James II died on 10 July 1473, a month before his son's birth. However, a three-day festival was held to celebrate the newborn in the capital, Nicosia, in which all the prisoners were released and a large feast was held on 26 and 29 September.

The infant was baptized on 26 September, and received the name James in memory of his father. His mother had assumed the regency before his birth, but her power was practiced by her Venetian relatives. In November 1473, there were unsuccessful attempts to seize power by nobles of the Crown of Aragon, during which Catherine Cornaro's uncle, Andrea Cornaro, was assassinated.

James died in Famagusta, probably of malaria, on August 26, 1474, twenty days after his first birthday. He was buried along with his father in the Cathedral of Saint Nicholas in Famagusta. With his death, the Lusignan dynasty of Cyprus became extinct and the island lost its independence. His sudden death opened the doors to the rule of the Venetian Republic over the island. His mother, Catherine Cornaro, was appointed as the Queen of Cyprus, under strict Venetian surveillance and was forced to abdicate in 1489 and lived in Asolo until 1509 where she fled to exile in Venice where she died in 1510.

== Sources ==
- Boni de Nobili, Francesco (2012). Caterina Cornaro (in Italian). Godega di Sant'Urbano: De Bastiani.
- De Girolami Cheney, Liana (2013). "Caterina Cornaro, Queen of Cyprus". In Barrett-Graves, Debra (ed.). The Emblematic Queen Extra-Literary Representations of Early Modern Queenship. Palgrave Macmillan.
- Fileti, Felice (2009). I Lusignan di Cipro (in Italian). Florence: Atheneum.
- Hill, George (1948). A History of Cyprus. Vol. The Frankish Period, 1432–1571. Cambridge University Press.

| Preceded by James II | King of Cyprus; 1473–1474 | Succeeded by Catherine Cornaro |
