= Mamluk campaign against Cyprus =

Mamluk campaign against Cyprus may refer to:

- Mamluk raid on Cyprus (1368)
- Mamluk campaigns against Cyprus (1424–1426)
