= Catherine Cornaro =

Queen of Cyprus from 1474 to 1489

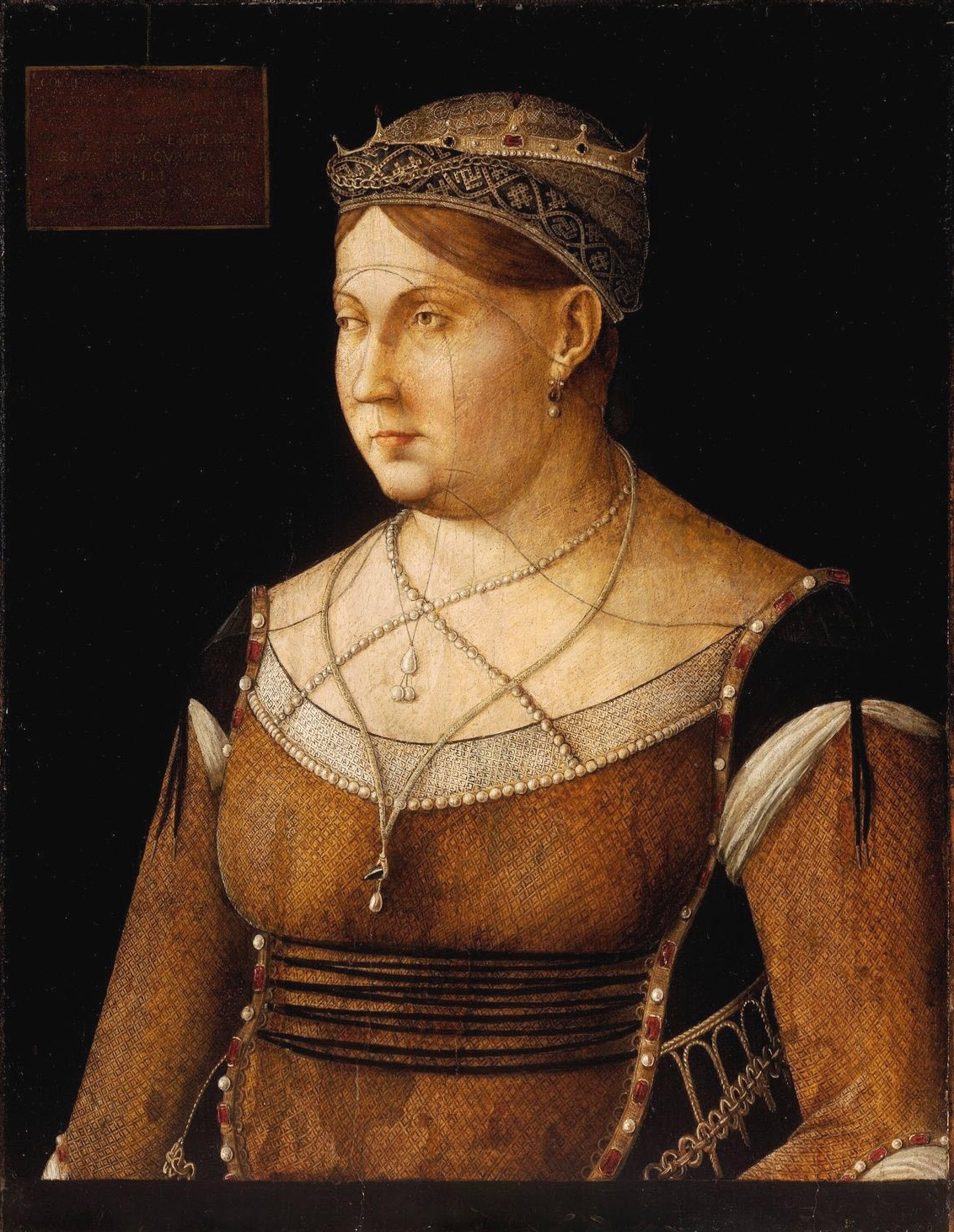
- Portrait of Catherine Cornaro by Gentile Bellini, c. 1500

Queen of Cyprus
- Reign: 26 August 1474 – 26 February 1489
- Predecessor: James III
- Successor: Monarchy abolished

Queen regent of Cyprus
- Regency: 10 July 1473 – 26 August 1474
- Monarch: James III

Queen consort of Cyprus
- Tenure: November 1472 – 10 July 1473
- Born: 25 November 1454; Venice, Republic of Venice
- Died: 10 July 1510 (aged 55); Venice, Republic of Venice
- Burial: San Salvador, Venice
- Spouse: James II of Cyprus
- Issue: James III of Cyprus
- House: Cornaro
- Father: Marco Cornaro
- Mother: Fiorenza Crispo

Catherine Cornaro (Venetian: Catarina Corner; Italian: Caterina Cornaro or Corner; Greek: Αικατερίνη Κορνάρο, romanized: Aikateríni Kornáro; 25 November 1454 – 10 July 1510) was the last monarch of the Kingdom of Cyprus, also holding the titles of Queen of Jerusalem and Queen of Armenia. She became queen consort of Cyprus by marriage to James II of Cyprus, and then regent of Cyprus during the minority of her son James III of Cyprus in 1473 and 1474, and finally queen regnant of Cyprus upon his death. She reigned from 26 August 1474 to 26 February 1489 and was declared a "daughter of Saint Mark" so the Republic of Venice could claim control of Cyprus after the death of her husband.

== Life ==
Catherine (also known as Caterina) was a daughter of the Venetian Marco Cornaro, knight of the Holy Roman Empire, and Fiorenza Crispo. She was the younger sister of the Nobil Huomo Giorgio Cornaro (1452 – 31 July 1527), "Padre della Patria" and knight of the Holy Roman Empire. Caterina's mother was of Greek descent.

The Cornaro family had produced four doges. Her family had long associations with Cyprus, especially with regard to trade and commerce. In the Episkopi area, in the Limassol District, the Cornaro family administered various sugar mills and exported Cypriot products to Venice.

Catherine was painted by Giorgione, Gentile Bellini, Albrecht Dürer and Titian.

=== Succession of James II ===
On the death of the Cypriot king John II in 1458, the succession was disputed between his daughter Charlotte and her illegitimate half-brother James, who tried to seize the island. On the strength of the marriage of Louis of Savoy to Charlotte, the duke of Savoy claimed the island and Charlotte was named queen. In 1468, Catherine, through negotiations by her father and uncle, was offered to James as his wife. The marriage was extremely advantageous to the Republic of Venice as it could henceforth secure the commercial rights and other privileges of Venice in Cyprus. The proposal was agreed to, and the contract was signed in 1468, strengthening James's position.

=== Queen consort ===
Thus in 1468, James II, otherwise known as James the Bastard, became king of Cyprus. He and Catherine married in Venice on 30 July 1468 by proxy when she was 14 years old. She set sail to Cyprus in November 1472 and married James in person at Famagusta.

=== Regent ===
James died soon after the wedding due to a sudden illness and, according to his will, Catherine, who at the time was pregnant, acted as regent. As soon as the Venetian fleet sailed away, a plot to depose the infant James III of Cyprus in favour of Charlotte, John's legitimate daughter, broke out, and Catherine was kept a prisoner. The Venetians returned, and order was soon restored, but the republic was meditating the seizure of Cyprus, although it had no valid title.

=== Monarch ===
Catherine became monarch when James III died in August 1474 after his first birthday, probably from illness, thought it was rumored that he had been poisoned by Venice or Charlotte's partisans. The kingdom had long since declined, and had been a tributary state of the Mamluks since 1426. Under Catherine, who ruled Cyprus from 1474 to 1489, the island was controlled by Venetian merchants.

In 1488, Venice, fearing that Sultan Bayezid II intended to attack Cyprus, and having also discovered a plot to marry Catherine to Alfonso II of Naples, decided to recall the Queen to Venice and formally annex the island. In February 1489, the Venetian government persuaded Catherine to cede her rights as ruler of Cyprus to the Doge of Venice—and by extension the Venetian government as a whole—as she had no heir.

On 14 March 1489, she was forced to abdicate and sell the administration of the country to the Republic of Venice.

According to the contemporary chronicler Georgios Boustronios:

on 15 February 1489 the Queen exited from Nicosia in order to go to Famagusta, to leave [Cyprus]. And when she went on horseback wearing a black silken cloak, with all the ladies and the knights in her company [...] Her eyes, moreover did not cease to shed tears throughout the procession. The people likewise shed many tears.

=== Later life ===
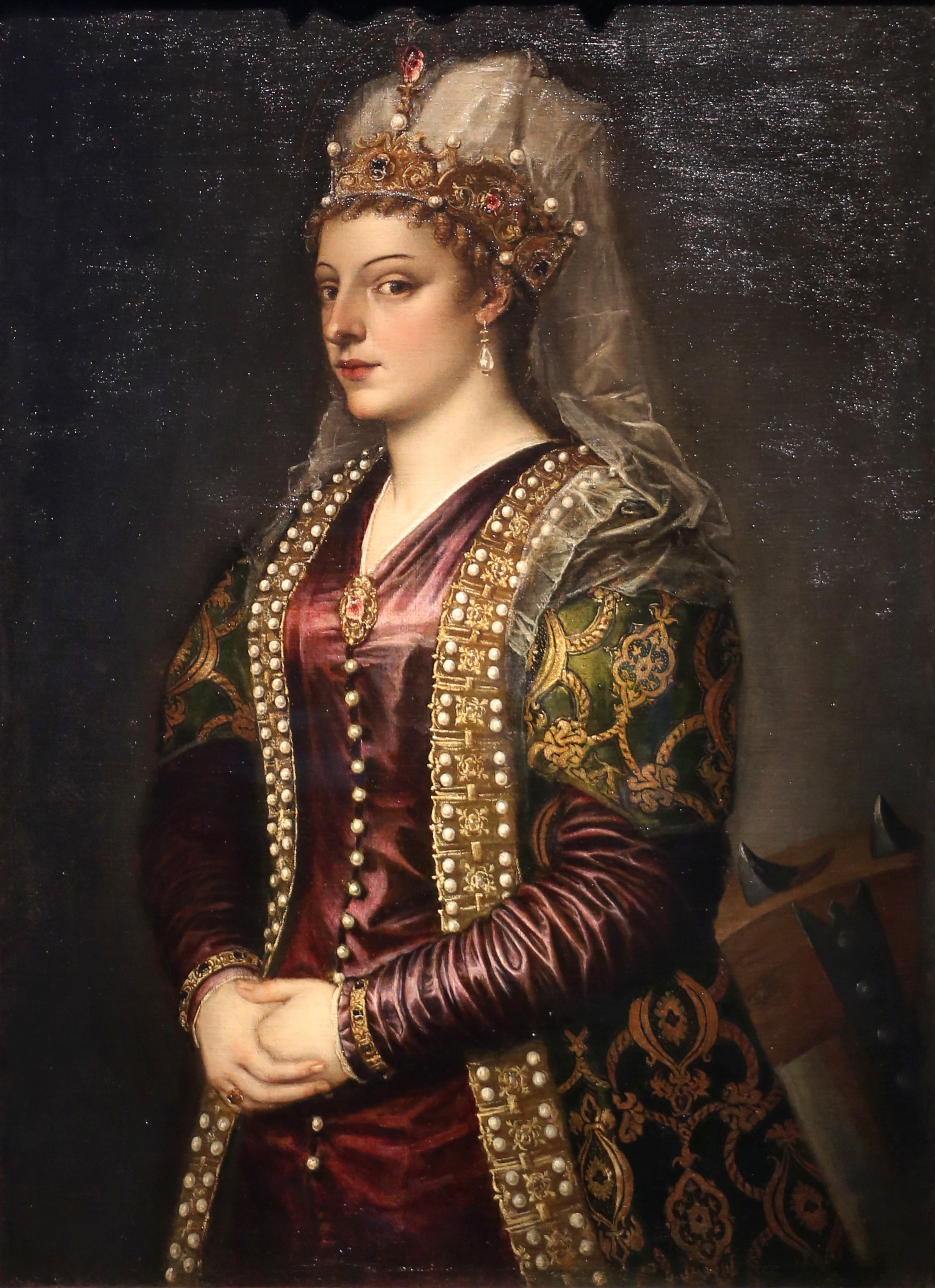
Posthumous portrait 1542 by Titian, of Catherine Carnaro as Saint Catherine of Alexandria

The last Crusader state became a colony of Venice, and as compensation, Catherine was allowed to retain the title of queen and was made lady of Asolo, a county on the Terraferma of the Republic of Venice in the Veneto region, in 1489. Asolo soon gained a reputation as a court of literary and artistic distinction, mainly as a result of it being the fictitious setting for Pietro Bembo's platonic dialogues on love, Gli Asolani. Catherine lived in Asolo until 1509, when the League of Cambrai sacked the town; she then fled to Venice, where she lived for another year, dying on 10 July 1510. She was entombed in the Church of San Salvador in Venice.

== Legacy ==
A libretto based on her life by Jules-Henri Vernoy de Saint-Georges formed the basis of the operas Catharina Cornaro (1841) by Franz Lachner, La reine de Chypre (1841) by Fromental Halévy, and Caterina Cornaro (1844) by Gaetano Donizetti.

The Cornaro Institute, a charitable organisation founded by the artist Stass Paraskos in the city of Larnaca for the promotion of art and other culture, memorialised her name in Cyprus, prior to its closure by Larnaca Municipality in 2017.

In October 2011, the Cyprus Antiquities Department announced a one million euro project to restore a part-medieval mansion in Potamia said to be Catherine Cornaro's summer palace. The project aimed to create a cultural centre in the mansion's west wing, with the work continuing in stages for three years depending on funds. According to the Cypriot Mail however, the Cyprus Antiquities Department stated in October 2012 that there was no evidence Queen Catherine ever stayed there, with the newspaper quoting the department's archaeological officer Evi Fiouri as saying the department has never referred to the structure as the queen's summer palace but simply as the medieval mansion of Potamia. "As the antiquities department we never said this, it seems like it went down in tradition as this," said Fiouri. "We don't know how it started."

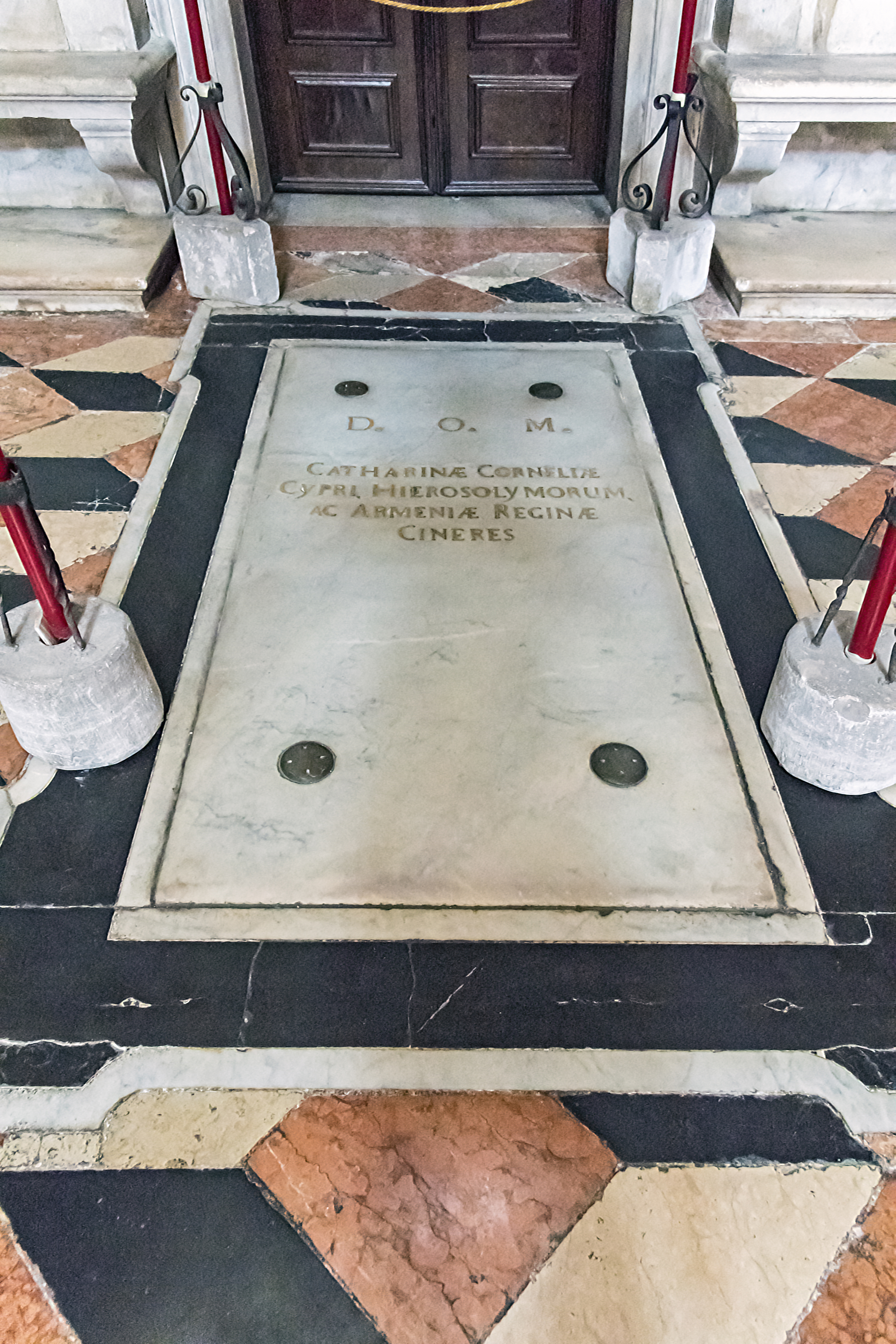
Catherine's tombstone

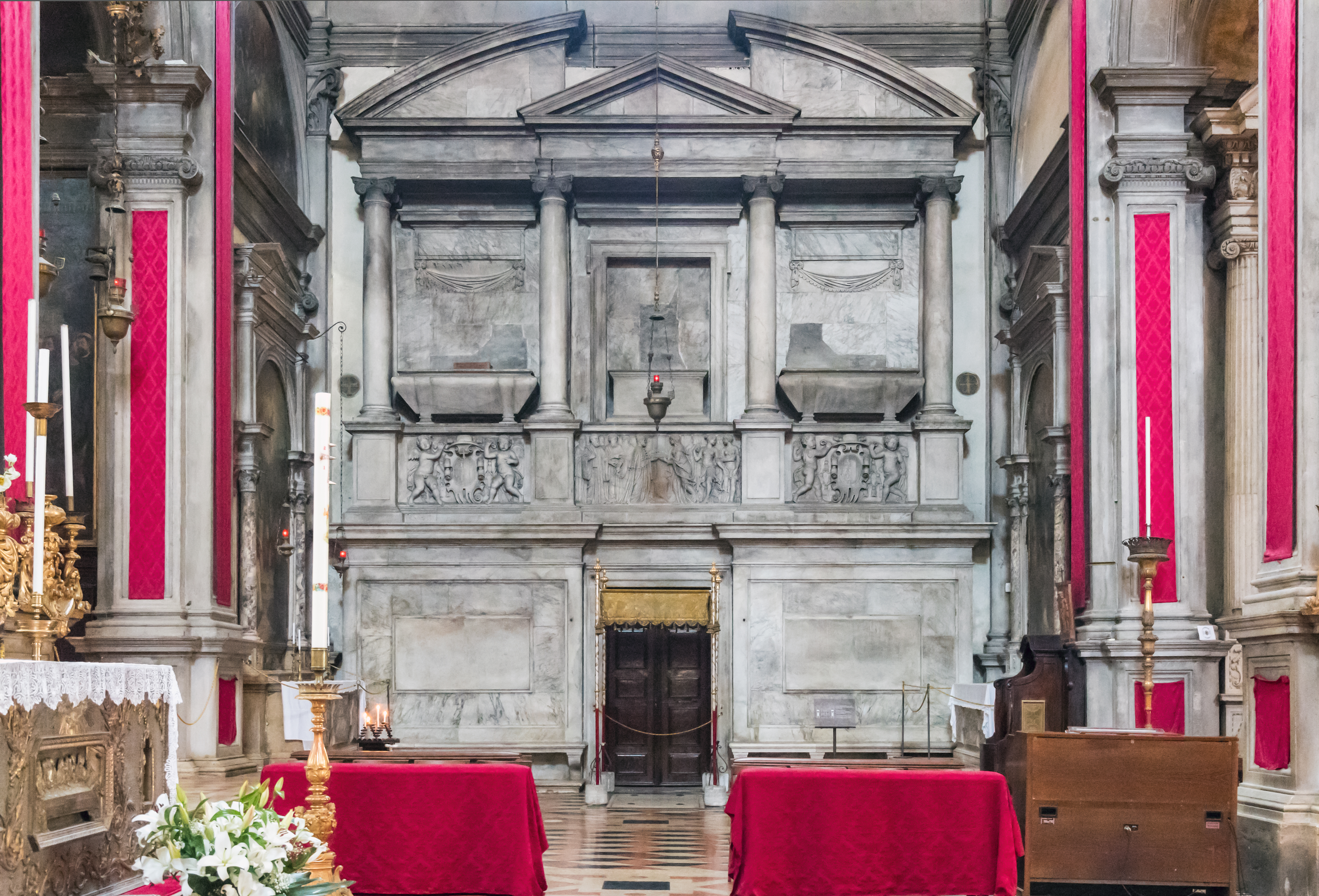
Her funerary monument

== Sources ==
- De Girolami Cheney, Liana (2013). "Caterina Cornaro, Queen of Cyprus". In Barrett-Graves, Debra (ed.). The Emblematic Queen Extra-Literary Representations of Early Modern Queenship. Palgrave Macmillan.
- Luke, Harry (1975). "The Kingdom of Cyprus, 1369—1489". In Setton, K. M.; Hazard, H. W. (eds.). A History of the Crusades, The Fourteenth and Fifteenth Centuries. University of Wisconsin Press.
- Mellersh, H. E. L.; Williams, Neville (1999). Chronology of world history. ABC-CLIO. ISBN 978-1-57607-155-7.
- McNeill, William H. (1974). Venice: The Hinge of Europe, 1081-1797. University of Chicago Press.

Royal titles
Preceded by Helena Palaiologina	Queen consort of Cyprus; 1472–1473	Kingdom dissolved
Regnal titles
Preceded by James III	Queen regnant of Cyprus; 1474–1489	Kingdom dissolved
