= Kingdom of Cyprus =

Medieval Christian kingdom established after the Third Crusade (1192–1489)

Kingdom of Cyprus Royaume de Chypre (French) Regnum Cypri (Latin)
- 1192–1489
- Royal banner of Janus of Cyprus (15th century) Coat of arms

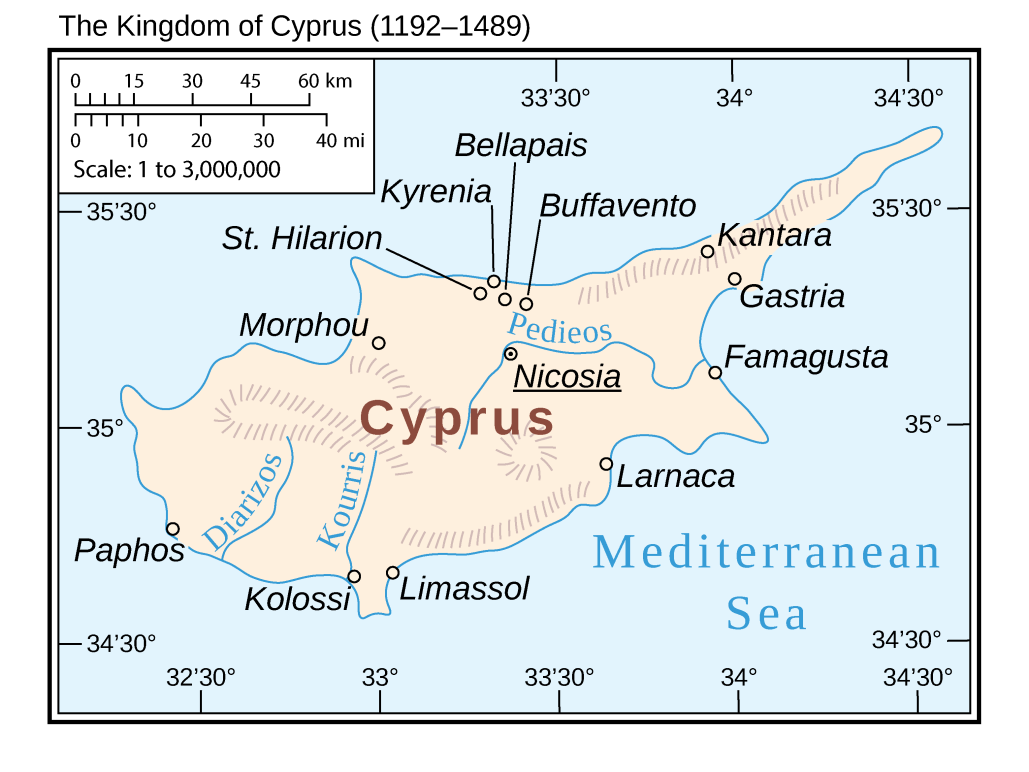
- Cities of medieval Cyprus (1192–1489)
- Status: Independent Christian kingdom (1192–1198/1268–1372) Tributary state of the Armenian Kingdom of Cilicia (1198–1229) Tributary state of the Holy Roman Empire (1229–1268) Tributary state of the Republic of Genoa (1372–1426) Tributary state of the Mamluk Sultanate (1426–1489)
- Capital: Nicosia
- Common languages: Latin (official/ceremonial); Greek (native language); Old French (popular); Italian; French; Arabic; Armenian
- Religion: Catholic Christianity (State religion); Greek Orthodox Christianity (popular)
- Government: Feudal monarchy
- Monarch
  - 1192–1194: Guy of Lusignan (first)
  - 1474–1489: Catherine Cornaro (last)
- Legislature: Haute Cour
- Historical era: Middle Ages
  - Established: 1192
  - Disestablished: 1489
- Currency: French denier, gros
Preceded by
| Theme of Cyprus |
| Cyprus under the Knights Templar |
| Armenian Kingdom of Cilicia |
Succeeded by
| Venetian Cyprus |
- Today part of: Cyprus; Mersin Province (Turkey)

The Kingdom of Cyprus (French: Royaume de Chypre; Latin: Regnum Cypri) was a medieval kingdom of the Crusader states that existed between 1192 and 1489. Initially ruled as an independent Christian kingdom, it was established by the French House of Lusignan after the Third Crusade. It comprised the island of Cyprus and, on the Anatolia mainland, Antalya between 1361 and 1373, and Corycus between 1361 and 1448.

== History ==
=== Third Crusade ===
The island of Cyprus was conquered by Richard I of England in 1191 during the Third Crusade, from Isaac Komnenos, an upstart local governor, Byzantine prince, and self-proclaimed emperor of the Byzantine Empire. Richard I did not intend to conquer the island until his fleet was scattered by a storm en route to the siege of Acre (1189–1191). The three ships were wrecked and sank in sight of the port of Limassol. The shipwrecked survivors were taken prisoner by Komnenos, and when a ship bearing Richard I's sister Joan and bride Berengaria entered the port, Komnenos refused their request to disembark for fresh water. Richard I and the rest of his fleet arrived shortly afterwards. Upon hearing of the imprisonment of his shipwrecked comrades and the insults offered to his bride and sister, Richard I met Komnenos in battle. There were rumours that Komnenos was secretly in agreement with Saladin to protect himself from his enemies, the Angelos family, the ruling family in the Byzantine capital of Constantinople.

Control of Cyprus would give Richard I an extremely valuable strategic base to launch further Crusade operations. The English army engaged the Cypriots on the shores of Limassol with English archers and heavily armoured knights. Komnenos and the remainder of the army escaped to the hills at nightfall, but Richard I and his troops tracked him down and raided his camp before dawn. Komnenos escaped again with a small number of men. The next day, many Cypriot nobles came to Richard I to swear fealty.

Fearing treachery at the hands of the invaders, Komnenos fled after making this pledge to Richard I and escaped to the stronghold of Kantara. Some weeks after Richard I's marriage to Berengaria in Limassol on 12 May 1191, Komnenos attempted an escape by boat to the mainland but he was apprehended at Cape St. Andrea and later imprisoned in the castle of Markappos in Syria, where he died shortly afterwards. Meanwhile, Richard I resumed his journey to Acre and, with much needed respite, new funds and reinforcements, set sail for the Holy Land accompanied by the King of Jerusalem, Guy of Lusignan and other high ranking nobles. He left garrisons in the towns and castles of the island before he departed and the island itself was left in charge of Richard of Canville and Robert of Thurnham.

Richard I confiscated the property of Cypriots who had fought against him. He also imposed a 50% capital levy on the island in return for confirming its laws and customs. He also ordered Cypriot men to shave their beards. There was a rebellion led by a relative of Isaac's, but it was crushed by Robert of Thurnham, who hanged the leader. Richard rebuked Robert for this execution, since executing a man who claimed to be king was an affront to royal dignity. Some details of the brief English period on Cyprus can be found in the Chronicle of Meaux Abbey, possibly derived from Robert of Thurnham, who had a relationship with the abbey.

=== Knights Templar ===
When Richard I of England realised that Cyprus would prove to be a difficult territory to maintain and oversee whilst launching offensives in the Holy Land, he sold it to the Knights Templar for 100,000 bezants, 40,000 of which was to be paid immediately, with the remainder paid in instalments. The severity of their rule in Cyprus quickly incurred the hatred of the native population. On Easter Day in 1192, the Cypriots attempted a massacre of their Templar rulers; however, due to prior knowledge of the attack and a limited number of troops, the Templars had taken refuge in their stronghold at Nicosia. A siege ensued and the Templars, realising their dire circumstances and their besiegers' reluctance to bargain, sallied out into the streets at dawn one morning, taking the Cypriots completely by surprise. The subsequent massacre was merciless and widespread and though Templar rule was restored following the event, the military order was reluctant to continue rule and allegedly begged Richard I to take Cyprus back. Richard I took them up on the offer, and the Templars returned to Syria, only with a few holdings on the island. The small number of Roman Catholics on the island were mainly confined to some coastal cities, such as Famagusta, as well as inland Nicosia, the traditional capital. Roman Catholics kept the reins of power and control, while the Orthodox inhabitants lived in the countryside; this was much the same as the arrangement in the Kingdom of Jerusalem. The independent Eastern Orthodox Church of Cyprus, with its own archbishop and subject to no patriarch, was allowed to remain on the island, but the Roman Catholic Church largely displaced it in stature and holding property.

=== Guy and Aimery ===
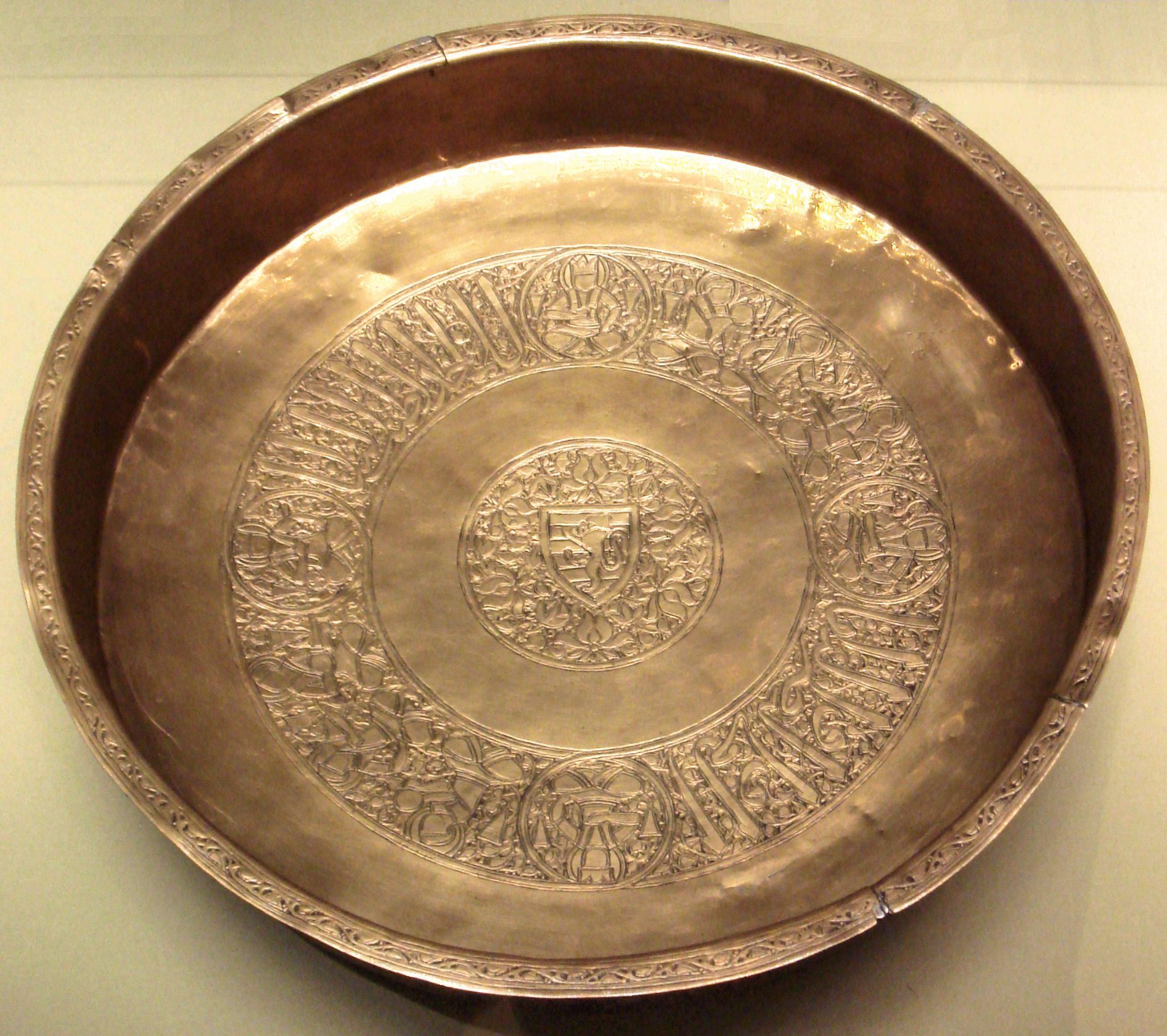
Plate of the House of Lusignan, with coat of arms at the centre. Early 14th century, Cyprus. Louvre Museum.

In the meantime, the hereditary queen of Jerusalem, Sybilla, had died, and opposition to the rule of her husband, king consort Guy of Lusignan, greatly increased to the point that he was ousted from his claim to the crown of Jerusalem. Since Guy was a long-time vassal of Richard I, he offered Guy the lordship of the kingdom of Cyprus, allowing his friend the opportunity to save face and keep some sort of power in the East whilst simultaneously ridding himself of a troublesome fief. It is unclear whether Richard I gave him the territory or sold it and it is highly unlikely that Richard I was paid, even if a deal was struck.

In 1194, Guy died without any heirs and so his older brother, Aimery, became King Aimery of Cyprus, a crown and title which was approved in 1196 by Holy Roman Emperor Henry VI.

After the death of Aimery of Lusignan, the Kingdom continually passed to a series of young boys who grew up as kings. The House of Ibelin, which had held much power in Jerusalem prior to its fall, acted as regents during these early years. In 1229, one of the Ibelin regents was forced out of power by Holy Roman Emperor Frederick II, who brought the struggle between the Guelphs and Ghibellines to the island. Frederick II's supporters were defeated on Cyprus in 1232 at the Battle of Agridi, although the conflict lasted longer in the Kingdom of Jerusalem and Holy Roman Empire. Frederick II's Hohenstaufen descendants continued to rule as kings of Jerusalem until 1268 when Hugh III of Cyprus claimed the title and its territory of Acre for himself upon the death of Conrad III of Jerusalem, thus uniting the two kingdoms. The territory in Palestine was finally lost while Henry II was king in 1291, but the kings of Cyprus continued to claim the title.

=== Governance ===
Like Jerusalem, Cyprus had an Haute Cour (High Court), although it was less powerful than it had been in Jerusalem. The island was richer and more feudal than Jerusalem, so the king had more personal wealth and could afford to ignore the Haute Cour. The most important vassal family was the multi-branch House of Ibelin. However, the king was often in conflict with the Italian merchants, especially because Cyprus had become the centre of European trade with Africa and Asia after the fall of Acre in 1291.

The kingdom eventually came to be dominated more and more in the 14th century by Genoese merchants, under the leadership of the Republic of Genoa. Cyprus therefore sided with the Avignon Papacy in the Western Schism, in the hope that the French would be able to drive out the Genoese. The Mameluks then made the kingdom a tributary state in 1426; the remaining monarchs gradually lost almost all independence, until 1489 when the last queen, Catherine Cornaro, was forced to sell the island to Venice.

== Economy ==
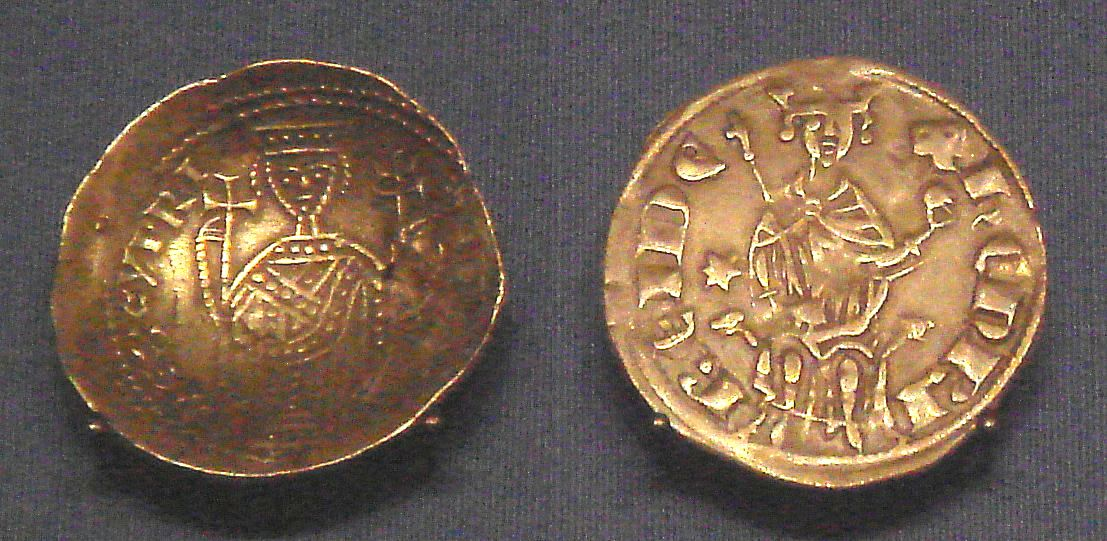
Cyprus gold bezant, derived from Byzantine design, 1218–1253 (left), and Cyprus Western-style silver gros 1285–1324 (right).

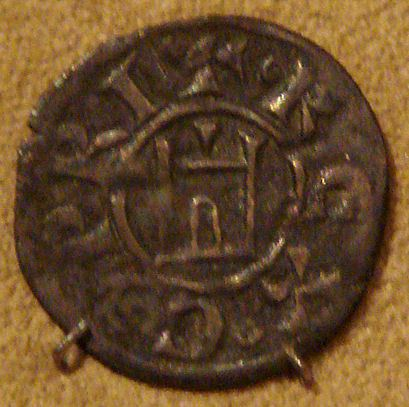
Coin of the kingdom of Cyprus, 13th century.

The economy of Cyprus remained primarily agrarian during the Lusignan period. Simultaneously, though, the island grew in importance in the trade network connecting Western Europe and the Middle East, serving as an entrepôt. This led to an increase in demand on Cypriot products (largely sugar, but also wine, wheat, oil and carobs) abroad, and the agrarian economy became more export-oriented. This allowed Cyprus to become more prosperous relative to the Byzantine period, fuelling the development of the harbour of Famagusta and the capital Nicosia, enabling the construction of architectural works that survive to this day. Whilst the development of these two eclipsed other settlements, towns such as Limassol, Paphos and Kyrenia did take some part in the changing economic environment. Limassol, in particular, became a port for the export of agricultural products and served as a stopover for Christian pilgrims to the Holy Land. The relative prosperity encouraged migration to Cyprus from the West (Genoa, Venice, Provence, Catalonia) and the East. The Latin immigrants participated in the economic life as merchants, artisans, shipwrights, ship captains and tavern keepers, and as such had an oversized share in the economy.

During this period, new industries also emerged in Cyprus. Cypriot pottery developed particular characteristics, and was exported to the Crusader States until the Fall of Acre in 1291. In the late 13th and early 14th industries, the textile industry developed, with new textile dyeing workshops being set up in Nicosia, and Cypriot samites and camlets having increasing demand in the West and the East. Famagusta became a hub for shipbuilding. These developments prompted the arrival of representatives from Florentine banking houses, such as the Peruzzi and the Bardi family. The growth of the industry as well as the labour-intensive production of sugar and wine resulted in a demand for slaves, and slave markets existed in Nicosia and Famagusta.

== Society and culture ==
Cypriot society in the Lusignan period was multi-ethnic, with Orthodox Greek Cypriots making up the majority of the population. Greeks constituted the majority of the population in the rural areas, where they were either serfs (paroikoi) or free tenants (francomati). The population increased until the middle of the fourteenth century, but the Black Death in 1347 and 1348 resulted in the loss of one fifth to one third of the population. Repeated outbreaks prevented population recovery into the fifteenth century. In the 14th century it was common for Cypriot nobility to receive their education in Constantinople.

Cyprus during this period had a vibrant court culture, in which popular pastimes were practised in a similar fashion to other European Christian societies. Music, poetry and other arts were enjoyed by both the aristocracy and middle ranks of society, as well as pursuits such as hunting.

The Roman Catholic Latins never exceeded a quarter of the island's population and were concentrated in the cities. Frankish knights and aristocracy mostly lived in Nicosia, whilst Italians were concentrated in Famagusta. The losses suffered by the Crusader States in the 1270s and 1280s and the final Fall of Acre in 1291 triggered an influx of Latin immigrants from the Levant, as Italian, Aragonese and Provençal trading cities relocated their merchants to Cyprus. Maronites, Armenians and Syrians were concentrated in the foothills of Pentadaktylos and coastal plains. There was a system of ethnic discrimination and social stratification in place. However, with the majority of the population being Greeks, the Frankish nobility set up a system that would accommodate a certain degree of Greek autonomy, for instance maintaining Greek ecclesiastical courts open to the consultation of "wise and prominent men", thus practically forming secular Greek forms that exercised a form of judicial autonomy. The Greek Cypriot dialect was used as the lingua franca on the island and legal texts were translated into the vernacular, like the Assizes of Jerusalem. This relative autonomy meant that there were no rebellions of ethnic character in the Lusignan period. Whilst Greek historiography has traditionally seen a peasant revolt in 1426–1427 as a nationalistic uprising, this was an unsystematic series of riots of pillaging by segments of the Greek peasant population and Spanish mercenaries following the Mamluk invasion, the capture of King Janus and the political vacuum that ensued.

== List of monarchs of Cyprus ==
| Picture | Name | Lifespan | Reign Start | Reign End | Notes | Regent(s) |
|---|---|---|---|---|---|---|
| | Guy | c. 1150 – 18 July 1194 (aged 43–44) | 1192 | 18 July 1194 | Son of Hugh VIII of Lusignan. | |
| | Aimery | c. 1153 – 1 April 1205 (aged 51–52) | 18 July 1194 | 1 April 1205 | Son of Hugh VIII of Lusignan. | |
| | Hugh I | 1194/1195 – 10 January 1218 (aged 22–23) | 1 April 1205 | 10 January 1218 | Son of Aimery. | Walter of Montbéliard (1205–1210) |
| | Henry I Henry the Fat | 3 May 1217 – 18 January 1253 (aged 35) | 10 January 1218 | 18 January 1253 | Son of Hugh I. | |
| | Hugh II | 1252/1253–1267 (aged 14) | 18 January 1253 | December 1267 | Son of Henry I. | Plaisance of Antioch (1253–1261); Hugh of Antioch-Lusignan (1261–1267) |
| | Hugh III; Hugh the Great | c. 1235 – 24 March 1284 (aged 48–49) | December 1267 | 24 March 1284 | Son of Henry of Antioch. Nephew of Henry I. | |
| | John I | c. 1268 – 20 May 1285 (aged 17) | 24 March 1284 | 20 May 1285 | Son of Hugh III. | |
| | Henry II | June 1270 – 31 March 1324 (aged 53) | 20 May 1285 | 31 March 1324 | Son of Hugh III. | Amalric (1306–1310) |
| | Hugh IV | c. 1295 – 24 November 1358 (aged 62–63) | 31 March 1324 | 24 November 1358 | Son of Guy of Poitiers-Lusignan. Nephew of Henry II. | |
| | Peter I | 9 October 1328 – 17 January 1369 (aged 40) | 24 November 1358 | 17 January 1369 | Son of Hugh IV. | |
| | Peter II; Peter the Fat | c. 1354 or 1357 – 13 October 1382 (aged 24–27) | 17 January 1369 | 13 October 1382 | Son of Peter I. | |
| | James I | 1334 – 9 September 1398 (aged 63–64) | 13 October 1382 | 9 September 1398 | Son of Hugh IV. | |
| | Janus | 1375 – 29 June 1432 (aged 56–57) | 9 September 1398 | 29 June 1432 | Son of James I. | |
| | John II | 16 May 1418 – 28 July 1458 (aged 40) | 29 June 1432 | 28 July 1458 | Son of Janus. | |
| | Charlotte | 28 June 1444 – 16 July 1487 (aged 43) | 28 July 1458 | 1464 | Daughter of John II. Co-ruler with her husband Louis (1459–1464). | |
| | Louis | June 1436 – April 1482 (aged 45) | 7 October 1459 | 1464 | Son of Louis, Duke of Savoy. Co-ruler with his wife Charlotte. | |
| | James II | c. 1438/1439 – 10 July 1473 (aged 34–36) | 1464 | 10 July 1473 | Illegitimate son of John II. | |
| | James III | 6 August 1473 – 26 August 1474 (aged 1) | 6 August 1473 | 26 August 1474 | Son of James II and Catherine Cornaro. | Catherine Cornaro |
| | Catherine | 25 November 1454 – 10 July 1510 (aged 55) | 26 August 1474 | 26 February 1489 | Daughter of Marco Cornaro. Wife of James II and mother of James III. | |

== Pretenders of the Kingdom of Cyprus ==
- Thierry of Flanders, who married the "damsel of Cyprus", heiress of Isaac Komnenos, in the winter of 1202/1203, claimed the kingdom, but Aimery refused to surrender it.
- Eugene Matteo de Armenia (1480s–1523), said by his own progeny to have been an illegitimate son of King James II of Cyprus and if born in the 1480s he was quite a posthumous specimen, alleged to have moved to Sicily then Malta, founder of the family of Baron di Baccari (Tal-Baqqar).
- Charlotte (d. 1487) and Louis (d. 1482), queen and king-consort, continued as pretenders, Charlotte renounced 1482 in favour of:
- Charles I of Savoy (1482–1490), legitimate great-grandson of Janus of Cyprus, son of a first cousin of Charlotte, second cousin of James III, nephew of Louis
- Charles II of Savoy (1490–1496)
- Yolande Louise of Savoy (1496–1499) and Philibert II of Savoy (d. 1504)
  - Philip II of Savoy (1496–1497), father of Philibert II, great-uncle of Charles II and of Yolande Louise, first cousin of Charlotte, maternal grandson of Janus of Cyprus.
- and several others. The rights diverted de jure, but were claimed by the male line. See further under Cypriot claimants under Kings of Jerusalem.

By 1476, the various claims were so diverse and weak that various monarchs sought former Cypriot queens to cede them their rights. Even the Republic of Venice briefly entertained the idea of setting up Anthony Woodville, 2nd Earl Rivers, the brother-in-law of England's King Edward IV (who was secretly negotiating a marriage to the Scottish princess Cecilia on Anthony's behalf), as a claimant by purchasing the rights of former Cypriot queens Charlotte and Catarina Cornaro. A convention in Venice of 1476 declared "Anthony Arnite" heir to the combined kingdom of Jerusalem-Cyprus but this came to nought when Anthony died before even his marriage to the sister of James Stewart, King of Scots could be celebrated, and the former Cypriot queens ceded their rights elsewhere: Charlotte to the Italian house of Savoy and Catarina Cornaro to the Most Serene Republic of Venice which asserted its claim to the kingdom as part of the republic, without even a candidate for king.

- In 1880, former Maronite priest Kalfa Narbei declared that he was a descendant of Guy de Lusignan and styled himself as the Prince of Lusignan of Cyprus, of Jerusalem and of Armenia. He took the name Guy de Lusignan and title of Prince. He started offering self-styled chivalric orders. After the death of Guy/Kalfa Narbei in 1905, his wife Marie's lover became the alleged Grand Master and called himself Comte d'Alby de Gratigny. He became involved in a fake art scandal in 1910.

== Titles of the Kings of Cyprus ==
- King of Cyprus
- King of Jerusalem
- King of Armenia (Cilicia)
- Lord of the Mountains

== Coat of arms ==
Coat of arms of Lusignans as the Kings of Cyprus.

Lusignans as the Kings of Cyprus and Jerusalem.

Lusignans as the Kings of Cyprus, Jerusalem and Armenia (since 1393).

== See also ==
- Grand Officers of the Kingdom of Cyprus
- Mamluk campaign against Cyprus (disambiguation)
