= Louis, King of Cyprus =

King of Cyprus from 1459 to 1464

Louis

King of Cyprus
- Reign: 1459–1464
- Predecessor: Charlotte
- Successor: James II
- Co-ruler: Charlotte
- Contender: James II (from 1460)

Count of Geneva
- Reign: 1460–1482
- Born: June 1436; Geneva
- Died: April 1482 (aged 45); Priory of Ripaille
- Spouses: Annabella of Scotland; Charlotte, Queen of Cyprus
- House: Savoy
- Father: Louis, Duke of Savoy
- Mother: Anne of Lusignan

Louis of Savoy (Italian: Ludovico; 1436–37; April 1482) was King of Cyprus from 1459 to 1464 as the husband and co-ruler of Queen Charlotte. He was also Count of Geneva from 1460 to 1482. He was the second son of Louis, Duke of Savoy, and his wife, Anne of Lusignan, daughter of King Janus of Cyprus.

== Life ==
Louis was born, according to Samuel Guichenon, in June 1431, in Geneva, but the historian specifies in note that he was born in 1436. A birth date of June 1436 is therefore been adopted by contemporary authors. Guichenon also specifies that the prince is 8 years old when he married in 1444. Some mention a period between 1436 and 1437, especially for this last year argues the Swiss historian Édouard Mallet (1805–1856).

On 14 December 1444, at Stirling Castle, he married Annabella, youngest daughter of King James I of Scotland (died 1437) and sister of King James II of Scotland. (Note: According to George Hill, upon Annabella's arrival in Savoy, Charles VII of France opposed the marriage and the arrangement was broken on 3 March 1455. This was accepted by James II of Scotland on 7 May 1456.) The official wedding never took place and the marriage was annulled in 1458.

On 7 October 1458, his cousin Charlotte became Queen of Cyprus. He married her on 7 October 1459 and became King of Cyprus as well as the titular king of Jerusalem and the Armenian Kingdom of Cilicia. Their reign ended when they were deposed.

Louis died in April 1482, at the priory of Ripaille.

== Sources ==
- Hill, George (1948). A History of Cyprus. Vol. III: The Frankish Period, 1432–1571. Cambridge University Press.
- Ward, A.W.; Prothero, G.W.; Leathes, Stanley, eds. (1911). The Cambridge Modern History. Vol. XIII. Cambridge University Press.

Regnal titles
Preceded by Charlotte as sole ruler	King of Cyprus; 1458–1464 with Charlotte of Cyprus	Succeeded by James II
