= Liana Cheney =

Art historian (born 1942)

Liana De Girolami Cheney (born 1942) is an art historian, administrator, author, curator, and educator. She is the Founder of the Society of Renaissance Art History.

== Early life and education ==
Cheney was born in Milan, Italy. She has a B.S. and an M.A. from the University of Miami. She earned her Ph.D. from Boston University. Cheney is known for her work presenting women artists, especially in the Boston area.

Cheney taught virtually for the Beacon Hill Seminar (BHS) in Boston on art seminars about ancient Roman culture, Italian Renaissance paintings, American landscape paintings, Pre-Raphaelite artists, and Women's self-portraits before retiring to Florida in 2020.

As of 2024 Cheney is the president of the Association for Textual Scholarship of Art History.

== Publications ==
- Cheney, Liana; Hendrix, John Shannon (2004). Neoplatonic Aesthetics. New York: Peter Lang Incorporated, International Academic Publishers. ISBN 978-0-8204-7111-2.
- Girolami, Liana De (2021). Edward Burne-Jones on Nature. Newcastle upon Tyne: Cambridge Scholars Publishing. ISBN 978-1-5275-6904-1.
- Cheney, Liana (2003). Essays on Women Artists. Lewiston: Mellen. ISBN 978-0-7734-6818-4.
- Cheney, Liana; Faxon, Alicia Craig; Russo, Kathleen Lucey (2009). Self-portraits by Women Painters. Washington, DC: New Academia Publishing, LLC. ISBN 978-0-9823867-3-6. OCLC 494691392.
