= James II of Cyprus =

15th-century King of Cyprus

James II
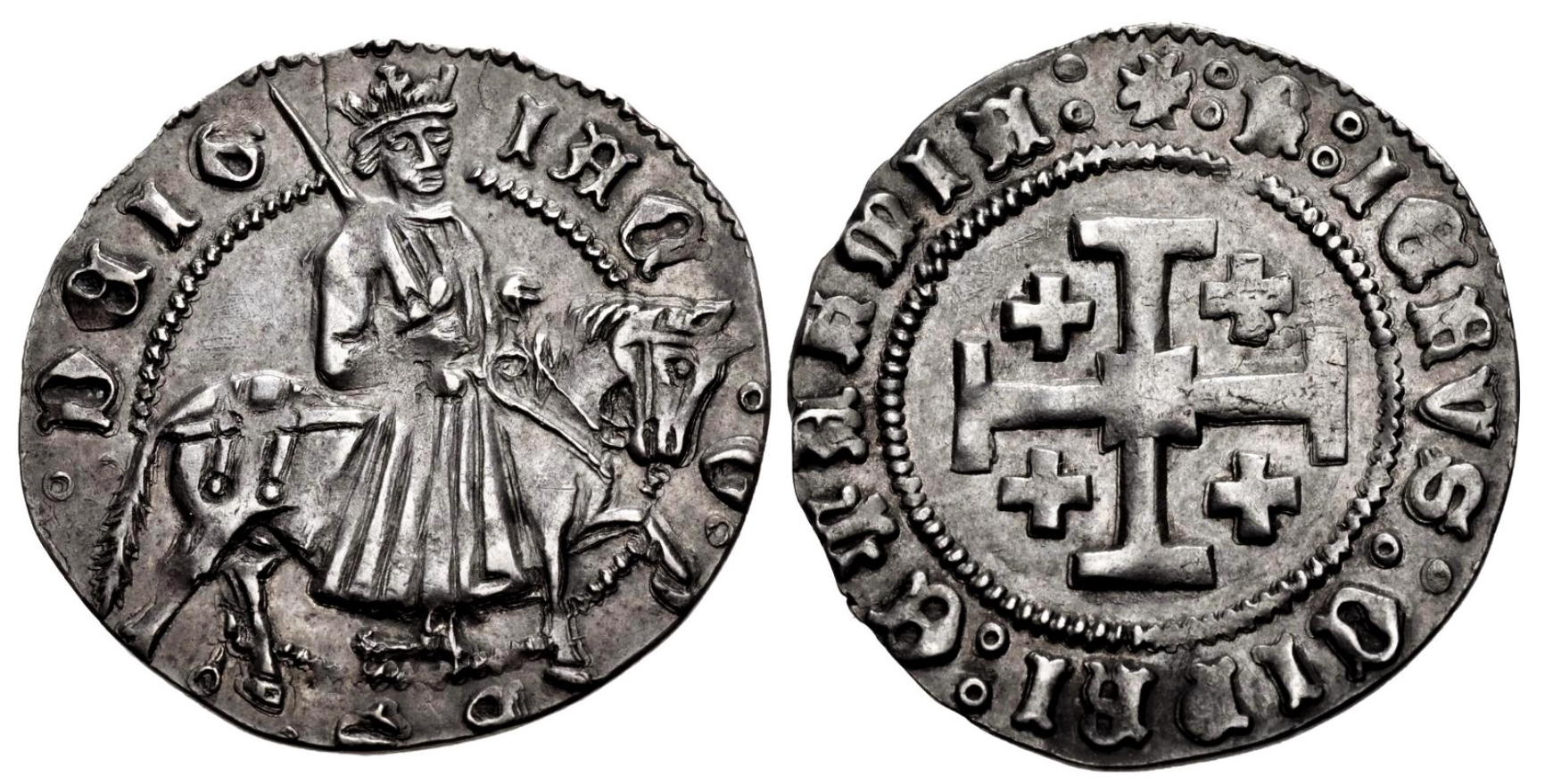
- Coin depicting James II of Cyprus

King of Cyprus
- Reign: 1460/1464 – 10 July 1473
- Predecessor: Charlotte and Louis
- Successor: James III
- Contenders: Charlotte and Louis (1460–1464)
- Born: c. 1438/1439 or c. 1440
- Died: 10 July 1473
- Spouse: Catherine Cornaro
- Issue: James III of Cyprus
- House: Poitiers-Lusignan
- Father: John II of Cyprus
- Mother: Marietta de Patras (concubine)

James II (French: Jacques; c. 1438/1439 or c. 1440 – 10 July 1473) was the penultimate King of Cyprus, reigning from 1460/1464 until his death.

== Archbishop of Nicosia ==
James was born in Nicosia as the illegitimate son of John II of Cyprus and Marietta de Patras. He was a favourite of his father, and in 1456, at the age of 16, he was appointed to the archbishopric of Nicosia. After murdering Iacopo Urri, the royal chamberlain, on 1 April 1457, he was deprived of the archbishopric and fled to Rhodes on a ship of the Catalan Juan Tafures. He was pardoned by his father, and the archbishopric was returned to him.

== King of Cyprus ==
In 1458, his father died and his half-sister Charlotte became Queen of Cyprus. Then in 1460, with support from the Egyptian Mamluk sultan Sayf al-Din Inal, James challenged her right to the throne, blockading her and her husband, Louis of Savoy, in the castle of Kyrenia for three years. Charlotte fled to Rome in 1463.

With the fall of Kyrenia before the autumn of 1464, Charlotte and Louis de facto lost their throne. James was crowned king in her stead. In gratitude, he made his friend and supporter Juan Tafures Master of his Household and titular Count of Tripoli.

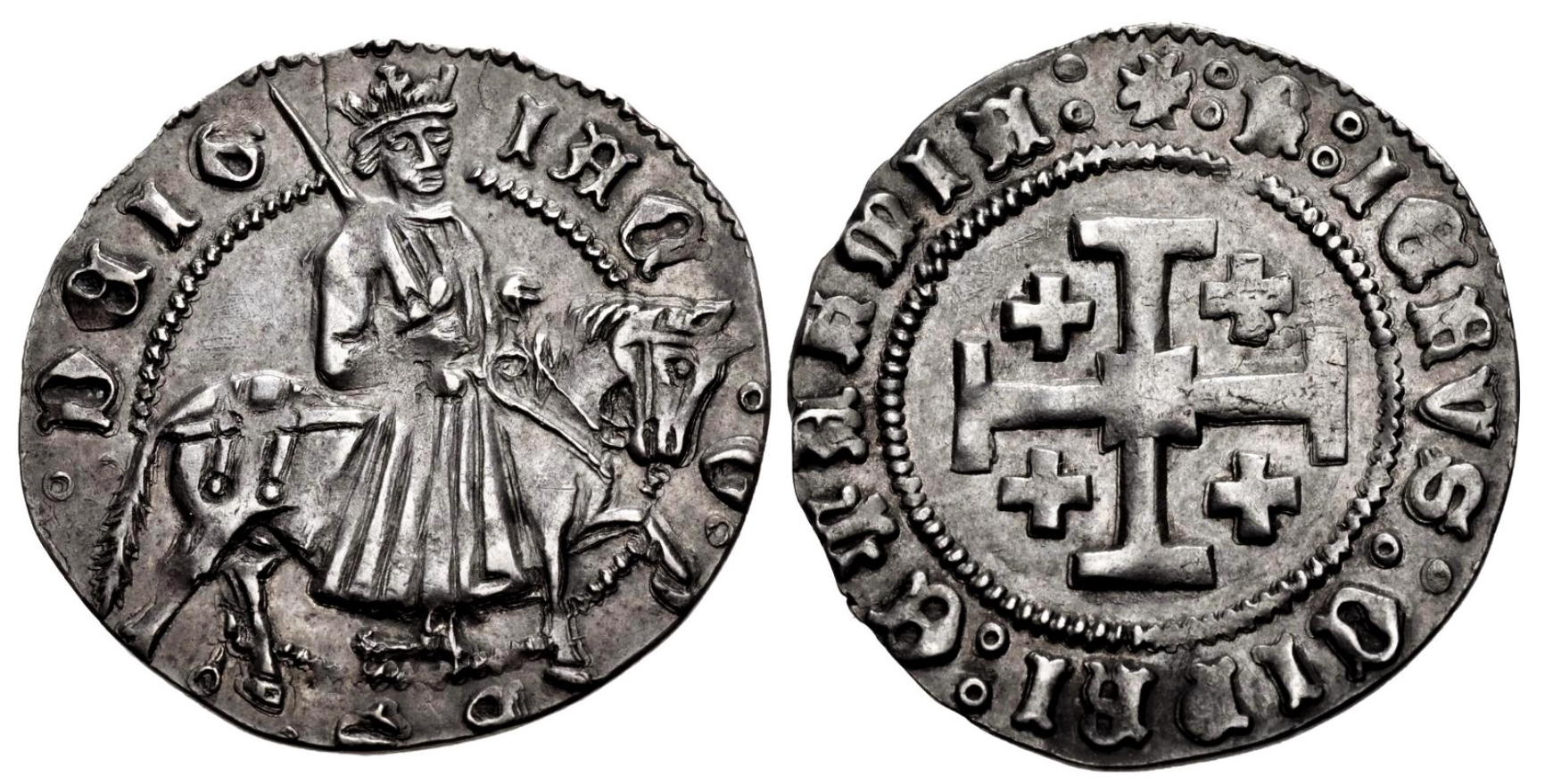
Silver coin of James II of Cyprus showing him on horseback on one side and Jerusalem Cross on reverse. Legends: IACOBS DEI G / R IERUS CIPRI ET ARMIA

== Marriage, death and succession ==
In Venice, on 30 July 1468, seeking political support, he married a 14-year-old Venetian, Catherine Cornaro, by proxy. She sailed to Cyprus in 1472 and they married in person at Famagusta in October or November. James died in Famagusta a few months later amidst some suspicion that he might have been poisoned by agents of Venice, possibly by Catherine's uncles. According to his will, Catherine, who was pregnant, became regent. The couple's son, James III, died under suspicious circumstances in 1474 before his first birthday, leaving Catherine as queen regnant of Cyprus. During her reign, the island was controlled by Venetian merchants. In 1489, Venice forced her to abdicate, and Cyprus became a colony of the Republic of Venice.

== Illegitimate children ==
Prior to his marriage, James II had three natural children with a mistress:

- Eugene of Lusignan (c. 1468 – 1536, Venice), married Donna Paola Mazzara of Sicily after 1509.
- Janus of Lusignan (died after 1552), married first in 1504 to N de Toro, married second, in 1547 to Virginia Cosanza dei Duchi di San Sava, with issue.
- Charlotte of Lusignan (April 1468 – 24 July 1480, Castel of Padua), she was either married or engaged to the designated heir of her aunt, Alonso, batard d'Aragona (1460–1510), a son of Ferdinand I of Naples. She was imprisoned by Queen Charlotte's opponents and died in captivity shortly before her twelfth birthday.

He had another mistress, by the name of Eschive de Nores (died after 1468), who married his cousin, Philippe, titular Prince of Galilee, a son of his great-uncle, Henry.

== Sources ==
- De Girolami Cheney, Liana (2013). "Caterina Cornaro, Queen of Cyprus". In Barrett-Graves, Debra (ed.). The Emblematic Queen Extra-Literary Representations of Early Modern Queenship. Palgrave Macmillan.
- Hill, George (1948). A History of Cyprus. Vol. The Frankish Period, 1432–1571. Cambridge University Press.
- Letts, Malcolm (2016). The Pilgrimage of Arnold von Harff, Knight, from Cologne, 1496-1499. Routledge.

Regnal titles
Preceded by Charlotte; Louis	King of Cyprus; 1460/1464–1473	Vacant Title next held by James III
