= John II of Cyprus =

King of Cyprus from 1432 to 1458

John II
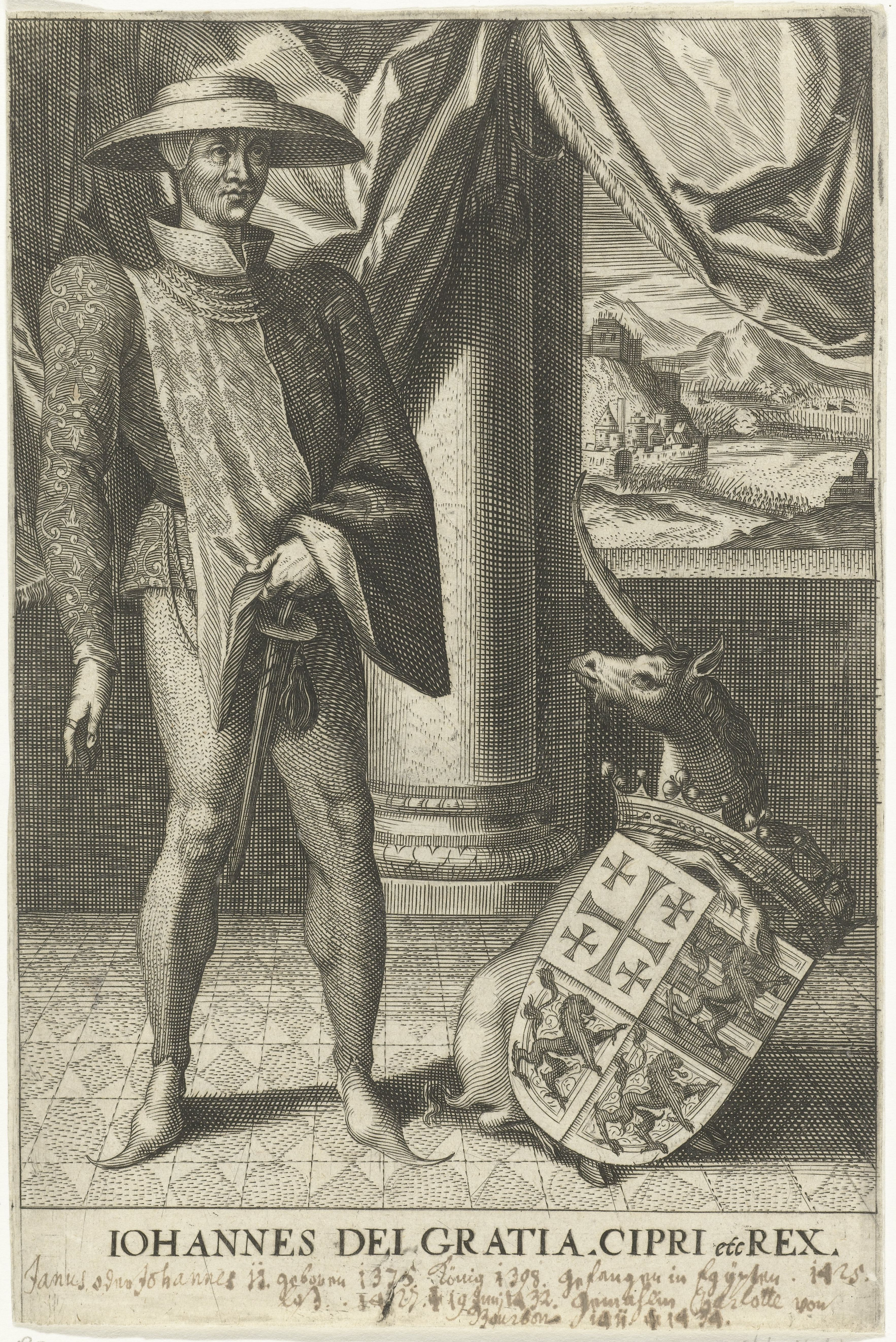
- Drawing of John, c. 1550 - 1600

King of Cyprus
- Reign: 29 June 1432 – 28 July 1458
- Predecessor: Janus
- Successor: Charlotte
- Born: 16 May 1418
- Died: 28 July 1458 (aged 40)
- Spouse: Amadea Palaiologina of Montferrat; Helena Palaiologina
- Issue: King James II (illegitimate); Queen Charlotte; Princess Cleopha
- House: Poitiers-Lusignan
- Father: Janus, King of Cyprus
- Mother: Charlotte of Bourbon

John II or III of Cyprus (16 May 1418 – 28 July 1458) was the King of Cyprus and Armenia and also titular King of Jerusalem from 1432 to 1458. He was previously a titular Prince of Antioch.

== Biography ==
Born 16 May 1418 in Nicosia, John was the son of king Janus of Cyprus and Charlotte of Bourbon. In May, sometime between 1435 and 1440, he married Amadea Palaiologina of Monferrato, daughter of John Jacob Palaiologos, Marquess of Montferrat. They had no children. His second wife, a distant relative of his first, was Helena Palaiologina, only child and daughter of Theodore II Palaiologos, Despot of the Morea, and Cleofa Malatesta.

During his rule, Corycus, the only Cypriot stronghold in mainland Anatolia, was lost to the Karamanids in 1448.

John appointed his illegitimate son James, Archbishop of Nicosia at age 16. James was stripped of his title after murdering the royal chamberlain. His father eventually forgave him and restored him to the archbishopric. James and Helena were enemies, vying for influence over John.

After Helena died in 1458, it appeared that John would appoint James as his successor, but John died on 28 July 1458 before he could make it so and was succeeded by his daughter Charlotte succeeded to the throne.

== Issue ==
By his marriage to Helena Palaiologina he had:

- Charlotte, Queen of Cyprus, married Prince John of Antioch. She died childless
- Cleopha of Lusignan, died young

John had an illegitimate son by Marietta de Patras:

- James II, King of Cyprus

coat-of-arms of Lusignan of Cyprus, Jerusalem and Lesser Armenia

== Sources ==
- Boustronios, Georgios (2005). A Narrative of the Chronicle of Cyprus: 1456-1489. State University of New York Press.
- Letts, Malcolm, ed. (2017). The Pilgrimage of Arnold Von Harff, Knight, from Cologne: Through Italy, Syria, Egypt, Arabia, Ethiopia, Nubia, Palestine, Turkey, France and Spain, which He Accomplished in the Years 1496-1499. Taylor & Francis.
- Murray, Alan V., ed. (2006). The Crusades: An Encyclopedia. Vol. 2. ABC-CLIO.
- Samson, Jim; Demetriou, Nicoletta, eds. (2015). Music in Cyprus. Ashgate Publishing Limited.

Regnal titles
Preceded by Janus	King of Cyprus; 1432–1458	Succeeded by Charlotte
Preceded by Janus	— TITULAR — King of Jerusalem; King of Armenian Cilicia; 1432–1458	Succeeded by Charlotte
