= Charlotte, Queen of Cyprus =

Queen of Cyprus from 1458 to 1464

Charlotte
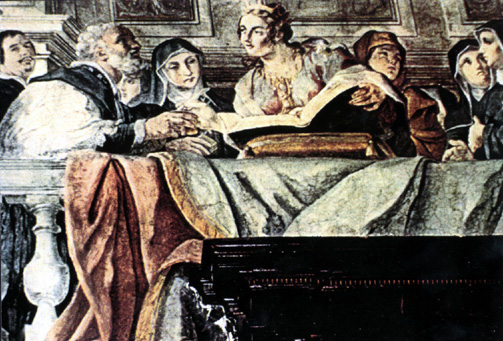
- Charlotte in the centre with the open book

Queen of Cyprus
- Reign: 28 July 1458 – 1464
- Coronation: 7 October 1458; St. Sophia Cathedral
- Predecessor: John II
- Successor: James II
- Co-ruler: Louis (from 1459)
- Contender: James II (from 1460)
- Born: 28 June 1444; Nicosia, Cyprus
- Died: 16 July 1487 (aged 43); Rome, Italy
- Spouses: John of Coimbra (m. 1456; died 1457) Louis of Savoy (m. 1459; died 1482)
- House: Poitiers-Lusignan
- Father: John II of Cyprus
- Mother: Helena Palaiologina

Charlotte (28 June 1444 – 16 July 1487) was the Queen of Cyprus from 1458 until 1464. She was the eldest and only surviving daughter of King John II of Cyprus and Helena Palaiologina. At the age of 14, she succeeded to the Cypriot throne upon the death of her father. Her illegitimate half-brother, James, challenged her right to the crown. With the support of the Egyptians, he forced her to flee the island in 1463, and he was later crowned king. She made a military attempt to regain her throne, but was unsuccessful, and died childless in Rome.

== Family and childhood ==
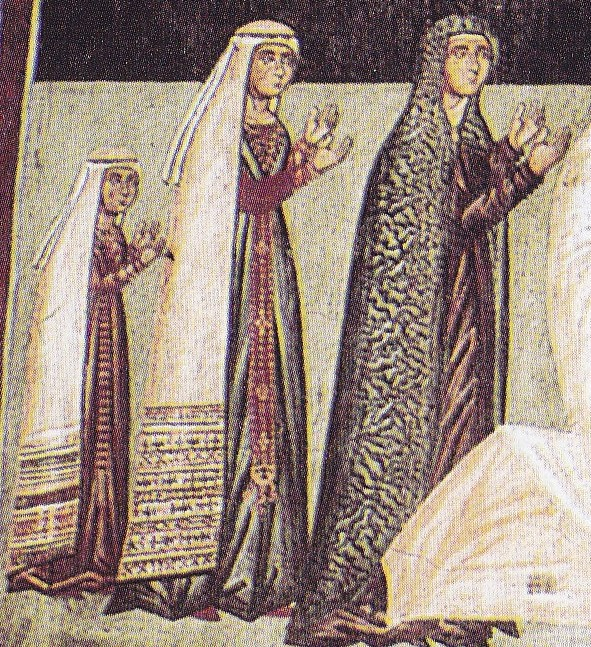
Family of Vasilios Hamados, detail from Arhangelos Michael church at Pedoulas

Charlotte was born in Nicosia on 28 June 1444, the eldest and only surviving daughter of King John II of Cyprus and Helena Palaiologina. Her younger sister Cleopha died in June 1448, shortly before Charlotte's fourth birthday, leaving her the sole legitimate heir to the Cypriot throne and her father's titles. She had an illegitimate half-brother, James, born to her father's Greek mistress Marietta de Patras.

She was raised in the Byzantine tradition and spoke fluent Greek, which she learned from her mother. She could write French, Italian, and possibly Latin, but throughout her life spoke mainly Greek. Due to her outspoken manner, Pope Pius II called her the "Greek torrent".

== Queen of Cyprus ==
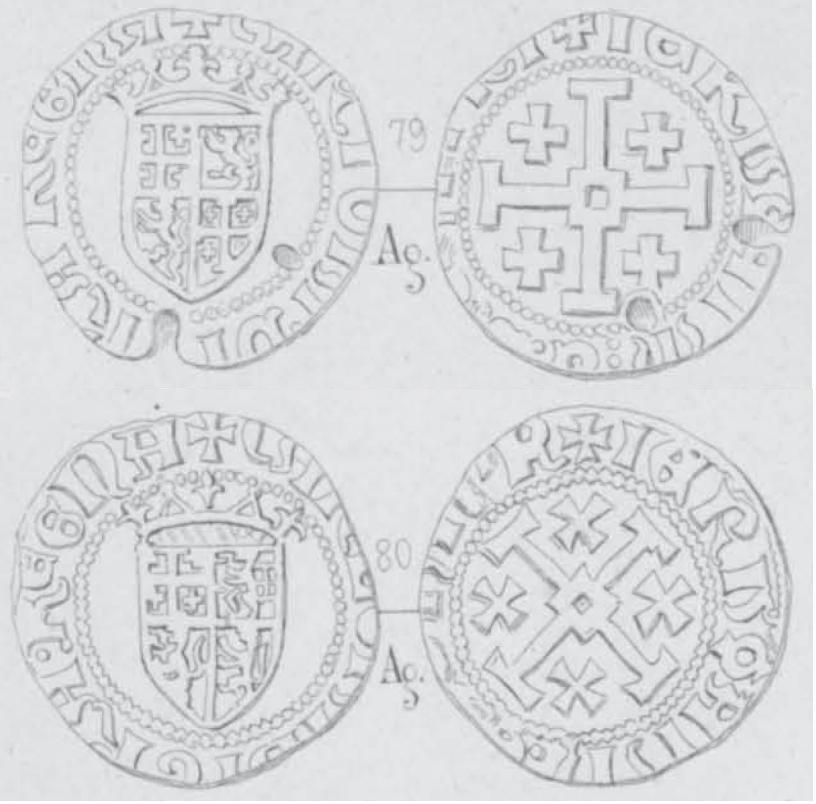
Silver gros coins of Charlotte. Issued 1458–1460, Cyprus. Obverse: Crowned shield with Lusignan coat of arms, CARLOTA DI GRA REGNA. Reverse: Cross of Jerusalem, IERVZALM E D CHIPR. Diameter 25 mm, Weight 3.96 gr (69.5 Enetian grains).

Charlotte was named Princess of Antioch in 1456. The same year she married her first husband, John of Portugal. The marriage might have been intitiated by John's aunt Isabella of Portugal, Duchess of Burgundy, to acquire a naval base in the Mediterannean for safe passage of bands of Burgundian Crusaders into the Holy Land.

Charlotte's husband tried to counterbalance the Greek Orthodox influence of his mother-in-law, Helena Palaiologina. But after a time the relationship between John and Helena became so strained that he and Charlotte moved to the home of Peter of Lusignan.

After a short illness (allegedly due to poisoning by Helena), he died in 1457 and was buried in the Church of St. Francis in Nicosia.

Now a young widow, Charlotte's loss was followed the next year by the death of her father on 28 July 1458 . At the age of fourteen Charlotte thus became Queen of Cyprus and was crowned at St. Sophia Cathedral on 7 October 1458.

Charlotte had a tenuous hold on the kingdom, as her right to the throne was constantly being challenged by her illegitimate half-brother James. On 7 October 1459, she married her second husband, Louis of Savoy, Count of Geneva. This marriage had been arranged by the Genoese, who promised their assistance in retaining her crown against the claims of James.

In 1460 James captured Famagusta and Nicosia with aid from the Egyptian sultanate of Sayf ad-Din Inal. In 1463, after being blockaded in the castle of Kyrenia for three years, she and Louis fled to Rome.

With the fall of Kyrenia before the autumn of 1464, Charlotte and Louis de facto lost their throne. Her half-brother was crowned King James II. She took up residence at the Convertendi Palace in Trastevere. Pope Pius II, who was acquainted with her described Charlotte as "a woman of about twenty-four, of middle height: bright eyes, complexion betwixt dark and pale; speech smooth and flowing torrent like after the manner of the Greeks; French costume; manners becoming her royal blood".

She later formed a small court on the Greek island of Rhodes. She made an unsuccessful military attempt to regain her throne with papal support. She also intrigued against James's widow, Catherine Cornaro, but failed to oust her from power. In November 1483 she was received by Pope Sixtus IV in the Vatican Palace and was seated in a chair of the same "height and dignity" as the pope. In Rome, she lived in a house in Piazza Scossacavalli in Borgo which had already hosted queen Catherine of Bosnia.

== Succession and death ==
She had adopted as her son, Alonso d'Aragona (1460–1510), the illegitimate child of King Ferdinand I of Naples, who was either married or engaged to her half-brother's illegitimate daughter, Charla de Lusignan (born 24 July 1468).

Charlotte had intended to maintain the continuity of the dynasty through her niece, and in c. 1473, accompanied by Alonso, she visited Sultan Al-Asraf Khalil in Cairo to discuss a possible restoration to the throne. Al-Asraf supported Charlotte's cause, but the plan could not be carried out until she had custody of young Charla.

The former queen's opponents ensured this would never happen by imprisoning the girl in Padua; she died there before her twelfth birthday in 1480. Afterwards, a marriage was suggested between Alonso and Catherine Conaro, but this also failed due to the interference of the Republic of Venice. Instead, around February 1485, in exchange for an annual pension of 4,300 florins, Charlotte ceded her claims to her cousin's son, Charles I of Savoy, the next in the legitimate line of succession.

Charlotte died on 16 July 1487, shortly after her forty-third birthday. Her body was buried in the chapel of Saint Andrew and Saint Gregory, St. Peter's Basilica; the funeral was paid for by Pope Innocent VIII. She was the last member of the House of Poitiers-Lusignan as her only son and heir Hugh died not long after birth.

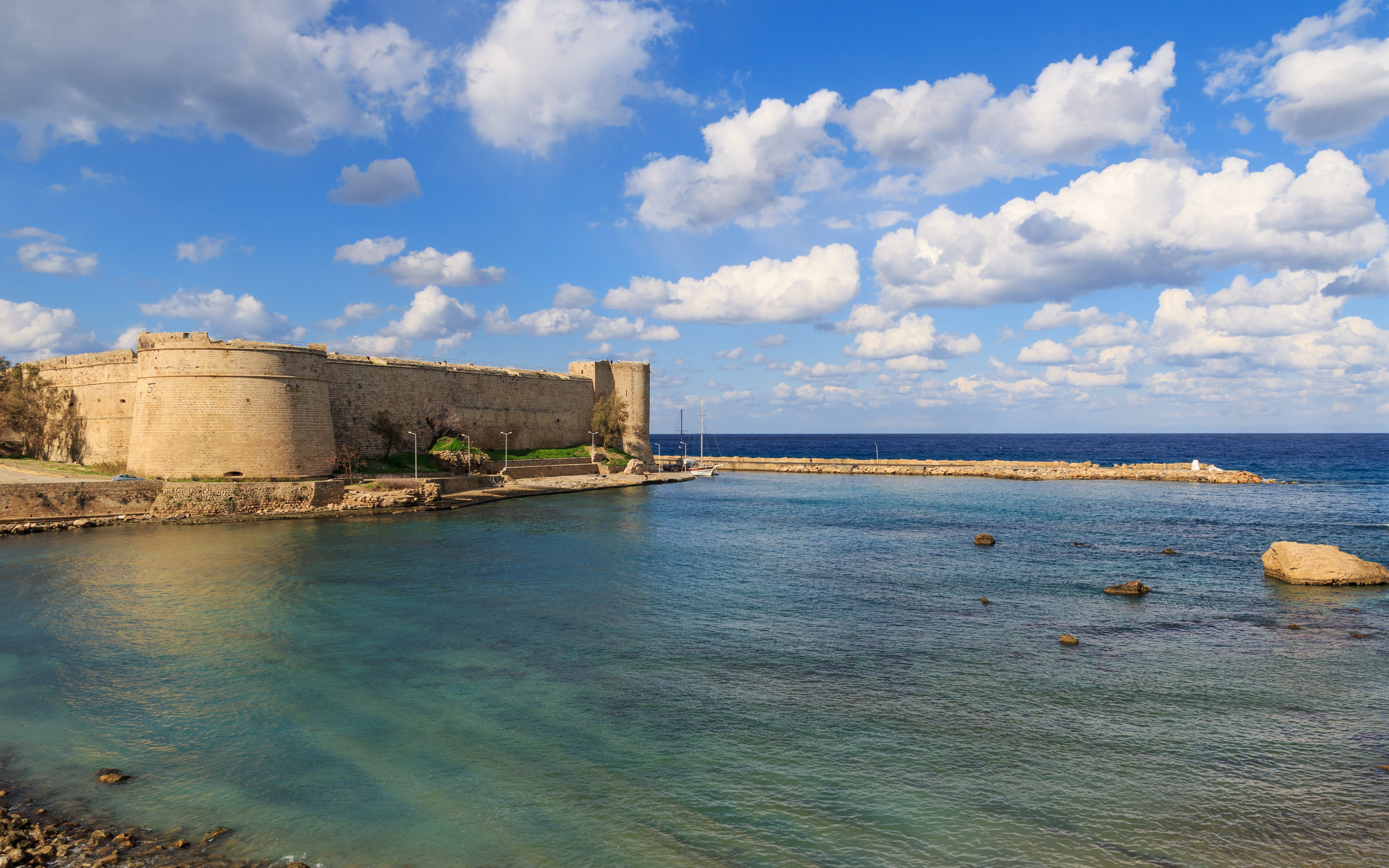
Kyrenia Castle in Cyprus, where Charlotte was blockaded for three years

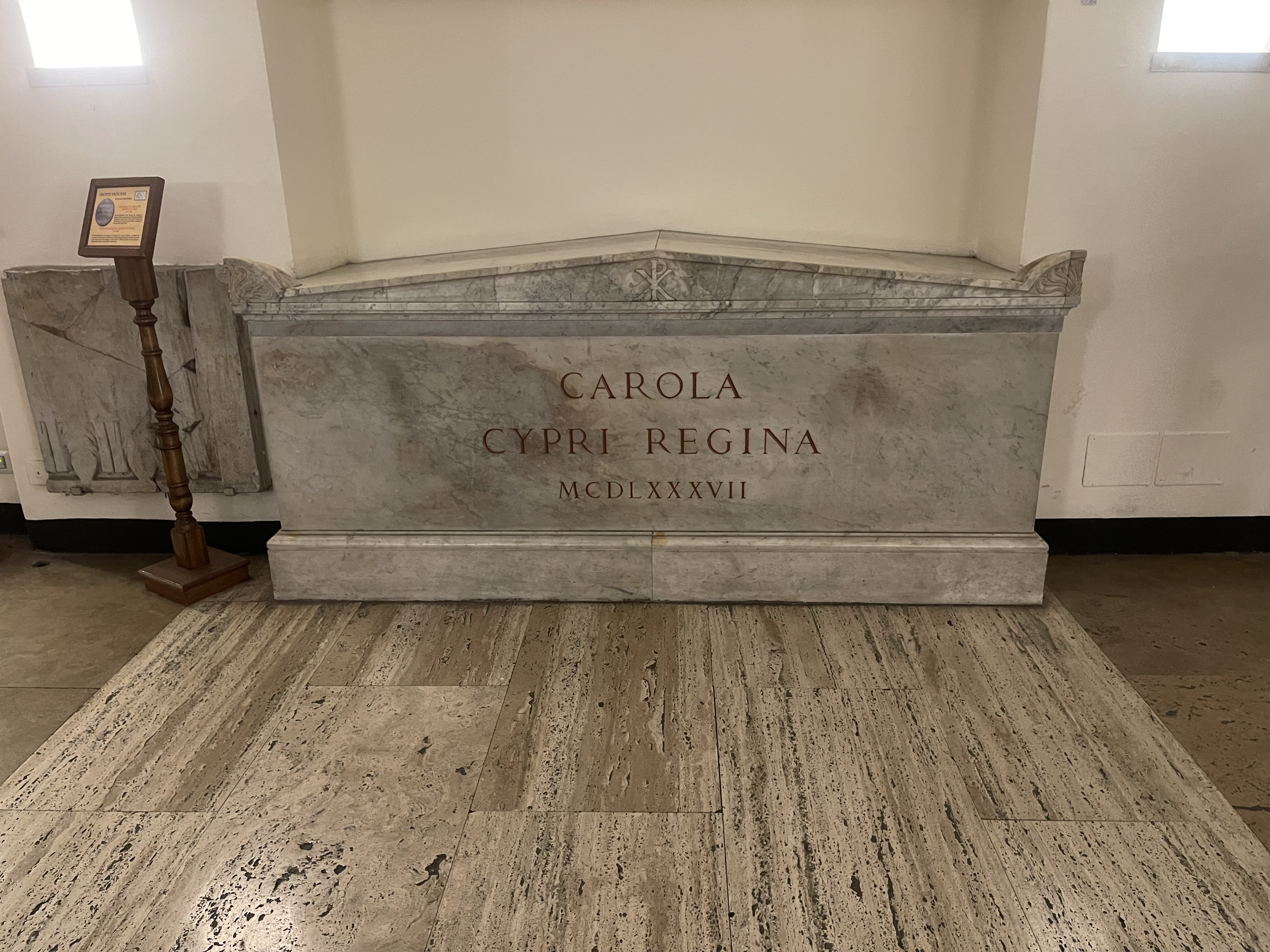
Tomb of Queen Charlotte under St. Peter's Basilica

== Marriages ==
Charlotte married twice:

1. Infante John of Portugal, also known as John of Coimbra, (1431 or 1433 – between July and 11 September 1457) (son of Infante Pedro, Duke of Coimbra and grandson of King John I of Portugal), in May 1456 in Nicosia. He was made a titular Prince of Antioch. It is rumoured that his death was a murder due to poisoning, arranged by Queen Helena, leaving Charlotte free to make a second marriage.
2. Louis of Savoy, Count of Geneva (Geneva, 5 June 1436 or 1 April 1437 – Château-Monastery de Ripaille, August 1482). The couple were married on 7 October 1459, almost a year after Charlotte's coronation. Louis was her cousin: he was the second son and namesake of Louis, Count of Savoy by Anne de Lusignan, daughter of King Janus of Cyprus, and became a King of Cyprus from 1459 to 1462 and also a titular King of Jerusalem.

By her second husband Louis, Charlotte had;

- Hugh or Henry, (Note: Ούγος (Ερρίκος) της Σαβοΐας/της Κύπρου in Greek, Hugues (Henri) de Chypre/de Savoie in French, Hugo (Henricus) Cypri/Sabaudiensis in Latin, Հուգո (Հենրիկ) Կիպրոսի in Armenian.) who was born on 4 July 1464 in Rhodes and died within a month of his birth.

== Sources ==
- Borgatti, Mariano (1926). Borgo e S. Pietro nel 1300 – 1600 – 1925 (in Italian). Federico Pustet, Roma.
- Letts, Malcolm (2016). The Pilgrimage of Arnold von Harff, Knight, from Cologne, 1496–1499. Routledge.
- Hill, George (1948). A History of Cyprus. Vol. The Frankish Period, 1432–1571. Cambridge University Press.
- Scott, John Beldon (2003). Architecture for the Shroud: Relic and Ritual in Turin. University of Chicago Press.

Regnal titles
| Preceded by John II | Queen of Cyprus; 1458–1464 with Louis (1459–1464) | Succeeded by James II |
