= Janus, King of Cyprus =

Cypriot ruler from 1398 to 1432

Janus
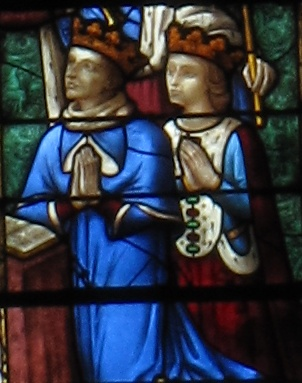
- King Janus and Queen Charlotte in Chartres cathedral

King of Cyprus
- Reign: 9 September 1398 – 29 June 1432
- Predecessor: James I
- Successor: John II
- Born: 1375; Genoa
- Died: 29 June 1432 (aged 56–57); Nicosia
- Spouse: Anglesia Visconti (1401–1407); Charlotte de Bourbon (1411–1422)
- Issue: John II, King of Cyprus; Anne, Duchess of Savoy
- House: Poitiers-Lusignan
- Father: James I of Cyprus
- Mother: Helvis of Brunswick-Grubenhagen

Janus (1375 – 29 June 1432) was King of Cyprus and titular King of Armenian Cilicia and Jerusalem from 1398 to 1432.

== Early life ==
Janus was born in Genoa, where his father, James I of Cyprus, was held captive. His mother, Helvis of Brunswick-Grubenhagen, named him in honor of the god Janus, the founder of Genoa according to mythological tradition.

When his father was elected king, he negotiated an agreement with the Genoese to release him to go to Cyprus, which he signed on 2 February 1383. Under that agreement, the Genoese were given new commercial privileges. However, the Genoese demanded that his father leave Janus in their city as a hostage. James sent a noble to Genoa, John Babin, to act as stepfather to his son. As the Cypriot historian Leontios Makhairas writes, James ordered a special tax which required the Cypriots—both nobles and commoners—to purchase an amount of salt to collect the money needed to release his son from Genoese captivity; this was achieved on October 1392, when Janus was 18 years old.

== Reign ==
After his father's death on 9 September 1398, Janus inherited the throne of Cyprus. He was crowned in Nicosia's Saint Sophia Cathedral on 11 November 1398.

=== Conflict with Genoa ===
In 1402 he tried to take back Famagusta, which was under Genoese rule. According to the writings of Amati, the administrator of Famagusta, the Genoese Antonio de Karko, was Janus's godfather. Janus conspired with a priest who was the spiritual father of de Karko, to return the city to the Cypriot kingdom, upon which the priest was to become Bishop of Famagusta. Peter Makhairas, brother of Leontios was also involved in the conspiracy. They made secret keys to the city gates and there were many preparations to take over Famagusta and to murder de Karko with the help of Brother Gregory and to open the gates for Janus's soldiers. However, at the last moment the plan was betrayed, and the conspirators were arrested at Famagusta; 28 of them were executed and the city remained in Genoese hands.

Janus continued his effort to take back Famagusta (whose territory also included Kyrenia). In 1403, the governor of Genoa, Jean Le Maingre, had talks with Janus's representative Giorgio Billi which ended in an agreement by which the cities remained under Genoese hands. Later, he forced the Cypriot people to pay special taxes to assemble an army and siege machines, and he besieged Famagusta for three years but in vain, since there was access from the sea to the city. In 1406 the siege ended and the Genoese tried to occupy Limassol, but were defeated.

Two years later, the island was affected by epidemics. Simultaneously, there were many raids of locusts on the island, which caused destruction to agriculture. A new epidemic arrived in 1419–1420, which probably caused the death of Janus's second wife, Charlotte on 15 January 1422. Because Janus was very distraught about her death, Charlotte's body was moved out of the palace where her funeral was, so it would not be seen by Janus.

=== Mamluk war ===
After raids around the Cypriot coasts –because Cyprus was still a permanent base for Christian pirates– Janus had repeated discussions with the Sultan of Egypt via the Sultan's representatives. Janus was unable to stop the raids, which gave the Muslims a reason to retaliate against Cyprus. Cypriot nobles and officials of the kingdom participated in the raids.

Barsbay, the Mamluk sultan of Egypt, sent military forces to Cyprus several times during the reign of Janus. A small force attacked Limassol around 1424, and in 1425 the Egyptian army attacked Famagusta and then pillaged Larnaca together with the nearby area, including Kiti, Dromolaxia, Kellia, Aradippou and Agrinou. After Larnaca, they went to Limassol, which was also sacked, including the city's castle.

In the summer of 1426, the Egyptian Mamluks launched a large-scale attack against the island. Led by Atallah Muhammad and Inal al-Kakimi, their army contained over 3,000 men and included Mamluks, Circassians, Kurds and Arabs and arrived at the island with 180 ships near Avdimou. Limassol was again occupied. Janus mustered his army and moved from Nicosia to Limassol. He asked in vain for help from the Christian forces in Europe: the Genoese were his enemies, and the Venetians and others did not want to destroy commercial relations with the Egyptian sultan.

Following the Battle of Chirokitia (7 July 1426) against the Mamluks, King Janus was captured by the Egyptian forces. He was ransomed after ten months of captivity in Cairo. During his captivity his brother Hugh of Lusignan, Archbishop of Nicosia, took charge of Cyprus.

After their victory the Mamluks pillaged Larnaca again and then the capital of Cyprus, Nicosia. The royal family retreated to fortified Kyrenia and were rescued. The invaders took a great deal of loot and captives before they left the island.

=== Captivity ===
That disaster, together with the previous raids, the war operations of Janus against Genoese, the epidemics and the invasion of locusts caused the Cypriot serfs, who lived in conditions of utter poverty, to revolt. The leader of the Cypriot revolutionaries was a person called Alexis, who was declared king in Lefkoniko. The revolution was big, and was supported by the population, who elected their own leaders in many places in Cyprus.

Meanwhile, Janus was humiliated in Cairo; they took him, tied up with chains and riding a donkey, in front of the Sultan, after which he was forced to kneel and worship nine times the soil on which he stepped. The release of Janus was effected after the intervention of Europeans, who collected money for the ransom. Cyprus also had to offer the Sultan an annual tax based on income from 5,000 duchies. This tax continued to be paid even after the end of Frankish rule in Cyprus. Together with Janus, some of the captives managed to buy their freedom after their families collected money to ransom them. Others remained captive and were sold as slaves.

While Janus was captive in Cyprus, the nobles and the royal family members were trying to deal with Alexis's rebellion and concurrently trying to achieve the release of Janus. With help from Europe, the rebellion was repressed after 10 months. The rebels' leader was arrested and after being tortured was executed in Nicosia on 12 May 1427, the same day that Janus arrived in Paphos from Cairo.

== Family and issue ==
Janus had nine children. Sometime after January 1400 he married Anglesia Visconti (died 1439), daughter of Bernabò Visconti, Lord of Milan, but the marriage was annulled and they divorced in 1408 or 1407/1409 without issue.

In 1411, he married Charlotte de Bourbon (born 1388 – died of the plague on 15 January 1422 and buried in Nicosia), daughter of John I, Count of La Marche and Catherine of Vendôme, at Nicosia; they had six children:

- John II or III of Lusignan (1414–1458)
- James of Lusignan (d. c. 1426)
- Anne of Lusignan, Princess of Cyprus (1418 or 1419 – 1462), married at Chambéry on 1 November 1433 or 12 February 1434 to Louis of Savoy
- Mary of Lusignan (died 1437)
- Hugo of Lusignan, Cardinal (born 1415)
- Phebus or Philip of Lusignan, sire of Sidon (born 1415)

Out of wedlock, he had three more children:

- Aloysius of Lusignan (1408 – after 1421)
- Guy of Lusignan (1410–1470), legitimized by the Pope Martin V in 1428
- A daughter de Lusignan, married 1427 Garceran Suarez de los Cernadilla, Admiral of Cyprus

== Sources ==
- Malloy, Alex (1994). Coins of the Crusader States, 1098-1291: Including the Kingdom of Jerusalem and Its Vassal States of Syria and Palestine, the Lusignan Kingdom of Cyprus (1192-1489), and the Latin Empire of Constantinople and Its Vassal States of Greece and the Archipelago. Attic Books.
- Coureas, Nicholas (2016). "Latin Cyprus and its relations with the Mamluk sultanate, 1250-1517". In Boas, Adrian (ed.). The Crusader World. Routledge.
- Edbury, Peter W. (1994). The Kingdom of Cyprus and the Crusades, 1191-1374. Cambridge University Press.
- Luke, Harry (1975). "The Kingdom of Cyprus". In Setton, Kenneth Meyer (ed.). A History of the Crusades: The fourteenth and fifteenth centuries. Vol. III. University of Wisconsin Press.
- Scott, John Beldon (2003). Architecture for the Shroud: Relic and Ritual in Turin. University of Chicago Press.
- Albizzi, Antonio (1608). Reges Hierusalem et Cypri". Blatt XXIV aus "Principum Christianorum Stemmata". Augsburg.
- Lusignan, Guy (2004). Mes Familles – Nos Mémoires: De l'Empire ottoman à nos jours. Les Éditions Universelles, Édition Numérique.

Regnal titles
Preceded by James I	King of Cyprus; 1398–1432	Succeeded by John II
Preceded by James I	— TITULAR — King of Jerusalem; King of Armenian Cilicia; 1398–1432	Succeeded by John II
