= List of Cypriot royal consorts =

== Empress and Despoina in Cyprus ==
Byzantine titles did not have any territorial qualification, so there were no Emperors or Despots of Cyprus.

Komnenoi dynasty, 1184–1191
Arms	Name	Father	Birth	Marriage	Became Empress	Ceased to be Empress	Death	Spouse
	Unnamed	Thoros II, Prince of Armenia (Rubenids)	1150–1164	1175/76	1184 became Despoina; 1185 became Empress	before 1185		Isaac Komnenos
	Unnamed	William I of Sicily (Hauteville)	-	1185/86		1 June 1191; Richard the Lionheart's conquest, husband's desposition	-	Isaac Komnenos

== Consort of Cyprus ==
House of Lusignan, 1192–1489
Arms/ Image	Name	Father	Birth	Marriage	Became Queen	Ceased to be Queen	Death	Spouse
	Eschive d'Ibelin	Baldwin d'Ibelin, Lord of Rama (Ibelin)	1160	before 29 October 1175	18 July 1194 husband's accession	Winter 1196–1197		Amalric I
	Isabella I of Jerusalem	Amalric I of Jerusalem (Anjou)	1172	January 1198		1 April 1205 husband's death	5 April 1205	Amalric I
	Alice of Champagne	Henry II, Count of Champagne (Blois)	1195/1196	before September 1210		10 January 1218 husband's death	1246	Hugh I
	Alix of Montferrat	William VI, Marquess of Montferrat (Aleramici)	1210/1215	May 1229		December 1232-May 1233		Henry I
	Stephanie of Lampron	Constantine of Lampron, Lord of Barbaron and Partzerpert (Lampron)	1220/1225	before 17 November 1237		1 April/September 1249		Henry I
	Plaisance of Antioch	Bohemond V of Antioch (Ramnulfids)	1235–1238	September 1250		10 Jan 1253 husband's death	27/22 September 1261	Henry I
	Isabella d'Ibelin, Lady of Beirut	John II d'Ibelin, Lord of Beirut (Ibelin)	1252	12 May 1265		5 December 1267 husband's death	before November 1283	Hugh II
	Isabella d'Ibelin	Guy d'Ibelin, constable of Cyprus (Ibelin)	1241/42	after 23 January 1255	5 December 1267 husband's accession	24 March 1284 husband's death	2 June 1324	Hugh III
	Constance of Sicily	Frederick III of Sicily (Barcelona)	1307	16 October 1317		31 August 1324 husband's death	after 19 June 1344	Henry II
	Alix d'Ibelin	Guy d'Ibelin, Lord of Nicosia (Ibelin)	1304/06	18 Jun 1318 (date of Papal dispensation)	31 March 1324 husband's accession	24 November 1358 husband's abdication	after 6 August 1386	Hugh IV
	Eleanor of Aragon	Infante Pedro, Count of Ribagorça and Prades (Barcelona)	1333	September 1353	24 November 1358 husband's accession	17 January 1369 husband's assassination	26 December 1416	Peter I
	Valentina Visconti	Bernabò Visconti (Visconti)	1360/1362	July/August 1378		13 October 1382 husband's death	before September 1393	Peter II
	Helvis of Brunswick-Grubenhagen	Philip of Brunswick-Grubenhagen, Constable of Jerusalem (Welf)	1353	1 May 1365	13 October 1382 husband's accession	9 September 1398 husband's death	15/25 January 1421	James I
	Anglesia Visconti	Bernabò Visconti, Lord of Milan (Visconti)	1377	after January 1400		1407-1409 divorce	12 October 1439	Janus
	Charlotte de Bourbon-La Marche	John I, Count of La Marche (Bourbon-La Marche)	1388	25 August 1411		15 January 1422		Janus
	Amadea Palaiologina of Monferrato	John Jacob Palaeologus, Marquess of Montferrat (Palaiologoi)	1418/20 or 3 August 1429	3 July 1440		13 September 1440		John II
	Helena Palaiologina	Theodore II Palaiologos, Lord of Morea (Palaiologoi)	3 February 1428	3 February 1442		11 April 1458		John II
	Catherine Cornaro	Marco Cornaro (Cornaro)	25 November 1454	December 1472		10 July 1473 husband's death; later became regent then queen regnant	10 July 1510	James II

== See also ==
- List of Latin Empresses
- Princess of Antioch
