= Alice of Majorca =

14th-century Cypriot noblewoman

- Born: 1341; Cyprus
- Died: after 1376
- Noble family: Barcelona
- Spouse: Philip of Ibelin
- Father: Ferdinand, Viscount of Omélas
- Mother: Eschive de Lusignan

Alice of Majorca (1341 – after 1376) was a Cypriot noblewoman, the great-granddaughter of King James II of Majorca and granddaughter of King Hugh IV of Cyprus. Her husband was Philip of Ibelin, seneschal of Cyprus, who was imprisoned in Genoa for murdering Alice's uncle, King Peter I. She later became the mistress of Jean de Moustry, Grand Admiral of Cyprus.

Coat-of-arms of the rulers of Majorca

== Family ==
Alice was born in Cyprus in 1341, the only child of Ferdinand, Viscount of Omélas, and Eschive de Lusignan, the eldest daughter of King Hugh IV of Cyprus and Alix of Ibelin. Her paternal grandfather was Ferdinand, son of King James II of Majorca. At the time of Alice's birth, her mother was being held in captivity by King Hugh as a result of the latter's violent quarrel with Alice's father, Ferdinand, who had been expelled from the kingdom. The King had accused Ferdinand's mother, Isabella of Ibelin, of having practised sorcery. As her father died in exile in Omélas, sometime between the time of her birth and 1347, Alice never knew him.

== Marriage ==
On 26 July 1355, she married one of her kinsmen, Philip of Ibelin, son of Balian, as his second wife. As they were related within the prohibited degrees of consanguinity, a papal dispensation was required for their marriage. Her uncle, who in 1358 had succeeded Hugh IV as King Peter I of Cyprus, was much displeased with Philip's marriage to Alice, who, being his niece, was a close member of the Cypriot royal family. In retaliation for Philip's temerity in marrying Alice, Peter banished him from the kingdom. Alice was forcibly detained on the island and forbidden to follow her husband in exile. It is not known whether or not she had any children by Philip.

Alice's mother died in 1363 during an outbreak of plague. Four years later, in 1367, Philip returned to Cyprus, and in 1369 assumed the leadership of a revolt against King Peter and of the group of barons who subsequently assassinated him. After the regicide, the king's son, Peter II, who was a minor, succeeded him, with his mother Eleanor and his uncles John and James acting as his regents. Eleanor suspected John and James of having been part of a plot to murder Peter II. Philip was immediately appointed seneschal of Cyprus; however, following the Genoese invasion in 1373 (which Queen Eleanor had secretly arranged), he was first imprisoned at Famagusta, then sent to prison in Genoa, where he was beheaded sometime between 1374 and 1376.

== Love affairs ==
In 1370, according to Rudt-Collenberg, Alice became the mistress of Jean de Moustry, the Grand Admiral of Cyprus. As with her husband, it is not recorded whether any children were born to her as a result of her affair with the admiral. There were also rumours that she had an affair with Genoese Admiral Pietro di Campo Fregosa, who had connived at her husband's death. It was recorded in the Chronicle of Amadi that Alice did not intervene on Philip's behalf in order to save him from execution because she feared his vengeance if he were released.

Alice died on an unrecorded date sometime after 1376.
