= Queen mother =

Mother of a reigning monarch

A queen mother is a former queen consort, often a queen dowager, who is the mother of the reigning monarch. (Note: A queen mother is defined as "A Queen dowager who is the mother of the reigning sovereign" by both the Oxford English Dictionary and Webster's Third New International Dictionary.) The term's usage in English dates back to the early 1560s. It arose in hereditary monarchies in Europe and is also used to describe a number of similar yet distinct monarchical concepts in non-European cultures around the world.

"The Queen Mother" usually, in English, refers to Queen Elizabeth the Queen Mother (queen consort, 1936–1952; queen mother, 1952–2002), who was the mother of Queen Elizabeth II and one of the few people to use the term as an official style. However, it was also used as an official title in Thailand where Sirikit, the mother of King Vajiralongkorn, was officially styled "The Queen Mother".

== Status ==
It is unclear if a queen consort whose husband abdicates the throne, or a queen regnant who abdicates, and is the mother of the current monarch would be the queen mother. In many countries, such as the United Kingdom, a monarch loses the title of king or queen after abdication. For example, Juliana of the Netherlands, who abdicated in favor of her daughter Beatrix, was sometimes colloquially referred to as the queen mother despite declining the title and having reverted to being a princess. Queen Paola of Belgium, whose husband Albert II abdicated but retained the title of king, has generally been referred to as the queen mother of Philippe despite not being a queen dowager.

A former queen consort who is the grandmother of the reigning monarch is sometimes called the queen grandmother. Queen Sri Savarindira of Thailand was known by this style.

=== United Kingdom ===
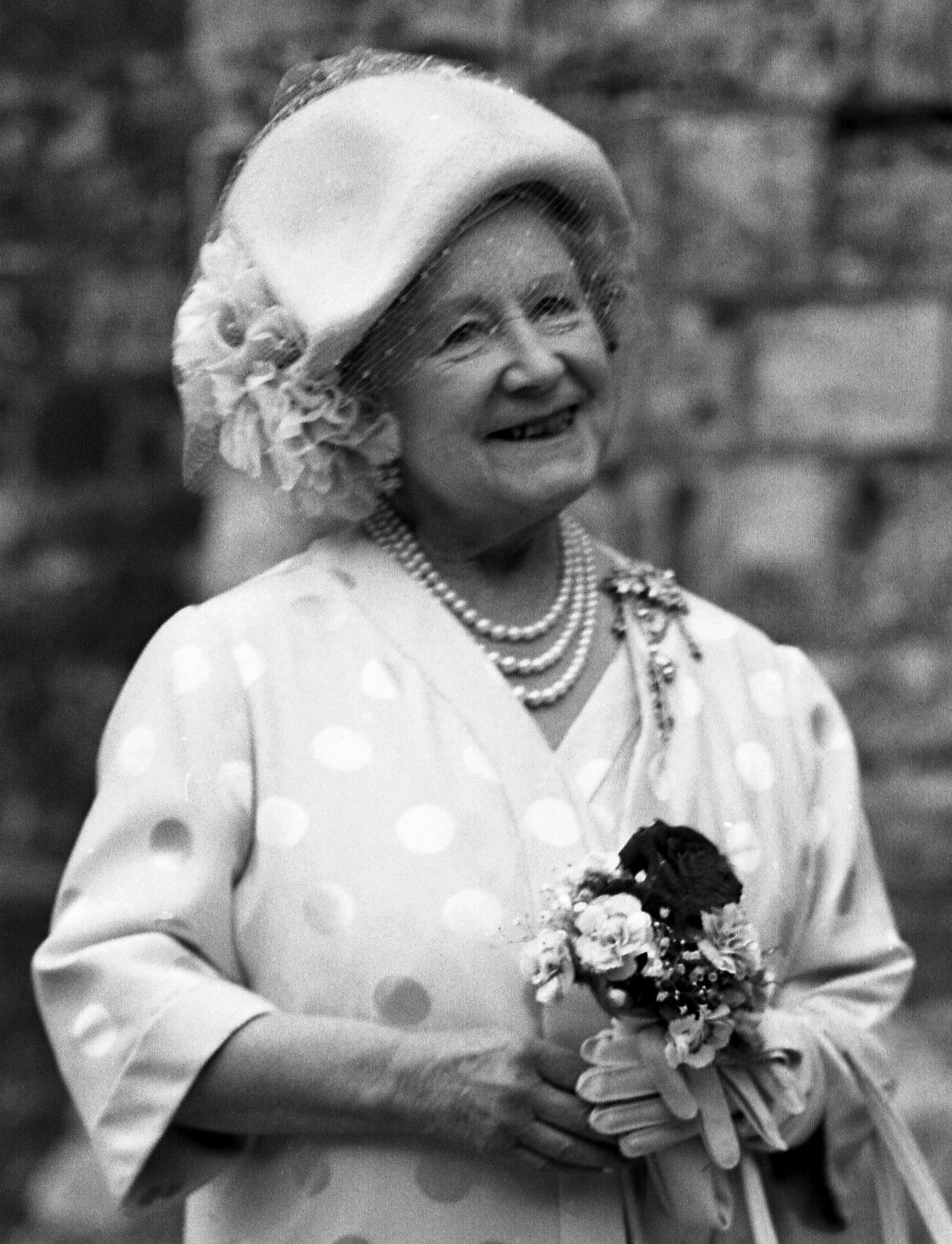
The widowed mother of Queen Elizabeth II was known as Queen Elizabeth the Queen Mother.

The title "queen mother" evolved to distinguish a queen dowager from all other queens when she is also the mother of the reigning sovereign. Thus, upon the death of her husband, King George V, Queen Mary became queen mother, retaining the status throughout the reigns of her sons, Edward VIII and George VI.

There is no male equivalent to a queen mother (i.e. "king father"). This would occur only if the husband of a queen regnant were to outlive the queen and was thereafter father to the new king or queen. Such a situation has never occurred. Since the title "queen mother" derives from the woman's previous title of "queen", it would also be incongruous to call such a father of a monarch the "king father", as the husbands of queens regnant are not given the title "king", but rather titled as a prince. The exact title such a person would assume has not been clarified by royal lineage experts. "Prince father" is a possibility.

=== Ottoman Empire ===
In the Ottoman Empire, valide sultan (Ottoman Turkish: والده سلطان) or sultana mother was the title held by the mother of a ruling Sultan. The title was first used in the 16th century for Hafsa Sultan, consort of Selim I and mother of Suleiman the Magnificent, superseding the previous title of mehd-i ülya ("cradle of the great"). The Turkish pronunciation of the word Valide is [vaː.liˈde].

The second position the most important position in the Ottoman Empire after the sultan himself and being more powerful in the hierarchy than Haseki sultan. As the mother to the sultan, by Islamic tradition ("A mother's right is God's right"), the valide sultan would have a significant influence on the affairs of the empire. She had great power in the court and her own rooms (always adjacent to her son's) and state staff. In particular during the 17th century, in a period known as the "Sultanate of Women", a series of incompetent or child sultans raised the role of the valide sultan to new heights.

=== India ===
In India, a queen (usually styled rani, or in the Muslim tradition, begum) who becomes queen-mother was known in Sanskrit and Hindi as a rajamata – literally, mother of the king/monarch.

=== Africa ===
In Eswatini, the queen mother, or Ndlovukati, reigns alongside her son. She serves as a ceremonial figurehead, while her son serves as the administrative head of state. He has absolute power. She is important at festivals such as the annual reed dance ceremony.

In many matrilineal societies of West Africa, such as the Ashanti, the queen mother is the one through whom royal descent is reckoned and thus wields considerable power. One of the greatest leaders of Ashanti was Nana Yaa Asantewaa (1840–1921), who led her subjects against the British Empire during the War of the Golden Stool in 1900.

In more symbolically driven societies such as the kingdoms of the Yoruba peoples, the queen mother may not even be a blood relative of the reigning monarch. She could be a female individual of any age who is vested with the ritual essence of the departed queens in a ceremonial sense, and who is practically regarded as the monarch's mother as a result. A good example of this is Oloye Erelu Kuti I of Lagos, who has been seen as the iya oba or queen mother of every succeeding king of that realm, due to the activities of the three successors to her noble title that have reigned since her demise.

== Historical examples ==
These mothers of monarchs, and others, albeit not always officially so titled have also been considered equal to queen mothers:

- Adela of Champagne (1180–1206) France
- Adelaide of Aquitaine (996–1004) France
- Adelaide of Burgundy (973–983) Germany and Italy
- Adelaide of Maurienne (1137–1154) France
- Adelaide of Paris (898–901) West Francia
- Ageltrude (894–898) Italy
- Agnes of Aquitaine (1137–1159) Aragon
- Agnes of Brandenburg (1286–1304) Denmark
- Agnes of Poitou (1056–1077) Germany, Italy, and Burgundy
- Alexandra of Denmark (1910–1925) United Kingdom
- Alice of Champagne (1218–1246) Cyprus
- Alice of Ibelin (1358–1369, 1382–1386) Cyprus
- Aliya bint Ali (1939–1950) Iraq
- Amalie Auguste of Bavaria (1873–1877) Saxony
- Amarindra (1810–1826) Siam
- Amélie of Orléans (1908–1910) Portugal
- Alexandrine of Mecklenburg-Schwerin (1947–1952) Denmark
- Anastasia of Kiev (1063–1074) Hungary
- Anna Pavlovna of Russia (1849–1865) Netherlands
- Anne of Austria (1643–1666) France
- Anne of Kiev (1060–1075) France
- Athaliah (c. 842 – 841 BCE) Judah
- Augusta of Saxe-Weimar-Eisenach (1888) Prussia
- Bathsheba (11th century BC) Israel and Judah
- Bertha of Swabia (937–966) Burgundy
- Bertrada of Laon (768–783) Francia
- Beatrice of Castile (1279–1303) Portugal
- Beatrice of Castile (1357–1359) Portugal
- Berengaria of Castile (1217–1246) Castile
- Blanche of Castile (1226–1252) France
- Blanche of Namur (1343–1362) Norway
- Bona Sforza (1548–1557) Poland
- Best Olimi Kemigisa of Tooro ( 1987- 2026 ) Uganda
- Carlota Joaquina of Spain (1825–1830) Portugal and Brazil
- Catherine Cornaro (1473–1474) Cyprus
- Catherine de' Medici (1559–1589) France
- Catherine of Lancaster (1406–1418) Castile
- Catherine of Valois (1401–1437) England
- Charlotte of Savoy (1483) France
- Charlotte Amalie of Hesse-Kassel (1699–1714) Denmark and Norway
- Christina Hvide (1195–1200) Sweden
- Christina of Denmark (1167–1170) Sweden
- Christina of Holstein-Gottorp (1611–1625) Sweden
- Christina of Saxony (1513–1521) Denmark and Norway
- Clementia of Hungary (1316) France
- Constance of Aragon (1204–1205) Hungary
- Constance of Arles (1031–1032) France
- Constance of Hungary (1230–1240) Bohemia
- Constance of Portugal (1312–1313) Castile and León
- Constance of Sicily (1285–1302) Aragon and Sicily
- Damit binti Abdul Rahman (1967–1978) Brunei
- Désirée Clary (1844–1859) Sweden and Norway
- Divyeshwari (1911–1933) Nepal
- Dorothea of Brandenburg (1481–1495) Denmark and Norway
- Dorothea of Saxe-Lauenburg (1559–1571) Denmark and Norway
- Eadgifu of Kent (939–955) Wessex
- Eadgifu of Wessex (936–951) West Francia
- Ealhswith (899–902) Wessex
- Eleanor of Alburquerque (1416–1435) Aragon
- Eleanor of Anjou (1337–1341) Sicily
- Eleanor of Aquitaine (1189–1204) England
- Eleanor of Aragon (1369–1382) Cyprus
- Eleanor of Aragon (1438–1445) Portugal
- Eleanor of England (1214) Castile
- Elizabeth of Poland (1342–1380) Hungary
- Eleanor of Provence (1272–1291) England
- Eleonore Magdalene of Neuburg (1705–1720) Hungary and Bohemia
- Elena of Montenegro (1946) Italy
- Ælfthryth (978–1000) England
- Elisabeth of Bavaria (1934–1951) Belgium
- Elisabeth of Bavaria (1254–1268) Jerusalem and Sicily
- Elisabeth Farnese (1759–1766) Spain
- Elisabeth Christine of Brunswick-Wolfenbüttel (1745–1750) Hungary and Bohemia
- Elizabeth of Austria (1492–1505) Poland
- Elizabeth of Bosnia (1382–1387) Hungary and Croatia
- Elizabeth Bowes-Lyon (1952–2002) United Kingdom: the widow of King George VI and mother of Queen Elizabeth II. In some of the British media, Queen Elizabeth The Queen Mother was often referred to as the Queen Mum, and the term "Queen Mother" remained associated with her after her death.
- Elizabeth of Carinthia (1342–1352) Sicily
- Elizabeth the Cuman (1272–1290) Hungary
- Elizabeth of Luxembourg (1440–1442) Bohemia and Hungary
- Elizabeth of Aragon (1325–1336) Portugal
- Elizabeth Woodville (1483) England
- Emma of Italy (986–987) West Francia
- Emma of Normandy (1035–1052) Denmark and England
- Emma of Waldeck and Pyrmont (1890–1934) Netherlands
- Ermengard of Italy (887–897) Provence
- Ermengarde de Beaumont (1214–1233) Scotland
- Estrid of the Obotrites (1022–1035) Sweden
- Euphrosyne of Kiev (1162–1193) Hungary
- Frederica of Hanover (1964–1973) Greece
- Frederica Louisa of Hesse-Darmstadt (1797–1805) Prussia
- Gayatri Rajapatni (1309–1350) Majapahit (Indonesia)
- Gerberga of Saxony (954–984) West Francia
- Gisela of Swabia (1039–1043) Germany, Italy, and Burgundy
- Giovanna of Italy (1943–1946) Bulgaria
- Gorakshya Rajya Lakshmi Devi (1816) Nepal
- Gunnhild, Mother of Kings (961–970) Norway
- Hafsa Sultan (1520–1534) Ottoman Empire
- Hamida Banu Begum (1556–1604) Mughal India
- Handan Sultan (1603–1605) Ottoman Empire
- Halime Sultan (1617–1623) Ottoman Empire
- Halaevalu Mataʻaho ʻAhomeʻe (2006–2017) Tonga

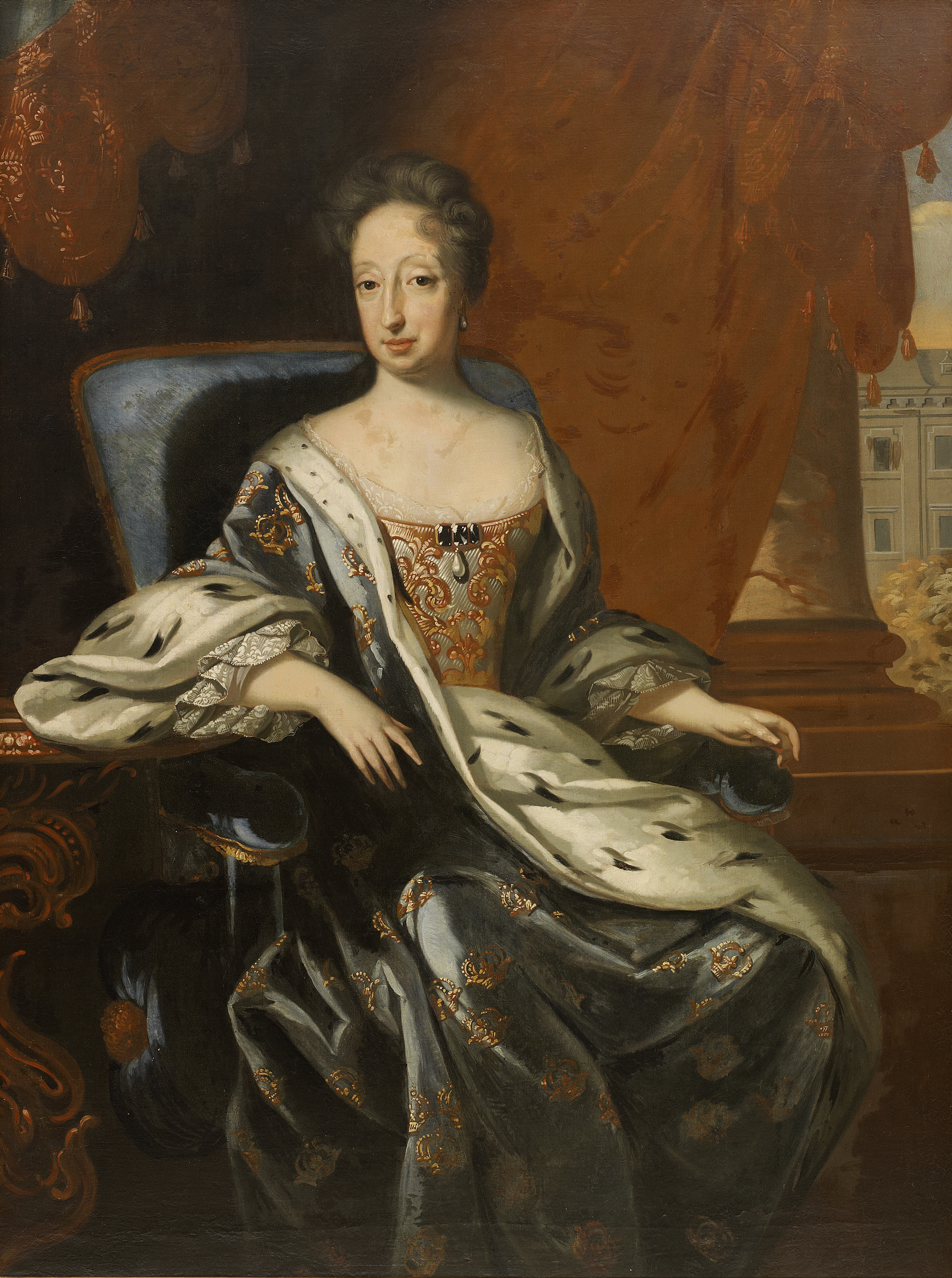
Queen Hedwig Eleanor of Sweden (née Princess of Holstein-Gottorp) was twice regent of that country, once for her only son, once for a grandson

- Hedvig Eleonora of Holstein-Gottorp (1660–1697) Sweden
- Helen of Greece and Denmark (1940–1947) Romania
- Helena of Serbia (1141–1146) Hungary
- Helvig of Holstein (1290–1318) Sweden
- Helvis of Brunswick-Grubenhagen (1398–1421) Cyprus
- Henrietta Maria of France (1649–1669) England and Scotland
- Hortense de Beauharnais (1810) Holland
- Huzaima bint Nasser (1933–1935) Iraq
- Ingeborg of Denmark (1280–1287) Norway
- Ingrid of Sweden (1972–2000) Denmark
- Isabeau of Bavaria (1422–1435) France
- Isabella II of Spain (1874–1885) Spain
- Isabella of Angoulême (1216–1246) England
- Isabella of France (1327–1358) England
- Isabella of Ibelin (1284–1324) Cyprus and Jerusalem
- Isabella of Portugal (1474–1496) Portugal
- Jadwiga of Kalisz (1333–1339) Poland
- Joan Beaufort (1437–1445) Scotland
- Jezebel (c. 852 – 842 BC) Israel
- Josephine of Leuchtenberg (1859–1876) Sweden and Norway
- Jijabai (1598–1674) Maratha Empire (India)
- Juana Manuel (1379–1381) Castile and León
- Judith of Bavaria (940–943) West Francia
- Kanti Rajya Lakshmi Devi Shah (1955–1972) Nepal
- Keōpūolani (1778–1823) Hawaii (United States)
- Kesang Choden (1972–2006) Bhutan [current Queen Grandmother]
- Kösem Sultan (1623–1648) Ottoman Empire
- Kunigunda of Halych (1278–1285) Bohemia
- Louisa Ulrika of Prussia (1771–1782) Sweden
- Louise of Sweden (1912–1926) Denmark
- Luisa de Guzmán (1656–1666) Portugal
- 'Mamohato Bereng Seeiso (1990–1995, 1996–2003) Lesotho
- Atossa (520–486 BC) Iran
- Amestris (424 BC) Iran
- Parysatis (404 BC) Iran
- Musa of Parthia (2 BC – 4 AD)
- Shapurdukhtak (274–293) Iran
- Ifra Hormizd (c. 309 AD – c. 325 AD) Iran
- Sayyida Shirin (1028) Iran
- Terken Khatun (1092–1094) Iran
- Zubayda Khatun (1056) Iran
- Terken Khatun (1172–1200) Iran
- Makhdum Shah (1318–1384) Iran
- Sara Khatun (1457–1478) Iran
- Seljuk Shah Begum (1452–1490) Iran
- Terken Khatun (1156–1172) Iran
- Tajlu Khanum (1504–1524) Iran
- Sultanum Begum (1524–1576) Iran
- Anna Khanum (1647) Iran
- Nakihat Khanum (1666–1694) Iran
- Asiye Khanum Ezzeddin Qajar (1797–1834) Iran
- Galin Khanum (1834–1848) Iran
- Malek Jahan Khanom (1848–1873) Persia
- Malekeh Jahan (1909–1925) Persia
- Malika Kishwar (1803–1858) Awadh
- Margaret of Denmark (1380–1387) Norway
- Margaret of Bourbon (1253–1256) Navarre
- Margaret of Durazzo (1386–1412) Naples
- Margaret of Navarre (1166–1183) Sicily
- Margaret Sambiria (1259–1282) Denmark
- Margaret Tudor (1513–1541) Scotland
- Margaret of Provence (1270–1285) France
- Margaret Skulesdatter (1263–1270) Norway
- Margherita of Savoy (1900–1926) Italy
- Maria of Austria (1576–1603) Hungary and Bohemia
- María de Molina (1295–1312) Castile and León
- Maria of Portugal (1350–1357) Castile and León
- Maria of Romania (1934–1945) Yugoslavia
- Maria Amalia of Saxony (1759–1760) Naples and Sicily
- Maria Anna of Austria (1750–1754) Portugal
- Maria Christina of Austria (1886–1929) Spain
- Maria Christina of the Two Sicilies (1833–1868) Spain
- Maria Eleonora of Brandenburg (1632–1654) Sweden
- María Isabella of Spain (1830–1848) Two Sicilies
- Maria Laskarina (1270) Hungary
- Maria Leopoldina of Austria (1826) Portugal
- Maria Luisa of Parma (1808–1819) Spain
- Maria Luisa of Spain (1792) Hungary and Bohemia
- Maria Luisa of Spain (1803–1807) Etruria
- Maria Pia of Savoy (1889–1908) Portugal
- Maria Theresa (1765–1780) Germany
- Maria Theresa of Austria (1849–1855) Sardinia
- Mariam-uz-Zamani (1605–1623) Mughal India
- Mariana of Austria (1665–1696) Spain
- Mariana Victoria of Spain (1777–1781) Portugal
- Marie de Coucy (1249–1285) Scotland
- Marie de' Medici (1610–1642) France
- Marie of Anjou (1461–1463) France
- Marie of Prussia (1864–1889) Bavaria
- Marie of Edinburgh (1930–1938) Romania
- Mary of Guelders (1460–1463) Scotland
- Mary of Guise (1542–1560) Scotland
- Mary of Hungary (1309–1323) Naples
- Mary of Teck (1936–1952) United Kingdom: widow of King George V and mother of kings Edward VIII and George VI. Queen Mary never used the title Queen Mother, because she thought it implied advancing years, choosing instead to be known as "Queen Mary" and that style was used to describe her in the Court Circular.
- Mary, Queen of Scots (1567–1587) Scotland
- Musbah bint Nasser (1951–1952) Jordan
- Nana Afia Kobi Serwaa Ampem II (1999–2016) Ashanti people (Ghana)
- Narriman Sadek (1952–1953) Egypt
- Natalija Keshko (1889–1903) Serbia
- Nazli Sabri (1936–1952) Egypt
- Nurbanu Sultan (1574–1583) Ottoman Empire
- Olga Constantinovna of Russia (1913–1917, 1920–1922) Greece
- Ota (899–903) East Francia
- Pauline Therese of Württemberg (1864–1873) Württemberg
- Phuntsho Choden (1952–1972) Bhutan
- Plaisance of Antioch (1254–1261) Cyprus
- Perestu Sultan (1876–1904) Ottoman Empire
- Rajendra Rajya Laxmi Devi (1777–1785) Nepal
- Ratna Rajya Lakshmi Devi Shah (1972–2008) Nepal
- Rikissa of Denmark (1216–1220) Sweden
- Richeza of Poland (1074–1077) Hungary
- Safiye Sultan (1595–1604) Ottoman Empire
- Sancha of Castile (1196–1208) Aragon
- Sancha of León (1065–1067) León
- Saovabha Phongsri (1910–1919) Thailand
- Sibylla of Acerra (1194) Sicily
- Sirikit (2016–2025) Thailand
- Sophia of Halshany (1434–1461) Poland
- Sophia of Minsk (1182–1198) Denmark
- Sophia of Nassau (1907–1913) Sweden
- Sophia of Prussia (1917–1920, 1922–1924) Greece
- Sophie of Mecklenburg-Güstrow (1588–1631) Denmark and Norway
- Sophie Amalie of Brunswick-Calenberg (1670–1685) Denmark and Norway
- Sophia Dorothea of Hanover (1740–1757) Prussia
- Sophia Magdalena of Denmark (1792–1809) Sweden
- Sophie Magdalene of Brandenburg-Kulmbach (1746–1766) Denmark and Norway
- Tadj ol-Molouk (1941–1979) Persia
- Taj ol-Molouk (1907–1909) Persia
- Theophanu (983–991) Germany
- Therese of Saxe-Hildburghausen (1848–1854) Bavaria
- Tiye (14th century BC) Egypt
- Turhan Sultan (1648–1683) Ottoman Empire
- Violant of Aragon (1284–1295) Castile and León
- Victoria, Princess Royal (1888–1901) Prussia
- Xiaoqinxian (1861–1908) Qing China
- Zein al-Sharaf Talal (1952–1994) Jordan

== Exceptional cases ==
- Princess Helen of Greece and Denmark was the wife of Carol, Crown Prince of Romania from 1921 to 1928 and the mother of King Michael I of Romania. Although not a Queen Consort, Princess Helen was granted the title of 'The Queen Mother of Romania' creating her a Queen as: Queen Helen, The Queen Mother of Romania

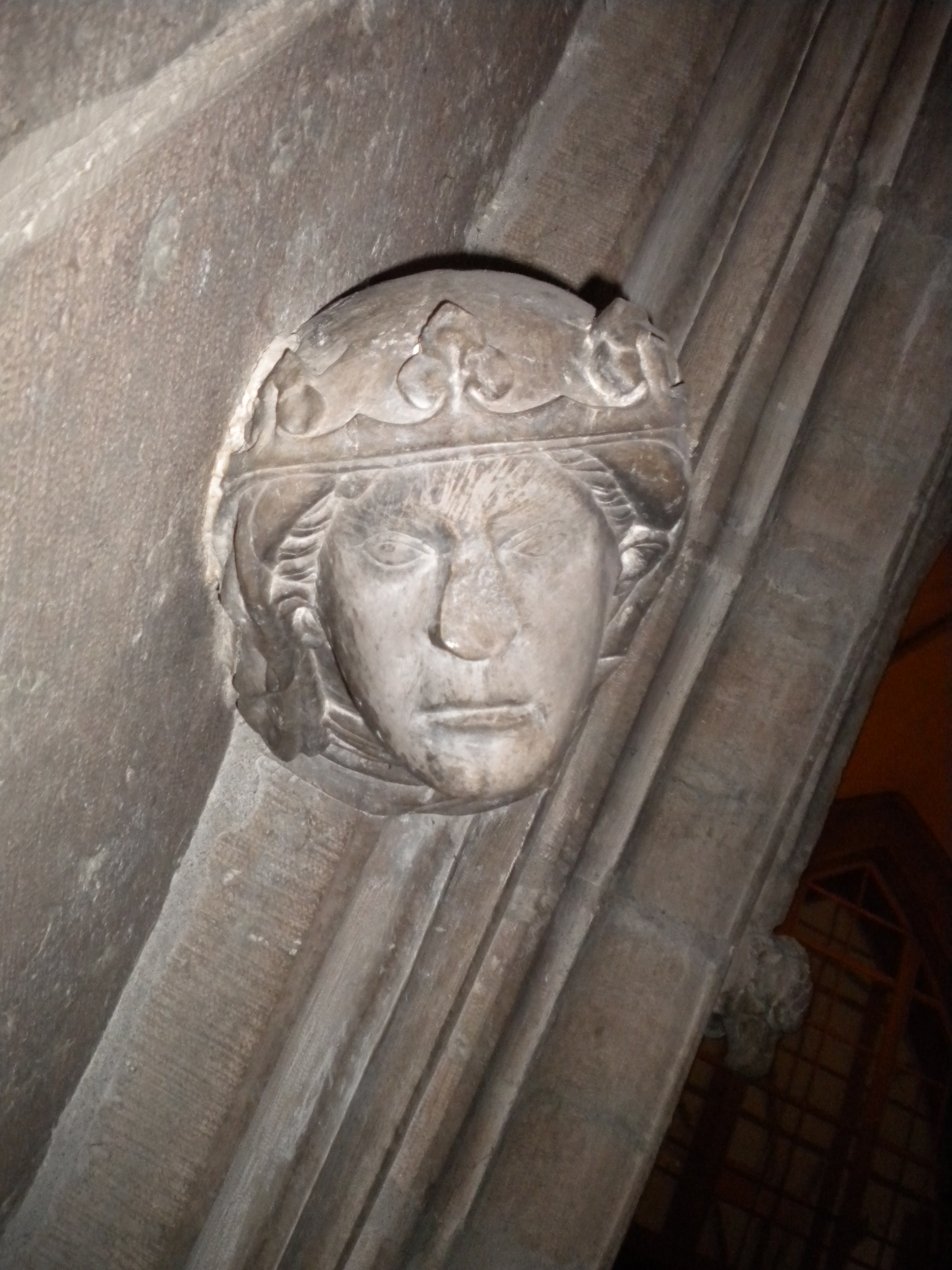
Duchess Ingeborg was regent of Norway and Sweden 1318–1319

- Ingeborg of Norway (1301–1361), Duchess of Södermanland, acted and ranked as if she were a queen regnant for a year before the Swedish reign of her son, King Magnus IV, and thereafter as if she were his queen mother, serving intermittently on his board of regents. However, though she has been called the King Mother in biographical literature, she was never officially recognized as queen or queen mother.
- Her granddaughter-in-law Margaret (1353–1412), who ruled all of Scandinavia as the mother of one king and the adoptive mother of another, held a similarly complicated unofficial position but for much longer, and in traditional history is given the title of Queen. Early in her career, she had been Queen consort of Norway for seventeen years and of Sweden for one year.
- Jijabai (1598–1674) was neither consort of a ruling king nor a ruling queen or regent. In practical terms, her husband Shahaji was a nobleman under other rulers, but her son founded an independent empire and became its sovereign. Hence she is given the title Queen Mother – Rajmata in Hindi.
- Sadijé Toptani (1876–1934), mother of King Zog I of Albania: after her son became king in 1928, she was raised to the title Queen Mother of the Albanians (Nëna Mbretëreshë e Shqiptarëve) with the style of Her Majesty, a position she held from September 1, 1928, until her death.
- Similarly, Gayatri Devi, Maharani of Jaipur (1919–2009) was the third wife of her husband, the monarch, but not the mother of his successor, a son by the king's first wife. However, she has been accorded the title of queen mother (Rajmata) anyway.
- The Valide sultan or Sultana mother was title which usually held by the mother of the reigning Ottoman Sultan, even though she may never have been chief consort (Haseki Sultan, later BaşKadın).

== King father ==
The male equivalent of a queen mother, being a male former monarch or consort who is the father of the reigning monarch, is sometimes known as the "king father" or another variation based on the title of the monarch or consort. If a king abdicates and passes the throne to his child, or if a reigning queen abdicates or dies and is survived by her husband, he might acquire a substantive title.

=== Examples ===
- King Norodom Sihanouk of Cambodia was styled as "His Majesty King Father Norodom Sihanouk" when he abdicated the throne in favour of his son, Norodom Sihamoni.
- Jigme Singye Wangchuck became the king father of Bhutan following his abdication in favour of his son, Jigme Khesar Namgyel Wangchuck.
- Hamad bin Khalifa Al Thani became the "Father Emir" of Qatar following his abdication as emir in favour of his son, Tamim bin Hamad Al Thani.
- After King Albert II of the Belgians abdicated in 2013, his style was shortened to His Majesty King Albert (as did King Leopold III); he is the father of King Philippe of Belgium.
- After Sultan Omar Ali Saifuddien III of Brunei abdicated, his style became "His Majesty The Sultan-Father" (Malay: Duli Yang Teramat Mulia Paduka Seri Begawan Sultan).
- Francisco, Duke of Cádiz, the king consort of Isabel II of Spain, was king father to Alfonso XII of Spain.
- Ferdinand II of Portugal, jure uxoris king to Maria II of Portugal, was king father to Pedro V of Portugal and Luís I of Portugal.
- Following his abdication, Ludwig I of Bavaria was king father to Maximilian II of Bavaria.
- In the former Chinese Empire, a living monarch who passed the throne to his son was called Taishang Huang. This title was last bestowed upon Qianlong Emperor.

== Current comparisons ==
The following individuals hold a similar role as mothers or fathers of their country's reigning monarchs:

- Ntfombi, Ndlovukati of Eswatini (from 1986)
- Queen Norodom Monineath of Cambodia (from 2004)
- Princess Beatrix of the Netherlands (from 2013)
- Moza bint Nasser (from 2013)
- Queen Paola of Belgium (from 2013)
- Queen Sofía of Spain (from 2014)
- Empress Emerita Michiko of Japan (from 2019)
- Queen Margrethe II of Denmark (from 2024)
- Grand Duchess Maria Teresa of Luxembourg (from 2025)
- Queen Sonja of Norway (from 2026)

== See also ==
- Mahd-i Ulya
- Empress dowager
- Valide sultan
- Ndlovukati
- Queen dowager
