= Helvis of Brunswick-Grubenhagen =

Queen consort of Cyprus
- Tenure: 13 October 1382 – 9 September 1398
- Born: 1353
- Died: 15 January 1421 (aged 67–68)
- Burial: Saint Dominic's, Nicosia
- Spouse: James I of Cyprus
- Issue among others...: Janus, King of Cyprus; Philip, Constable of Cyprus; Henry, Prince of Galilee; Hugh, Patriarch of Jerusalem; Guy, Constable of Cyprus; Mary, Queen of Naples
- House: Welf
- Father: Philip of Brunswick-Grubenhagen
- Mother: Helvis de Dampierre

Helvis of Brunswick-Grubenhagen (1353 – 15 January 1421) was the queen consort of Cyprus and titular queen consort of Armenia as the wife of King James I of Cyprus. She was styled Queen of Cyprus from 1382 to 1398; although at the time of James's ascension to the Cypriot throne, she and James were imprisoned in Genoa after they had been captured by the Genoese on the island of Rhodes. Almost all of Helvis 11 children were born whilst she was imprisoned. In 1385, after negotiations and many ruinous concessions to the Genoese, they were released and James was crowned king. In 1393, she became Queen of Armenia.

== Family ==
Helvis was born in 1353, the eldest child and only daughter of Philip of Brunswick-Grubenhagen, Constable of Jerusalem (son of Henry II, Duke of Brunswick-Grubenhagen), and Helvis de Dampierre, daughter of Eudes de Dampierre and Isabelle de Lusignan. Through both her parents, she was a remote descendant of the celebrated Crusader John of Ibelin, the Old Lord of Beirut. Helvis had a younger brother, John of Brunswick-Grubenhagen, who would later serve as Admiral of Cyprus. In 1368, nine years after her mother's death, Helvis's father married Helvis's mother-in-law, Alix of Ibelin, the Dowager Queen of Cyprus. A year later, he died.

== Marriage and imprisonment ==
On 1 May 1365, when she was 12 years old, she married James de Lusignan, the third son of King Hugh IV of Cyprus and Alix of Ibelin, who three years later became her stepmother. James was 19 years her senior. As they were cousins, a Papal dispensation was required for their marriage.

In 1369, James became one of the regents for his nephew Peter II after his eldest brother King Peter I had been assassinated by a group of barons led by Philip Ibelin. In 1372 James led a war against the Genoese; at its conclusion in 1373 when the Genoese invaded Cyprus, he and Helvis were compelled to flee the kingdom. They went to the island of Rhodes, where her first child, a daughter, was born on an unknown date and died as a baby in 1374. In the same year, James and Helvis were both captured by the Genoese, and taken as hostages to Genoa where they were imprisoned. It was recorded in the Chronicle of Amadi that Helvis was constrained to perform manual work before she joined him in the prison, which was known colloquially as la mal paga. It was there that she gave birth to their first son, Janus, whom she named after the god who had been, according to an ancient legend, the traditional founder of Genoa. Eleven other children followed, most of them having been born during her imprisonment.

== Queen of Cyprus ==
On 13 October 1382, Peter II died and James succeeded as King of Cyprus; although he and Helvis were still being held captive. Finally, after much negotiation and many concessions to the Genoese, which would ultimately bring his kingdom to financial ruin, James and Helvis were released from prison and returned to Cyprus. In May 1385, he was crowned king at Saint Sophia Cathedral in Nicosia. Their eldest son, Janus was left behind in Genoa as a hostage. In 1389, James was crowned titular King of Jerusalem; and on 29 November 1393, upon the death of King Leo V of Armenia, he assumed the title of King of Armenia. He was not proclaimed King of Armenia until 1396 in the Cathedral of Holy Wisdom in Nicosia. From the time of her husband's accession to both thrones, Helvis was styled as Queen of Cyprus and Queen of Armenia, until James's death on 9 September 1398. He was succeeded by their eldest son, Janus.

Helvis died on 15 January 1421, and was buried in Saint Dominic's, Nicosia.

== Issue ==
- A daughter (born and died 1374)
- King Janus of Cyprus (1375–1432), married firstly Anglesia Visconti (1377–1439); secondly, Charlotte de Bourbon-La Marche, by whom he had issue, including John II of Cyprus and Anne de Lusignan.
- Philip de Lusignan, Constable of Cyprus; died unmarried but had at least one illegitimate son, Lancelot de Lusignan.
- Henry de Lusignan (died 1427), titular Prince of Galilee; married his cousin Eleonore de Lusignan; his marriage was childless, however, he had illegitimate issue.
- Eudes de Lusignan (died 1421), titular seneschal of Jerusalem; married his cousin, Loysia de Lusignan; died without issue.
- Hugh de Lusignan (died 1442), Regent of Cyprus; Cardinal Archbishop of Nicosia
- Guy de Lusignan, Constable of Cyprus; died unmarried, without issue.
- Jacqua de Lusignan (died 1396/1398), unmarried and childless.
- Eschive de Lusignan (died after 1406), married Count Sclavus von Asperg
- Marie of Lusignan (1381–1404), married King Ladislaus of Naples; died childless.
- Agnes de Lusignan (1382–1459), Abbess of Wunstorf
- Isabelle de Lusignan, married Pierre de Lusignan; died childless.

Royal titles
Preceded by Valentina Visconti	Queen consort of Cyprus; 1382–1398	Succeeded by Anglesia Visconti
