= Pierre de Lusignan =

Pierre de Lusignan may refer to:

- Peter I of Cyprus (1328–1369), king of Cyprus 1358–1369
- Peter II of Cyprus, the Fat (ca. 1357–1382), his son, king of Cyprus 1369–1382
