= Peter of Cyprus =

Peter of Cyprus may refer to:

- Peter I of Cyprus
- Peter II of Cyprus
