= Peter, Count of Ribagorza =

Peter of Aragon (Catalan: Pere d'Aragó, Spanish: Pedro de Aragón; 1305 – 4 November 1381) was an infante (royal prince) of the Crown of Aragon who served three successive kings as a soldier, diplomat and counsellor before joining the Franciscans in 1358.

Psalm 44, from the illuminated manuscript BnF lat. 8846, the Anglo-Catalan Psalter. The miniatures in this manuscript were painted by Ferrer Bassa under the patronage of Peter of Ribagorza between 1346 and 1348.

Peter was the Count of Ribagorza (1322–1358), Count of Empúries (1325–1341) and Count of Prades (1341–1358). He was the most important counsellor of Alfonso IV and Peter IV, and was regent during the absence of the latter (1354–1356). He took part in most of the major military conflicts of their reigns down to his death.

Peter was also an author and patron of letters. As a Franciscan, he advocated an end to the Avignon Papacy and wrote a prophetic tract to that effect.

== Younger son ==
Peter was born in 1305 in Barcelona, the eighth child of King James II of Aragon and Blanche of Anjou. In the opinion of Ernest Martínez Ferrando, he was James's favourite son.

When his oldest brother, James, became a monk in 1319, Peter was declared second in line to throne after his brother, the future Alfonso IV. The birth to Alfonso of a son, the future Peter IV, later that year soon displaced him. In 1322, his father granted him the County of Ribagorza and the baronies of Gandia and Pego in the Kingdom of Valencia. In 1323, he asked his father to again name him as Alfonso's heir in the event that Alfonso died during his expedition to Sardinia. James refused.

Peter had a reputation as a man of culture. He wrote in prose and verse on topics moral, political and historical. He attracted Occitan authors to Catalonia. In 1324, the troubadour Raimon de Cornet dedicated to him his Doctrinal de trobar and Joan de Castellnou dedicated to him his Glossari in 1341.

During 1323–1324, Peter served as procurator general of the Crown of Aragon. In 1325, in a meeting of the Cortes of Aragon, James confirmed Alfonso's son Peter as next in line to the throne and granted Peter of Ribagorza the County of Empúries. Peter fortified Empúries against Muslim pirate attacks, enlarged the comital palace and the parish church in Castelló and granted privileges to merchants.

Following the death of King Henry II of Cyprus in 1324, Peter was mooted as a possible husband for his widow, Constance, but the requisite papal dispensation was refused.

In 1325, Peter was dispatched on an embassy to negotiate an exemption from the annual census (tax) that James was required to pay the papacy for the Kingdom of Sardinia and Corsica. In 1327, Peter was present at the inauguration of the monastery of Pedralbes and at the ceremony where James III of Majorca swore fealty to Alfonso IV, who had succeeded James that year. In 1328, Peter assisted at Alfonso's coronation. While Alfonso placed the crown on his own head, his brothers—Archbishop John of Toledo, Count Ramon Berenguer of Prades and Peter—adjusted it. The chronicler Ramon Muntaner provides a detailed account of the coronation. He calls Peter "most gracious and wise ... among the most subtle in the world".

== Elder statesman ==
The introduction and dedication of Joan de Castellnou's Glossari (1341). The boxed text reads: "to the honor of the most high, powerful lord, my lord the infante Sir Peter, of the most powerful Sir James, of good memory, king of Aragon, son, by the grace of God, count of Ribagorza and of Empúries"

When Peter IV succeeded Alfonso IV in 1336, Peter of Ribagorza presented him with a Latin mirror for princes entitled De vita, moribus et regimine principum. He became one of the young king's most influential counsellors, drawing him away from the influence of Archbishop Pedro López de Luna.

Early in the reign, Peter acted as a peacemaker. When Peter IV was on the verge of open conflict with his stepmother, Eleanor of Castile, over the rights of his half-brothers, Ferdinand and John, it was the Count of Ribagorza who dissuaded him from invading Castile, where they had taken refuge, and from attacking Pere de Xèrica, Eleanor's ally.

In May 1331, Peter married Joan, daughter of Count Gaston I of Foix, in Castelló in his County of Empúries. In 1341, he exchanged Empúries with his brother Ramon Berenguer for the Mountains of Prades. Within his new county, in the place then called Les Fonts del Perelló, he founded the coastal hospital today known as L'Hospitalet de l'Infant on 8 November 1344. The town of Vandellòs i l'Hospitalet de l'Infant arose around the hospital. With Prades, Peter also acquired the barony of Entença. He was also appointed seneschal of the Principality of Catalonia.

Although he advocated peace, Peter took an active part in Peter IV's conquest of Majorca (1343–1349). He participated in the invasion of Mallorca in 1343, the invasion of Roussillon in 1343–1344 and the defence of Cerdagne and Conflent from the counter-invasion of James III in 1347. In 1353, his daughter Eleanor married Peter, heir to the Cypriot throne. In 1354–1356, he served as head of the regency council during Peter IV's expedition to Sardinia. He tried to prevent the War of the Two Peters between Peter IV and King Peter of Castile. On 20 August 1356, the king wrote to him ordering him to raise cavalry for two months' service on the frontier. In 1356–1357, he defended the Kingdom of Valencia against a Castilian invasion.

== Franciscan friar ==
When Joan died in 1358, Peter made his will (dated 10 November 1358), renounced his counties in favour of his sons and entered the Franciscan convent of Barcelona (12 November). His decision to join the Franciscans greatly enhanced that order's standing in the Crown of Aragon. His retirement from worldly affairs, however, was only partial.

In 1364–1365, with Peter IV unable to leave Aragon, the Franciscan left his convent to assist Peter IV's young son, the future John I, in the defence of Valencia against a Castilian invasion. Using his contacts at Avignon, the Franciscan helped arrange in 1365 for the free company of soldiers under Bertrand du Guesclin, the so-called White Company, to assist Count Henry of Trastámara in his revolt against Peter of Castile.

Peter's final years were occupied by his great concern for the peace and unity of the church. He was highly regarded in the papal curia. He penned his Revelations, a prophetic tract in a Joachimite vein and influenced by Jean de Roquetaillade, in an effort to end the "Babylonian captivity" of the papacy in Avignon. He was forced to defend his work before Pope Urban V in Avignon, but it was condemned in 1365. It was during this stay at Avignon that he met Francesc Eiximenis.

In 1369, Peter's son-in-law, King Peter of Cyprus, was assassinated. In June 1371, Pope Gregory XI wrote to John of Lusignan, the regent for Peter's grandson, King Peter II, informing him that the elder Peter was on his way to Cyprus and that the crown should pay his expenses. The pope also ordered the Knights of Rhodes to render Peter assistance. There is, however, no record confirming that Peter of Ribagorza ever got to Cyprus or played any role in his grandson's minority. He was certainly at the papal curia in February 1373, when his daughter sent John Laskaris Kalopheros there to convey a message to him. In August, Alfonso Ferrand was also instructed to bring a message to Peter. Eleanor sought through Peter to gain papal support for the Genoese intervention that would unseat the regent. Eleanor's machinations involving her father were recorded by Leontios Makhairas.

During the Western Schism that resulted in 1378, Peter broke with the king of Aragon and openly supported the Roman pope, Urban VI. The future John I, using secret channels, managed to block Urban from making Peter a cardinal in 1380. Peter testified in support of Urban at the assembly of Medina del Campo in Castile. He died at Pisa on 4 November 1381 while on his way to Rome. He was buried in the local Franciscan convent, but his body was moved to the convent of Valencia in 1391.

== Children ==
By his marriage to Joan, Peter had four children:

- Alfonso, who inherited Ribagorza and later became duke of Gandia
- John, who inherited Prades, Entença and the seneschalcy of Catalonia and was a candidate for the Aragonese crown before the Compromise of Caspe
- James, who became a bishop of Tortosa (1362–1369), bishop of Valencia (1369–1396) and later a cardinal
- Eleanor, who married King Peter I of Cyprus

== Bibliography ==
- Aurell, Jaume (2020). Medieval Self-Coronations: The History and Symbolism of a Ritual. Cambridge University Press.
- Badia, Lola; Grifoll, Isabel (2017). "Language: From the Countryside to the Royal Court". In Flocel Sabaté (ed.). The Crown of Aragon: A Singular Mediterranean Empire. Brill. pp. 361–386.
- Beauchamp, Alexandra (2005). "De l'action à l'écriture: le De regimine principum de l'infant Pierre d'Aragon (v. 1357–1358)". Anuario de Estudios Medievales. 35 (1): 233–270. doi:10.3989/aem.2005.v35.i1.140. S2CID 153703896.
- Blumenfeld-Kosinski, Renate (2006). Poets, Saints, and Visionaries of the Great Schism, 1378–1417. The Penn State University Press.
- Conejo da Pena, Antoni, ed. (2015). L'infant Pere d'Aragó i d'Anjou: «molt graciós e savi senyor». Ajuntament de Vandellós i Cossetània and L'Hospitalet de l'Infant Edicions.
- Cura Curà, Giulio (2005). "Il «Doctrinal de trobar» di Raimon de Cornet e il «Glosari» di Johan de Castellnou". Parola del Testo. 9 (1): 125–149.
- Edbury, Peter W. (1994). Kingdom of Cyprus and the Crusades. Cambridge University Press.
- Elcacho, Albert Martínez; Yeguas i Gassó, Joan (2016). "Un Encàrrec de l'infant Pere d'Aragó i d'Anjou a Ferrer Bassa el 1346: el Saltiri anglocatalà". Miscel·lània litúrgica catalana. 23 (23): 63–92. doi:10.2436/20.1002.01.7.
- Faci, Guillermo Tomás (2023). El infante Pedro, conde de Ribagorza (1322–1358). Edicions Universitat Barcelona.
- Hinojosa Montalvo, José; Salrach Marés, Josep María (2018). "Aragón, Pedro de". Diccionario biográfico español. Real Academia de la Historia.
- Kagay, Donald J.; Villalon, L. J. Andrew (2021). Conflict in Fourteenth-Century Iberia: Aragon vs. Castile and the War of the Two Pedros. Brill.
- Olivar Bertrand, Rafael (1952). "Un capítulo de la política matrimonial de los Papas: Juan XXII se opone al enlace del Infante don Pedro, conde de Ribagorza y de Ampurias con doña Constanza, Reina de Chipre (1325–1331)". Cuadernos de Historia de España. 18: 71–129.
- Silleras-Fernandez, Nuria (2015). Chariots of Ladies: Francesc Eiximenis and the Court Culture of Medieval and Early Modern Iberia. Cornell University Press.
- Webster, Jill Rosemary (1993). Els Menorets: The Franciscans in the Realms of Aragon from St. Francis to the Black Death. Pontifical Institute of Mediaeval Studies.
