= Isabella of Ibelin =

Isabella of Ibelin may refer to:

- Isabella of Ibelin, Queen of Cyprus and Jerusalem (1241–1324), wife of Hugh III of Cyprus
- Isabella of Beirut (1252–1282), wife of Hugh II of Cyprus
- Isabella of Ibelin (died 1315), wife of Guy of Ibelin
