= Valentina Visconti =

Valentina Visconti is the name of:

- Valentina Visconti, Duchess of Orléans (1371–1408)
- Valentina Visconti, Queen of Cyprus (c. 1357–before September 1393)
