= Baldwin of Ibelin (disambiguation) =

Baldwin of Ibelin (died 1186×88) was an important noble of the crusader Kingdom of Jerusalem.

Baldwin of Ibelin may also refer to:

- Baldwin of Ibelin, Seneschal of Cyprus (died 1267)
- Baldwin of Ibelin, bailli of Jerusalem (died after 1286)
- Baldwin of Ibelin (died 1313), Crusader lord of Korakou
