= Henry II of Brunswick-Grubenhagen =

Duke of Brunswick-Luneburg, Prince of Grubenhagen

Coat-of-arms of Brunswick-Lüneburg

Henry II, Duke of Brunswick-Lüneburg, (before 1296 – after 1351), also called de Graecia ("of Greece"), was the eldest son of Henry I, Duke of Brunswick-Lüneburg and Agnes of Meissen.

On their father's death in 1322, his sons agreed to rule the Principality of Grubenhagen jointly; but they finally divided up the territory, and Henry did not receive a part, and instead took over the administration of the brothers' joint property.

In 1327, Henry joined Louis IV, Holy Roman Emperor, when Louis traveled to Rome for his coronation. Henry continued to travel to Greece and Constantinople, visiting his brother-in-law Emperor Andronikos III Palaiologos, and on to Jerusalem. Loaded with relics, he returned home in 1331. Apart from his travels, little is known about his life. Those of his sons who did not join the church obtained careers in southern European kingdoms; most notably Otto, who married Queen Joanna I of Naples.

== Family ==
Firstly, Henry married Jutta (bef. 1302 – bef. 1330), daughter of Henry I, Margrave of Brandenburg-Stendal. They had the following children:

- Agnes (c. 1318 – bef. 2 June 1371), married Barnim III, Duke of Pomerania
- Otto (1320 – 13 May 1399), married, firstly, Violante of Vilaragut, titular Dowager Queen of Majorca, and. secondly. Queen Joanna I of Naples
- John (c. 1321 – aft. 4 December 1346), canon of Halberstadt
- Louis (c. 1323 – aft. 26 May 1373), canon of Cammin

Secondly, Henry married Heloise (a.k.a. Helwig or Helvis; died 1347/48), daughter of Philip of Ibelin, Seneschal of Cyprus. They had the following children:

- Philip (c. 1332 – 4 August 1369/70), Constable of Jerusalem; married, firstly, Helisia de Dampierre (they were the parents of Helvis of Brunswick-Grubenhagen) and, secondly, Alix of Ibelin
- Riddag (c. 1334 – 1364/67)
- Balthazar (c. 1336 – aft. 14 January 1384), Despot of Romania, married Giacobella Caetani di Fondi
- Thomas (c. 1338 – c. 1384), joined the Augustinians
- Melchior (c. 1341 – 6 June 1381), Bishop of Osnabrück and Schwerin
- Helvis, married Louis de Nores

Henry II of Brunswick-Grubenhagen House of Welf Cadet branch of the House of Este Born: about 1289 Died: 1351
German nobility
Preceded by Henry I the Admirable	Duke of Brunswick-Lüneburg; Prince of Grubenhagen joint reign with his brothers Ernest I and William; 1322–1325	Succeeded by Ernest I
Retention of a condiminium on partitioning Grubenhagen	Lord over Grubenhagen condominium joint rule with his brothers Ernest I and William; 1325–1351	Succeeded by Ernest I and William
Minor Grubenhagen share disentangled from main territory	Duke of Brunswick-Lüneburg; Prince of minor Grubenhagen; 1325–1351	Reverted to Ernest I
