= Battle of Tripoli (1367) =

- Part of the Crusades
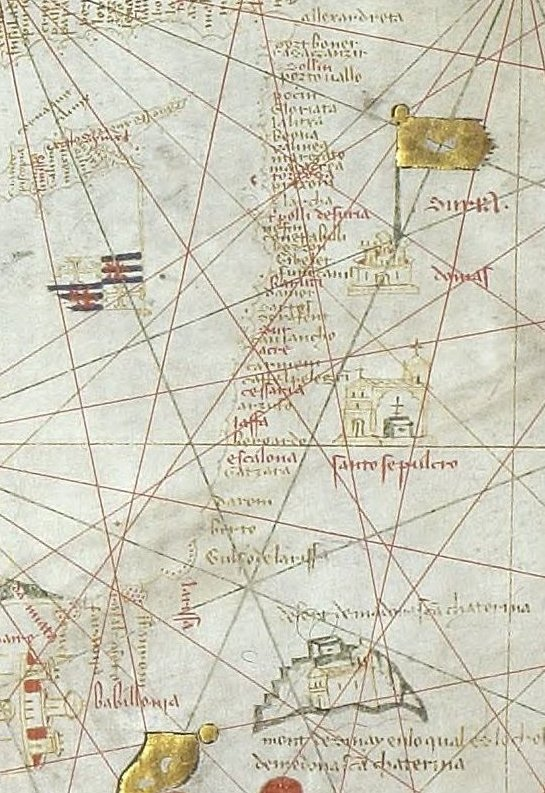
- Map of Levant in 14th century
Date	28 September 1367
Location	Tripoli, Lebanon
Result	Mamluk victory

Belligerents
Kingdom of Cyprus; Republic of Genoa (Sovereign Military Order of Malta) Knights Hospitaller	Mamluk Sultanate

Commanders and leaders
Peter I of Cyprus	Emir Idmor

Strength
140 or 160 ships 7,000 men	Unknown

Casualties and losses
1,000 killed (Muslim sources); 300 killed or captured (Christian sources)	40 killed (Muslim sources)

The Battle of Tripoli was a military engagement between the Crusaders of Cyprus and the Mamluk garrison of Tripoli, Lebanon. The Crusaders were initially victorious, entering the city and sacking it. However, the Mamluks repelled the attack, ending the raid in a fiasco.

== Background ==
After the sack of Alexandria by the Cypriot king, Peter I, the king made preparations for another Crusade against Beirut. The Venetians, however, persuaded the king to stop attacking the Mamluk Sultan and promised to repay him the money spent on his campaigns. The king agreed and began dispatching gifts to the Mamluk Sultan, Al-Ashraf Sha'ban, hoping to conclude a peace treaty. Both sides engaged in peace talks until the king agreed to release the Muslim captives taken from Alexandria.

Peace talks soon stopped as the Mamluk Sultan believed that European kings had stopped aiding the Cypriot king in his campaigns and that no further peace talks were necessary since the captives returned to him. Peter felt he had been tricked and blamed the Venetians for the peace talks. He then resumed the war. The war council of the king decided to attack the city of Tripoli, Lebanon. The king prepared a large armada of 140 or 160 ships carrying 7,000 men, including Crusaders from Genoa, France, England, and Knights Hospitallers from Rhodes who served as royal guards of the king.

== Battle ==
The Crusader armada departed Famagusta on September 27, 1367. Peter sailed towards Tripoli and arrived there the next day late at night. The city was strongly garrisoned and led by a high-ranking emir, Idmor, who was absent at the time of the attack. The Crusaders attacked the city from above and below the city with success. The men who had been left in charge of the ships went ashore and began attacking with their yelling. Seeing this, the Mamluk garrison evacuated the town, allowing the Crusaders to enter. They began sacking and destroying the city.

While at their sacking, the Muslims rallied together and suddenly attacked the Crusaders. A fierce fight began during which the Muslims routed the Crusaders out of the town. The king ordered a retreat to the ships. The retreat was in disorder, and the Muslims began attacking them. The Mamluks used the far distance between the ships and the city to ambush and kill many of the Crusaders. The king had difficulty re-embarking his troops, and the majority of the plunder was lost to the Muslims. During this fiasco, the Crusaders lost 300 men killed or captured, according to Christian sources while Muslim sources state they killed 1,000 of them, losing 40 in return. Among those who were killed was the Hospitaller Turcopole, William de Middleton, who was killed in the battle. The Crusaders captured the iron gate of Tripoli.

== Aftermath ==
The Crusaders raided other towns on the coast, including Tartus and Latakia. The Crusaders returned to Cyprus on October 5. His crusade against Tripoli failed, losing many men and plunder, which he wanted to use to pay debts to Cypriot priests. The Crusade ended in creating hostilities between the two nations. From 1367 to 1368, Peter visited Italian cities including Rome, Venice, Pisa, and Florence, hoping to gain support for a crusade. In 1369, Peter was murdered by disaffected Cypriot barons.

== Sources ==
- Ashour, Said (1957). Cyprus and the Crusades (in Arabic). pp. 71–77.
- Hill, George (1948). A History Of Cyprus, Volume II, The Frankish Period, 1192-1432. Cambridge University Press. pp. 352–353.
- Abercrombie, Gordon Ellyson (2024). The Hospitaller Knights of Saint John at Rhodes 1306-1522. Pen and Sword Military. ISBN 9781399048002.
