= James I of Cyprus =

King of Cyprus from 1382 to 1398

James I
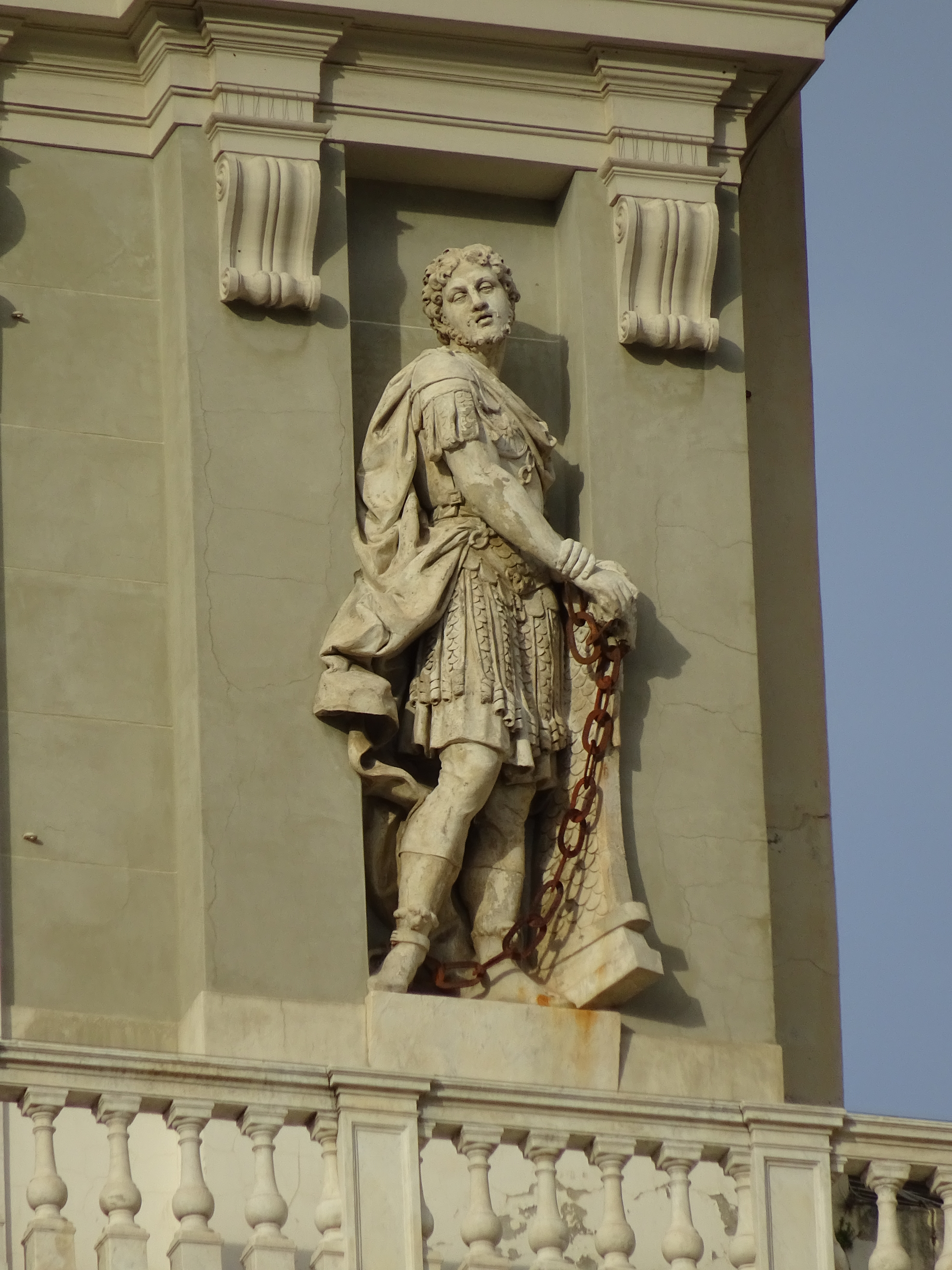

King of Cyprus
- Reign: 13 October 1382 – 9 September 1398
- Predecessor: Peter II
- Successor: Janus
- Born: 1334
- Died: 9 September 1398; Nicosia
- Spouse: Agnes of Bavaria (uncertain); Helvis of Brunswick-Grubenhagen
- Issue among others...: Janus, King of Cyprus; Philip, Constable of Cyprus; Henry, Prince of Galilee; Hugh, Patriarch of Jerusalem; Guy, Constable of Cyprus; Mary, Queen of Naples
- House: Poitiers-Lusignan
- Father: Hugh IV
- Mother: Alix of Ibelin

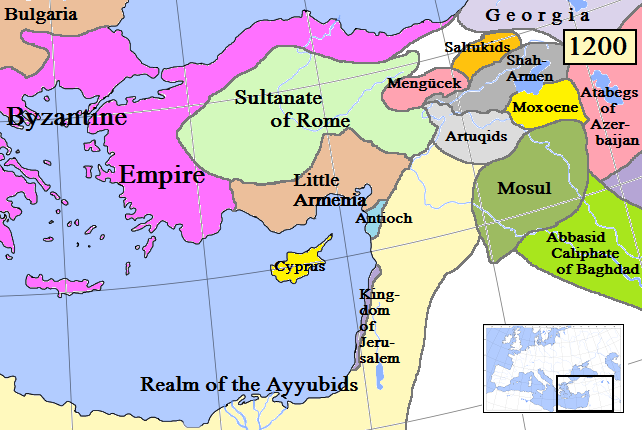
The kingdoms of Cyprus, Jerusalem, Little Armenia and other surrounding states in 1200 AD.

James I (French: Jacques de Lusignan; 1334 – September 9, 1398) was the youngest son of King Hugh IV of Cyprus and by 1369 held the title "Constable of Jerusalem." When his nephew Peter II died in 1382, he became King of Cyprus. James was also crowned King of Jerusalem in 1389 and assumed the title of King of Armenia in 1393, which was formally given to him in 1396.

James was the third son of Hugh IV of Cyprus and his second wife, Alix of Ibelin. His older half-brother was Guy, Prince of Galilee (1320–1343), and his two brothers were Peter I, King of Cyprus (1328–1369), and John of Lusignan, Prince of Antioch (1329–1375). Before becoming king, James had other offices and was known for his resistance against the Genoese invasion of Cyprus.

== Nobleman ==
When his father King Hugh IV died in 1359, his eldest brother, Peter I, took the throne and reigned for 10 years, until he was murdered in 1369. Peter's heir, his only son, Peter II, was about 14 at that time. James's second brother, John, titular Prince of Antioch, Constable of Cyprus, as the eldest living son of Hugh IV, was regent for three years during the minority of Peter II, who was crowned in January 1372. During the regency, Peter I's widow Eleanor of Aragon, to avenge her husband's murder, invited the Genoese to invade Cyprus.

Since the Genoese had commercial and financial interests in Cyprus that they wanted to protect and exploit, they invaded the island in April 1373. After taking over the well-fortified city of Famagusta, they arrested and held Peter II and his mother Eleanor, who had invited them, captive. After they killed the nobles who had murdered Peter I, they wanted to take control of the island. After the end of the war, in 1375, Eleanor succeeded in arranging the murder of her husband's brother John of Lusignan, Prince of Antioch (the former regent), whom she claimed she was responsible for her husband's murder. James, the other brother, was also said to be among the party that murdered Peter I, but by this time he was in prison in Genoa.

James was made Constable of Jerusalem, the second in command, while his elder brother was made Constable of Cyprus, the highest military position, and in that office led the resistance against the invasion by the Genoese in 1373.

Both James and his brother John resisted the invasion. James fought well in command of forces in Kyrenia, successfully resisting this attack. However, King Peter II, signed a treaty with the Genoese, who kept Famagusta. According to the treaty, James had to leave Cyprus. The Genoese considered him their chief opponent in Cyprus. In 1374 he left the island on a ship from Kyrenia. The ship was forced to stop at Rhodes, and there he was arrested by the Genoese and taken as a captive to Genoa, together with his wife. Their young daughter died, either in Rhodes or Genoa. Their first son, Janus, was born in that city in 1375. In Genoa he lived with his wife under difficult circumstances as a prisoner for 9 years. Many of their other children were probably also born in Genoa.

== King ==
After Peter II's death without an heir in 1382, the Parliament of Cyprus decided on James to be the king, while he was still held captive in Genoa. The Genoese, before they would agree to release him to go back to Cyprus, negotiated with him to receive new privileges for commercial activities, and they received his signature on an "extortionate" agreement on February 2, 1383. Famagusta remained under Genoese control, something that was never accepted by either James and other kings after him. During his reign he tried to regain that city.

While awaiting James's return from prison, the Kingdom of Cyprus was governed by a regency council of 12 nobles. After he signed the agreement to the terms of release in 1383, he and his wife returned to Genoa in the custody of the Genoese, but in the meantime, a number of nobles objected to these terms and sought a different monarch. Among them were the brothers Perot and Wilmot de Montolif. Perot privately encouraged the widow of Peter II, Valentina Visconti, to take over the island, but publicly he supported her daughter Mariette or Margaret. The Montolif brothers may have had private ambitions to marry into the royal family. When James arrived in Cyprus, many people refused to accept his kingship. James, who at this time held the title of Constable of Cyprus, ordered two defenseless towns burned when the inhabitants, in fear of the rebellious nobles, did not give their allegiance to him as their sovereign. The Montolif brothers were sent by the rebellious nobles to try to negotiate better terms for James's release from the Genoese, without cost to Cyprus, but they failed, and they refused the terms of the agreement James had already signed. James's escorts from Genoa were unable to complete their mission according to the terms of the agreement, and the time limit they had been given ran out. They returned him to Genoa. The nobles could not be persuaded to accept James until 1385. In April 1385, leaving his son Janus in prison in Genoa as a hostage, James again returned to Cyprus and went to Nicosia, where he was welcomed with great enthusiasm. He was crowned in May 1385 in Saint Sophia Cathedral by Paul Palaiologos Tagaris. After his crowning, his opponents were arrested and punished. The Montolif brothers were executed. He imposed a tax to raise funds to ransom his son. This was accomplished more than seven years after his coronation, in December 1392.

James I was crowned King of Jerusalem in 1389. In 1393, King Leo V of Armenia died, and James assumed the title of King of Armenia, which was formally given to him in 1396. That kingdom was by now reduced to the city of Korikos, which had been in Cypriot hands since its conquest by Peter I of Cyprus. He died in Nicosia in 1398.

== Marriages and issue ==
According to some sources, James married Agnes of Bavaria (b. 1338), daughter of Duke Stephen II of Bavaria from his first wife Elisabeth of Sicily. This marriage, assuming it was real, took place before James married his well known wife Helvis of Brunswick-Grubenhagen about 1365.

James married his kinswoman Helvis (1353 – January 15/25, 1421) (daughter of Philip of Brunswick-Grubenhagen, Constable of Jerusalem and Helisia of Dampierre) in 1365. Her brother John of Brunswick-Grubenhagen (d. June 11, 1414 unmarried and without issue) was an Admiral of Cyprus and their father Philip of Brunswick-Grubenhagen (c. 1332 – August 4, 1369/1370) was a Constable of the Kingdom of Jerusalem.

James and Heloise of Brunswick-Grubenhagen, had twelve children:

- Janus of Lusignan (1375–1432), who succeeded him as king
- Philip of Lusignan (d. c. 1430 or 1428/1432), Constable of Cyprus
- Henry of Lusignan (d. July 7, 1426), titular Prince of Galilee, a military leader in Egypt, killed in action at Khirokitia, married c. 1406 his cousin Eleanor of Lusignan (d. c. 1414), granddaughter of Jean de Lusignan and second wife Alix of Ibelin, without issue, and had three natural children
- Eudes/Odo of Lusignan (d. 1421 in Palermo), Titular Seneschal of Jerusalem, in the service of the King of Aragon, (probably) married after March 19, 1406, his cousin Loysia de Lusignan, granddaughter of Jean de Lusignan and second wife Alix d'Ibelin, without issue.
- Hugh of Lusignan (d. August, 1442 in Geneva), Regent of Cyprus and Cardinal Archbishop of Nicosia
- Guy of Lusignan, Constable of Cyprus, unmarried and without issue
- An unknown daughter de Lusignan (d. 1374 in Rhodes), died young
- Jacqua of Lusignan (d. c. 1397 or 1396/1398), unmarried and without issue
- Eschiva of Lusignan (d. after 1406), probably married to Count Sclavus von Asperg
- Mary of Lusignan (1381 in Genoa – September 4, 1404 in Naples and buried there), married Ladislaus "le Magnanime", King of Naples and Jerusalem, Hungary and Dalmatia (July 14, 1376/February 11, 1377 in Naples
- Agnes of Lusignan (c. 1382 – March 1, 1459 in Venasco), Abbess of Wunstorf
- Isabella of Lusignan, c. 1415 married Peter of Lusignan, titular Count of Tripoli

Upon his death, his son Janus succeeded to the throne.

== Sources ==
- Hill, George (2010). A History of Cyprus. Vol. 3: The Frankish Period, 1432–1571. Cambridge University Press. ISBN 978-1-108-02064-0.

Regnal titles
Preceded by Peter II	King of Cyprus; 1382–1398	Succeeded by Janus
Preceded by Peter II	— TITULAR — King of Jerusalem; 1382–1398	Succeeded by Janus
Preceded by Leo VI	King of Armenian Cilicia; 1393–1398	Succeeded by Janus
