= Philip of Brunswick-Grubenhagen =

Constable of Jerusalem (c. 1332–1369/70)

Philip

Constable of Jerusalem
- Reign: c. 1359?
- Predecessor: Amalric (1285–1300)
- Successor: Peter of Lusignan (c. 1415?)
- Born: c. 1332
- Died: 4 August 1369/1370
- Spouse: Helisia de Dampierre; Alix of Ibelin
- Issue: Helvis
- House: Welf
- Father: Henry II
- Mother: Heloise of Ibelin

Philip of Brunswick-Grubenhagen (c. 1332 – 4 August 1369/1370) was Constable of Jerusalem. He belongs to the House of Welf.

== Life ==
He was son of Henry II, Duke of Brunswick-Grubenhagen called de Graecia and his second wife Heloise (Helwig, Helvis), daughter of Philip of Ibelin, Seneschal of Jerusalem. His father was the first son of Henry I, Duke of Brunswick-Lüneburg and his sons could succeed him in Grubenhagen, but four of them joined the church and the rest three obtained careers far away: Otto married Joanna I of Naples, Philip became Constable of Jerusalem and Balthazar entitled despot of Romania. Additionally they had no male offspring, thus the principality of Grubenhagen remained to Ernest I, Duke of Brunswick-Grubenhagen, younger brother of Henry II.

Philip was nephew of Adelheid of Brunswick, wife of Andronikos III Palaiologos the Roman Emperor.

== Marriage and issue ==
He married firstly Helisia de Dampierre and had 2 children:

- Helvis of Brunswick-Grubenhagen (1353–1421) married James I of Cyprus (son of Alix of Ibelin and Hugh IV of Cyprus). Helvis and James I had 12 children: Janus of Cyprus, Mary of Lusignan Queen of Naples and others.
- John of Brunswick-Grubenhagen (died 11 June 1414), Admiral of Cyprus.

Secondly he married Alix of Ibelin, the widow of Hugh IV of Cyprus. Because of the close relation, a Papal dispensation had been required for the marriage. There were no children from his 2nd marriage.

== Coat of arms ==
of his father duke of Brunswick-Lüneburg-Grubenhagen

of his 1st wife Helisia de Dampierre

of his 2nd wife Alice d' Ibelin

of Jerusalem, where Philip was Constable

of Philip's son-in-law, James I of Cyprus
