= Assembly of Medina del Campo =

From November 1380 until April 1381, an assembly of clergy of the Crown of Castile met in Medina del Campo to discuss the ongoing Western Schism and decide which claimant to the papacy Castile should support. This period of uncertainty, the indiferencia, was characteristic of the Spanish kingdoms in response to the schism. Following the assembly, Castile declared for Clement VII on 19 May.

The assembly was convoked by King John I of Castile for 23 November and was opened on that day by Juan García Manríquez, the bishop of Sigüenza, who presided. The king did not attend the opening in person, although many lay magnates did. Both papal claimants, Clement VII and Urban VI, sent representatives. Experts in law, canon law and theology were present, as well as foreign diplomats, notaries and a host of support staff. The expenses of the assembly were paid for by the king.

Cardinal Pedro de Luna spoke first in defence of Clement followed by Francesco Uguccione on behalf of Urban. The king arrived on 26 November to hear his own ambassador, Ruy Bernal. Among the witnesses from whom the assembly heard were Raymond of Capua, Peter of Ribagorza and Gilles de Bellemère. The only female witness was Catherine of Vadstena. The assembly created commissions to investigate specific points.

== Sources ==
- Blumenfeld-Kosinski, Renate (2006). Poets, Saints, and Visionaries of the Great Schism, 1378–1417. The Penn State University Press.
- Serra Estellés, Xavier (2010). "El Cisma de Occidente y la Asamblea de Medina del Campo de 1380–1381 en el Ms. lat. 11745 de la Biblioteca Nacional de Francia" (PDF). Anthologica Annua. 57: 33–303.
