= Guy of Ibelin (1286–1308) =

Seneschal of Cyprus

- Lord of Nicosia
- The Ibelin coat of arms
- Born: 1286 or c. 1286
- Died: 1308 (aged 21–22)
- Buried: Abbey of Bellapais near Kyrenia
- Noble family: House of Ibelin
- Spouse: Isabella of Ibelin
- Issue: Alix of Ibelin
- Father: Balian of Ibelin
- Mother: Alice of Lampron

Guy of Ibelin (1286 or c. 1286 – 8 September 1308), Lord of Nicosia, was the son of Balian of Ibelin, Seneschal of the Kingdom of Cyprus, and wife Alice of Lampron.

In 1303, with papal dispensation, Guy married his cousin Isabella of Ibelin (?–1315), daughter of Baldwin of Ibelin, Lord of Korakou and Margaret Embriaco of Giblet.

Their only children were:

- Alix of Ibelin, second wife of Hugh IV of Cyprus
- Margaret of Ibelin (1307–?), married with dispensation on 13 November 1319 to Guy of Ibelin, seneschal of Cyprus.

Guy was buried on September 8, 1308 in the Premonstratensian Abbey of Bellapais near Kyrenia, Cyprus.

== Sources ==
- Amadi, Francesco (1891), Chroniques d'Amadi et de Strambaldi (publiées par M. René de Mas)
- Mas Latrie, Louis de (1881), Généalogie des rois de Chypre de la famille de Lusignan
- Du Cange, Charles D. (1972), Familles D'Outre-Mer, Ayer Publishing, ISBN 0-8337-0932-1
- Hill, George Francis (1940). A History of Cyprus: The Frankish Period, 1432-1571. Cambridge at the University Press.1052
- Rüdt de Collenberg, W. H. (1977), "Les Ibelin aux XIIIe et XIVe siècles", Επετηρίς Κέντρου Επιστημονικών Ερευνών Κύπρου, 9
- Nielen-Vandervoorde, Marie-Adélaïde (2003), Lignages d'Outremer, Documents relatifs à l'histoire des Croisades, Académie des Inscriptions et Belles-Lettres, ISBN 2-87754-141-X
- L. de Mas Latrie, "Généalogie des rois de Chypre"
- Runciman, Steven (1999). A History of the Crusades. Vol. III: The Kingdom of Acre and the Later Crusades. Cambridge University Press.
