= Valentina Visconti, Queen of Cyprus =

Valentina Visconti

Queen consort of Cyprus
- Tenure: 1378–1382
- Born: c. 1357; Milan, Italy
- Died: Before September 1393 (aged 36); Cyprus
- Spouse: Peter II of Cyprus (m. 1376; died 1382)
- House: Visconti
- Father: Bernabò Visconti
- Mother: Beatrice Regina della Scala

Valentina Visconti (c. 1357 – before September 1393) was Queen consort of Cyprus and titular Queen consort of Jerusalem by marriage to Peter II of Cyprus. She was the daughter of Bernabò Visconti and Beatrice Regina della Scala.

== Life ==
Valentina was born in Milan and was the eleventh of seventeen children of Bernabo Visconti and Beatrice Regina della Scala.

=== Queen of Cyprus ===
In 1363, King Peter I of Cyprus was visiting Milan, Valentina's father Bernabò promised Peter that his daughter would marry Peter's son the future Peter II of Cyprus. The first choice of Peter's marriage would have been to a daughter of John V Palaiologos; this suggestion was rejected for political reasons, since the Latins did not encourage the marriage of Peter to a Greek princess. The justification given to the Palaiologos messengers was that the Peter I was busy with the dangers that threatened Cyprus because of the Genoese invasion of the island.

In 1373, Valentina was about to leave to Milan for Cyprus to marry Peter, but the wedding had to be postponed because of fighting between Cyprus and the Genoese.

In September 1377, the marriage was performed by proxy. Valentina left Milan the following year.

Valentina and Peter had one daughter who died at the age of two in Nicosia in 1382.

It is known that Valentina did not get along with her mother-in-law Eleanor of Aragon due to her being involved in many issues and scandals. To prevent more problems between the two Peter sent Eleanor back to her homeland of Catalonia.

=== Widowhood ===
On 13 October 1382, Valentina was widowed. She quarrelled with her mother-in-law, eventually expelling her from court. After her husband died, she attempted to seize the crown of Cyprus for herself. Her death is reported in a letter from Queen Helvis of Cyprus to the Duke of Milan which arrived 12 September 1393.

Preceded by Eleanor of Aragon	Queen consort of Cyprus; 1378–1382	Succeeded by Helvis of Brunswick-Grubenhagen
