= Baldwin of Ibelin (died 1313) =

- Coat-of-arms of Ibelin

Lord of Korakou and Vitzada
- Died: 1313
- Noble family: House of Ibelin
- Spouse: Marguerite Embriaco de Giblet
- Issue: Isabella
- Father: John of Ibelin (died after 1250)
- Mother: Isabelle du Rivet

Baldwin of Ibelin (French: Baudouin d'Ibelin; died 1313) was the ruling Lord of Korakou and of Vitzada, son of John of Ibelin (died after 1250) and Isabelle du Rivet.

== Family ==
He married Marguerite de Giblet and they had :

- Isabella of Ibelin († 1315), who married her cousin Guy of Ibelin (1286 † 1308).
