= Alice of Ibelin =

Queen consort of Cyprus (1304/1306–1386)

Queen consort of Cyprus
- Tenure: 31 March 1324–24 November 1358
- Coronation: 15 April 1324
- Born: 1304/1306; Cyprus
- Died: after 6 August 1386
- Burial: Saint Dominic's, Nicosia
- Spouse: King Hugh IV of Cyprus; Philip of Brunswick-Grubenhagen
- Issue: Eschive de Lusignan; King Peter I of Cyprus; John of Lusignan; King James I of Cyprus; Thomas de Lusignan; Marguerite de Luisgnan; Isabelle de Lusignan
- House: Ibelin
- Father: Guy of Ibelin
- Mother: Isabelle of Ibelin

Alice of Ibelin (1304/1306 – after 6 August 1386), was Queen consort of Cyprus and nominal Queen consort of Jerusalem as the second wife of King Hugh IV of Cyprus. She was queen from 31 March 1324 until Hugh's abdication on 24 November 1358. Two of her sons, Peter and James reigned as kings of Cyprus.

== Life ==
Alice was born in Cyprus sometime between 1304 and 1306, the only child of Guy of Ibelin, Lord of Nicosia and Isabelle of Ibelin. The House of Ibelin were a much-intermarried French noble family which had featured prominently in the Crusader states of Jerusalem and Cyprus since the 12th century.

Alice lost her father when she was a small child and her mother died in 1315, when Alice was no older than 11 years.

In 1310, she was betrothed to Henry of Lusignan, the son of Amalric, Lord of Tyre. The betrothal was annulled that same year when Almaric was murdered and his family sought refuge in Armenia.

=== Queen of Cyprus ===
On 17 September 1318, Alice married Hugh of Lusignan, son and heir of Guy of Lusignan, constable of Cyprus. A papal dispensation, which was dated 18 June 1318, had been required. She was his second wife, as his first, her kinswoman Marie of Ibelin, had died before June 1318. That same year, Hugh succeeded his father as constable, and on 31 March 1324, Hugh succeeded his uncle, Henry II as King of Cyprus and titular King of Jerusalem. With Hugh's accession to the Cypriot throne, the most illustrious period of the Lusignan dynasty in Cyprus commenced. Alice was crowned Queen of Cyprus at her husband's coronation on 15 April 1324 at Saint Sophia Cathedral in Nicosia. Shortly after the double coronation, the cathedral was consecrated by the Latin archbishop, Jean del Conte. On 13 May at Famagusta, Hugh was crowned King of Jerusalem. The Chronicle of Amadi records that Alice had a small speech impediment which was cured by a miracle performed by the Holy Cross of Tochni which had been rediscovered in 1340.

=== Later life ===
King Hugh abdicated his throne on 24 November 1358 in favour of their son Peter. He died the following year. In 1368, Alice married secondly, Philip of Brunswick-Grubenhagen, Constable of Jerusalem, son of Henry II, Duke of Brunswick-Grubenhagen, who was the father of her daughter-in-law, Helvis. As in the case of her first marriage, another Papal dispensation had been required for her to marry Philip. He died a year later on 4 August 1369.

Alice died after 6 August 1386 and was buried in Saint Dominic's in Nicosia. Her great-granddaughter was Anne of Lusignan, wife of Louis, Duke of Savoy

== Issue ==
Together Alice and Hugh had:

- Eschive of Lusignan (1325 – March 1363), married Infante Fernando of Majorca, Viscount d'Omelas, by whom she had one daughter, Alicia of Majorca (1341 – after 1376).
- King Peter I of Cyprus (9 October 1328 – 16 January 1369), married firstly Eschive de Montfort; secondly Eleanor of Aragon-Gandia, by whom he had issue.
- John of Lusignan (1329/1330 – 1375), married firstly, Constance of Sicily, Queen of Cyprus; secondly, Alice of Ibelin, by whom he had one son.
- King James I of Cyprus (1334 – 9 September 1398), married Helvis of Brunswick-Grubenhagen, by whom he had 12 children, including King Janus of Cyprus, who reigned after him.
- Thomas of Lusignan (died 15 November 1340), unmarried.
- Margaret of Lusignan, married Galtier de Dampierre, Seneschal of Cyprus; died childless.
- Isabella of Lusignan, died without issue.

Alice had one stepson, Guy of Lusignan, by Hugh's first wife. Her husband also had an illegitimate son, Pierrot.

== Sources ==
- Hill, George (2010a). A History of Cyprus. Vol. 2. Cambridge University Press.
- Hill, George (2010b). A History of Cyprus. Vol. 3. Cambridge University Press.

Alice of Ibelin House of Ibelin Born: circa. 1304/1306 Died: after 6 August 1386
Royal titles
Preceded by Constance of Sicily	Queen consort of Cyprus; 1324–1358	Succeeded by Eleanor of Aragon
