= Hugues Lancelot de Lusignan =

Frankish Cardinal

Hugh Lancelot of Lusignan or Hugues or Hughues Lancelot de Lusignan (Note: Also known as Hugh of Lusignan, Ugo di Lusignano, Ugone di Lusignano, Lisinhac.) (died August 1442) was a cardinal. (Note: From 1426, with the title of Sant'Adriano al Foro; Bishop of Palestrina (1431-1436), Bishop of Frascati (1436-1442)) After his death he was known as the cardinal of Cyprus.

Hugh was the son of James I, king of Cyprus and Heloise of Brunswick. In 1409/1410, he was appointed the administrator of the Cypriot archbishopric, by his brother King Janus of Cyprus. By 1411, Hugh was confirmed by Antipope John XXIII which was followed by his appointment as archbishop of Cyprus in 1421 by Pope Martin V. He was made cardinal by Martin V in 1426. He was regent during the captivity of his brother, Janus of Cyprus until 1427.

In 1427, Hugh traveled to Rome as a representative for the Kingdom of Cyprus. He attended the Council of Basel in March 1434, and was an interpreter for the Byzantine ambassadors. In 1435 he presided over the Congress of Arras as an intermediary between France, Burgundy, and England.

He died at Geneva in August 1442.

== Sources ==
- Dickinson, Joycelyne Gledhill (1955). The Congress of Arras 1435: A Study in Medieval Diplomacy. Oxford University Press.
- Hill, George (2010). A History of Cyprus. Vol. 3: The Frankish Period, 1432–1571. Cambridge University Press. ISBN 978-1-108-02064-0.
- Richard, Jean (1989). "The Institutions of the Kingdom of Cyprus". In Hazard, Harry W.; Zacour, Norman P. (eds.). A History of the Crusades. Vol. VI: The Impact of the Crusades on Europe. The University of Wisconsin Press. ISBN 0-299-10740-X.
- Salzmann, Miriam Rachel (2021). Negotiating Power and Identities: Latin, Greek and Syrian Élites in Fifteenth-Century Cyprus. Römisch-Germanisches Zentralmuseum. ISBN 978-3-88467-340-9.
