= Hugh IV of Cyprus =

King of Cyprus from 1324 to 1358

Hugh IV

King of Cyprus
- Reign: 31 March 1324 – 24 November 1358
- Predecessor: Henry II
- Successor: Peter I
- Born: c. 1295
- Died: 10 October 1359
- Spouse: Maria of Ibelin; Alice of Ibelin
- Issue: Guy of Lusignan (died 1343); Eschiva; Peter I of Cyprus; John, regent of Cyprus; James I of Cyprus
- House: Poitiers-Lusignan
- Father: Guy, Constable of Cyprus
- Mother: Eschiva of Ibelin, Lady of Beirut

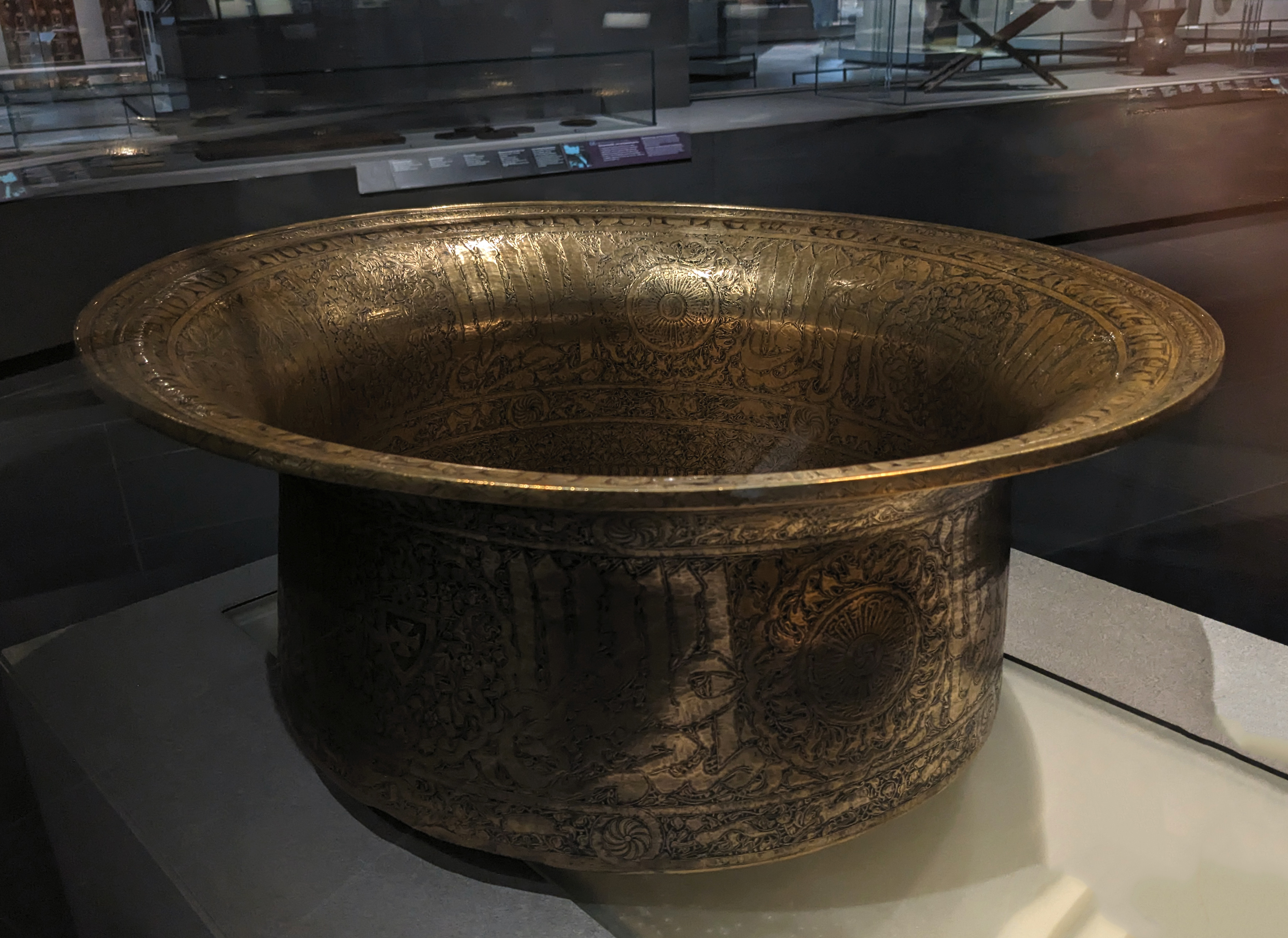
Basin with an inscription in Arabic that reads: "Made by the order of Hugh, favoured by God, the one at the vanguard of the elite troops of the Franks, Hugh of the Lusignans". Another inscription in French reads: "Très haut et puissant roi Hugues de Jherusalem et de Chipre que Dieu manteigne." ("Very high and powerful king Hugh of Jerusalem and Cyprus, may God maintain him"). 14th century, Egypt or Syria. Louvre Museum

Hugh IV (1293/1296 – 10 October 1359) was King of Cyprus from 31 March 1324 to his abdication on 24 November 1358, and nominally King of Jerusalem as Hugh II until his death. The son of Guy, constable of Cyprus (son of Hugh III of Cyprus), and Eschiva of Ibelin, Hugh succeeded his father as constable of Cyprus in 1318, and later succeeded to the throne of Cyprus on the death of his uncle Henry II, since Henry II had no sons. He was a member of the House of Poitiers-Lusignan.

The Kingdom of Cyprus reached the peak of its power and prosperity during the reigns of Hugh IV and Peter I.

== Youth ==
Hugh was the son of Guy, a brother of King Henry II of Cyprus, and Eschiva, a member of the Ibelin family who had lost her lordship of Beirut to the Egyptian Mamluks shortly before marrying Guy in 1291. Hugh was three years old when his father died and was raised in the household of his uncle, King Henry. In 1306 Henry was forced to relinquish effective power to the eldest of his brothers, Amalric, who was his heir presumptive. Amalric was found murdered in 1310, paving the way for Henry's restoration.

By the early 1310s, Henry was over forty, unmarried, and unlikely to have children. His last surviving brother, Aimery, in theory, stood to succeed him but was imprisoned for aiding Amalric from 1310 until his death in 1316. In 1318, Henry made Hugh the constable of Cyprus, as Guy had once been. Rather than any of the sons of his brothers Amalric and Guy, the eldest of King Henry's sisters, Maria, was the heir presumptive until her death in 1322. She and Henry were both married into the Aragonese royal family, but neither had children. By the end of his reign Henry probably intended, though there is no concrete evidence, to be succeeded by Hugh. Henry's surviving siblings, Alice and Helvis, however, had a stronger claim in law, as they were more closely related to Henry than Hugh was.

== Accession ==
On 31 March 1324, when King Henry died, a hurried assembly of liege men swore to protect Hugh's rights against any challengers. As Henry's only male relative remaining in the kingdom, Hugh was an obvious candidate to become the new king. Henry was buried on 1 April, and at the meeting of the High Court the next day, Hugh claimed the throne. His spokesman laid out arguments for a male successor, either misunderstanding or deliberately misrepresenting earlier precedents. The vassals accepted Hugh's claim in preference to his aunts Alice and Helvis. Hugh was crowned king of Cyprus on 15 April at the Cathedral of Saint Sophia in Nicosia. From Henry he also inherited the claim to the Kingdom of Jerusalem, the last piece of which had been lost to Muslims in 1291. Since the city of Tyre (in modern-day Lebanon), where the kings of Jerusalem were traditionally crowned, had also been conquered, Hugh received the crown of Jerusalem in Famagusta, deemed the best alternative by the vassals and the clergy. Hugh thus inaugurated a new custom among the Cypriot kings.

One of Hugh's first acts upon his accession was having the High Court declare the forfeiture of the fiefs of all the vassals who had resisted his predecessor's restoration. Henry had kept them imprisoned since 1318, but Hugh decided to confiscate their land and release them. His goal may have been depriving his uncle Amalric's supporters of means to plot on behalf of Amalric's sons. In 1325 Hugh attempted to heal the rift between his family, the Lusignans, and the Ibelins, who had opposed Henry, through arranged marriages.

== Dynastic policy ==
Hugh's first wife was Maria of Ibelin, daughter of Guy, the titular count of Jaffa. Hugh and Maria had a son, Guy. In 1318, after her death, Hugh obtained a papal dispensation to marry her distant kinswoman Alice of Ibelin, with whom he had at least eight children, of whom five reached adulthood. Having plenty of children enabled Hugh to forge dynastic links with Western European rulers, which his predecessors had little luck achieving.

In January 1330 Hugh had Guy marry Maria, daughter of Duke Louis I of Bourbon. Louis belonged to a cadet branch of the French Capetian dynasty and was thoroughly involved in the French plans for a crusade to recover the Holy Land. Hugh hoped that the marriage would strengthen his chances of gaining control over the Holy Land, especially against the claims of the Capetian House of Anjou, who had disputed the Lusignans' claim to the throne of Jerusalem since the 1270s. The outbreak of France's Hundred Years' War with England in 1337 put an end to Louis's hopes to lead a crusade. Guy began taking part in state affairs in the late 1330s and was made constable of Cyprus, but died in 1343.

Through three of his children Hugh reestablished the Cypriot ties to the royal family of Aragon, who ruled Aragon, Sardinia, Sicily, the Balearic Islands, and Athens through various branches and who shared the Lusignans' enmity with the Angevin kings of Naples and the Republic of Genoa. In 1337 a dispensation was obtained for the marriage of Hugh's daughter Eschiva to Ferdinand, a member of the Majorcan branch, and the marriage proceeded in 1340. Hugh and Ferdinand clashed so violently, however, apparently over Eschiva's dowry, that King Peter IV of Aragon and Pope Benedict XII both warned Hugh of Aragonese reprisals should Ferdinand be harmed. Benedict simultaneously directed Ferdinand to be more temperate and deferential to his father-in-law. Ferdinand recorded Hugh's slights and threats to him, violence against his household members, and attacks on the Franciscans. At some point after mid-1342, claiming to have been forcibly separated from her, Ferdinand left his wife and their daughter and moved back to Europe.

The second Aragonese match was secured in 1343, when Hugh's 12-year-old son John married Constance of Sicily, the 40-year-old widow of both Hugh's uncle Henry II and King Leo V of Armenia. Hugh may have hoped to salvage his relationship with the Aragonese as well as to save money by providing an income for John out of Constance's Cypriot and Armenian dowers. Constance died within a few years. The first marriage of Hugh's son Peter was likely also arranged with frugality in mind. By the time this wealthy and significantly older wife, Eschiva of Montfort, died, Peter was regarded as the heir apparent to the throne and his marriage could be used to further Hugh's interests in foreign affairs. Thus was concluded the third and most significant Aragonese union, Peter's marriage to Eleanor, daughter of Count Peter of Ribagorza, in 1353. Yet Hugh's dynastic matches, however valuable they were to him, proved that he was not equal to the kings of France and Aragon, for his children could not marry into the kings' immediate families.

== Personality ==
Hugh's reign is poorly recorded in historical sources and so he remains a little-known figure. Visitors to Cyprus thought him pious and just, but his son-in-law portrayed him as a vicious tyrant. This appears to be corroborated by Hugh's actions in 1349 when his sons Peter and John secretly and against his wishes left Cyprus for a visit to Western Europe. Hugh worked hard and spent a lot to retrieve them, whereupon he had them imprisoned at Kyrenia Castle until the pope intervened.

== Succession ==
After the death of his eldest son, Guy, in 1343, the problem of succession to Hugh IV was looming. The customs of both Cyprus and Jerusalem favored Peter, Hugh's eldest surviving son, but Guy had left a son, Hugh, by Maria of Bourbon. Guy's son and his maternal relatives claimed that Guy and Maria's marriage contract contained a clause guaranteeing the rights of any son born to them to inherit the throne if Guy predeceased King Hugh. Pope Clement VI expressed his endorsement of the grandson's claim provided that the clause existed, but the text of the contract as published by the 19th-century French historian Louis de Mas Latrie does not contain it. Hugh's relationship with his daughter-in-law and grandson was poor. He refused to allow them to leave Cyprus until 1346, two years after Clement asked him to settle Maria's dower and let her go. The payment of Maria's dower remained contentious, and King Hugh apparently ignored Clement's requests to provide an income for her son.

On 24 November 1358, in an effort to pre-empt his grandson's claim, Hugh IV had Peter crowned king of Cyprus. The coronation of an heir apparent had no precedent in Cyprus, but was common in earlier centuries in France and occurred in Jerusalem too. Hugh IV died on 10 October 1359.

== Issue ==
With Maria of Ibelin:

- Guy (c. 1316 – soon before 24 September 1343 and buried in Nicosia), constable of Cyprus (1336–1338) and titular prince of Galilee c. 1320. He married by proxy at the Château de Bourbon on 29 November 1328 and in person at Santa Sophia, Nicosia on 15–30 January 1330 Marie of Bourbon (1315–1387 in Naples and buried there), princess of Achaia. Guy and Marie had:
  - Hugh (1335–1385/1386 in Cyprus), who succeeded his father as titular prince of Galilee in 1343, senator of Rome on 12 August 1360 and lord of Arnecha and Leondaki in January 1365. He married after Autumn 1365 Marie de Morphou (d. after 1383), daughter of Sir Jean de Morphou, Comte de Roucha, without issue.

With Alice:

- Eschiva (c. 1322 – 1363 of the plague and buried in Nicosia), married after 5 March 1337/1339, separated since 22 April 1341, Ferdinand of Majorca (March/April, 1317 – c. 1343/1347), Viscount of Aumelàs.
- Peter I (1328–1369), succeeded him as king of Cyprus and Jerusalem.
- John (c. 1329 or 1329/1330–1375), regent of Cyprus and titular prince of Antioch, murdered, married twice, firstly in 1343 to Constance, daughter of Frederick III of Sicily and Eleanor of Anjou, without issue, and secondly in 1350 to Alice of Ibelin (d. after 1373), by whom he had issue
- James I (1334–1398), succeeded his nephew Peter II of Cyprus.

Three other children of Hugh whose mothers are uncertain:

- Thomas (d. 15 November 1340), unmarried and without issue
- Perrot (d. 29 June 1353), unmarried and without issue
- Margaret, married in 1347/1349 Gautier de Dampierre (-sur-Salon) (d. after 1373), Seneschal of Cyprus.

== Sources ==
- Edbury, Peter W. (1991). The Kingdom of Cyprus and the Crusades, 1191–1374. Cambridge University Press.

Hugh IV of Cyprus House of Lusignan Born: c. 1295 Died: 10 October 1359
Regnal titles
Preceded by Henry II	King of Cyprus; 1324–1358	Succeeded by Peter I
Preceded by Henry II	— TITULAR — King of Jerusalem; 1324–1358	Succeeded by Peter I
