= Eleanor of Aragon, Queen of Cyprus =

Eleanor of Aragon

Queen consort of Cyprus
- Tenure: 1358 – 17 January 1369
- Coronation: 5 April 1360 (Famagusta) as Queen of Jerusalem
- Born: 1333
- Died: 26 December 1416 (aged 82–83); Barcelona, Principality of Catalonia, Crown of Aragon
- Burial: Barcelona
- Spouse: Peter I of Cyprus (m. 1353; died 1369)
- Issue: Peter II of Cyprus; Margaret, Countess of Tripoli
- House: Barcelona
- Father: Peter of Aragon, Count of Ribagorza, Empúries and Prades
- Mother: Joan of Foix

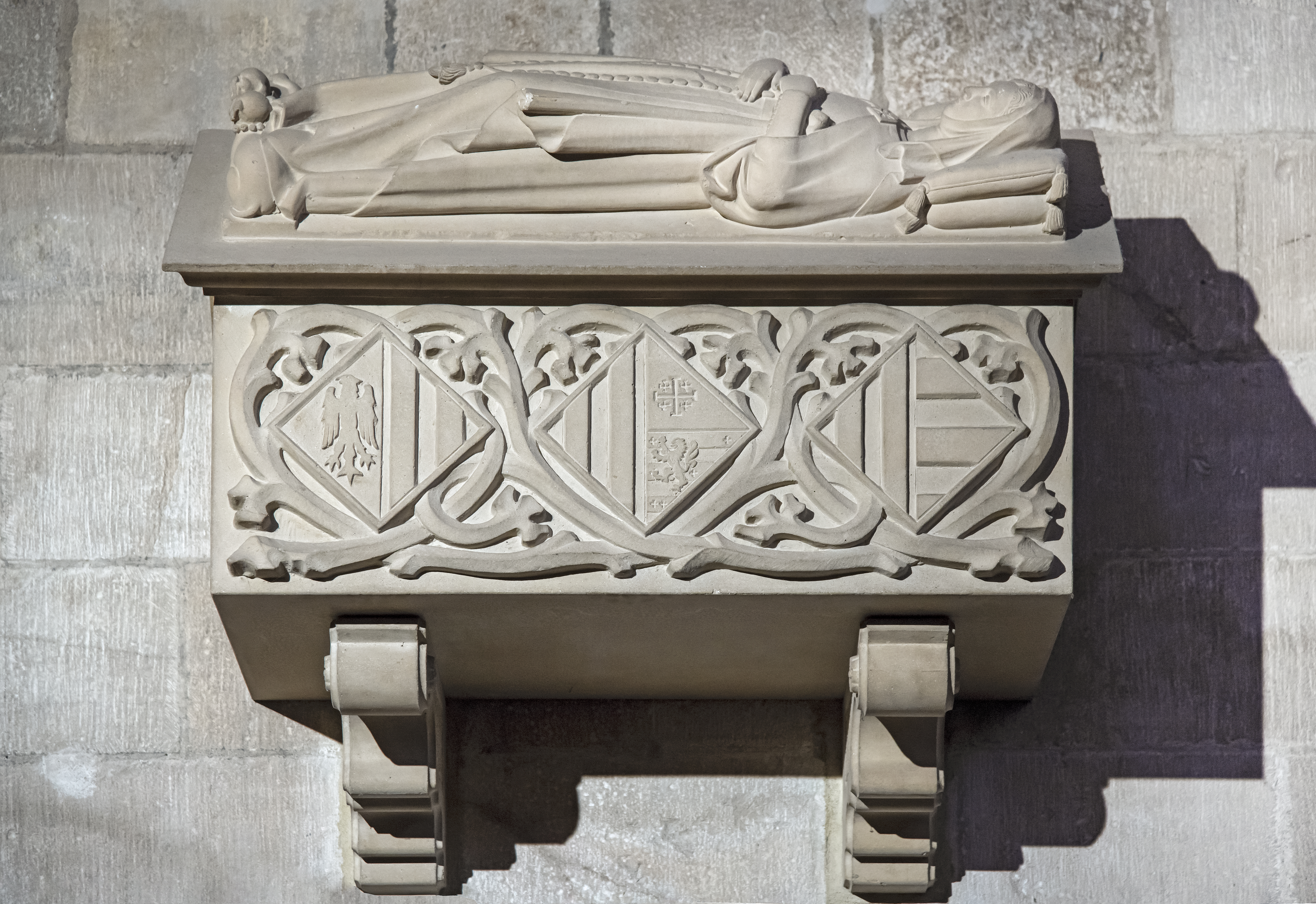
Her tomb in Barcelona

Eleanor of Aragon (1333 – 26 December 1416) was Queen consort of Cyprus by marriage to Peter I of Cyprus. She was regent of Cyprus during the absence of her spouse in 1366, and regent during the minority of her son Peter II of Cyprus from 1369.

== Life ==
Eleanor was a member of the House of Barcelona as the daughter of Peter of Aragon and Joan of Foix.

To enhance his kingdom's political and economic power in the Mediterranean, King Peter IV of Aragon arranged a marriage in 1353 between his cousin Eleanor and Peter I of Cyprus. By this marriage Eleanor became Queen of Cyprus and titular Queen of Jerusalem and Armenia.

=== Queen regent of Cyprus ===
The reign of Eleanor's husband did not immediately benefit Cyprus. Her husband kept mistresses, which she was unable to endure. In 1366, when Peter went off on a crusade against Alexandria, he made Eleanor regent of Cyprus.

After the return of Peter I from a long trip to Europe, Eleanor was accused of having committed adultery with John of Morf, the titular ruler of Edessa. The court convened, but subsequently dismissed the charges. Peter then bullied Eleanor's favored nobles, including his own brothers. On 17 January 1369, Peter was murdered in the arms of a lover, perhaps on the orders of his brothers John and James.

On behalf of her son, Eleanor was again regent, together with, John and James. She stood first in Cyprus to prevent her son's throne from being usurped.

In a secret message, she invited the Genoese to a de facto invasion of Cyprus, to take revenge on her brothers-in-law. With the help of the betrayal of John Morf, Cyprus was conquered by the Genoese in 1373 who also captured James. Eleanor led the assassination of John in 1374.

In 1378, Peter II married Valentina Visconti, daughter of Barnabò Visconti. The first choice of his marriage would have been to a daughter of John V Palaiologos; this suggestion was rejected for political reasons, since the Latins did not encourage the marriage of Peter to a Greek princess. The justification that was given to the Palaiologos messengers was that the king was busy with the dangers that threatened Cyprus because of the Genoese invasion of the island.

It is known that Eleanor did not get along with Valentina due to being involved in many issues and scandals. In 1381, the now 44-year-old Eleanor was forced to return to Catalonia, to prevent more problems with Valentina.

=== Lady of Valls ===
After her return, her cousin, Peter IV of Aragon, entrusted Eleanor with the city of Valls. She was co-ruler with the archbishop of Tarragona.

Eleanor moved into the archbishop's palace in Valls. This changed within a short time into a sovereign court with numerous officials and minions; some had accompanied her from Cyprus.

It was necessary in Valls that a tax had to be paid on the import of wine. The favourites of the Queen, however, insisted that they were exempt from these taxes. This led to a revolt, with casualties on both sides. There was no choice but for her friends to pay the taxes.

After the death of King Peter IV, power was transferred to his son and successor, King John I. The clashes between the population and the Queen Dowager of Cyprus, however, continued. For alleged insults against the citizens, they broke into the palace and killed John, brother and butler to Eleanor; he was murdered in front of Eleanor. Terrified, Eleanor fled to territory of her brother. After twelve years of living in Valls, Eleanor never returned.

She died on 26 December 1416 in the Castle of Falset, Catalonia.

== Issue ==
Peter and Eleanor had the following children:

- Peter II of Cyprus (c. 1357–1382), succeeded him as King of Cyprus and Jerusalem
- Marie named Mariette (c. 1360 – c. 1397), once engaged to Carlo Visconti and married in 1385 to her cousin James of Lusignan (d. 1395/1397), titular Count of Tripoli, son of John of Lusignan and second wife Alice of Ibelin, and had issue
- Eschive (d. before 1369), died young. It is possible that she was the daughter of Peter's first wife, Eschive de Montfort rather than Eleanor

Preceded by Alix of Ibelin	Queen consort of Cyprus; 1358 – 17 January 1369	Succeeded by Valentina Visconti
