= John of Lusignan =

Regent of Cyprus and Prince of Antioch (1329/30–1375)

John of Lusignan (French: Jean de Lusignan; 1329-1330, c. 1329 or 1329/1330 – 1375) was a regent of the Kingdom of Cyprus and later Constable of Cyprus and titular Prince of Antioch in 1345. He was son of King Hugh IV of Cyprus and his second wife Alice of Ibelin. He was a member of the House of Lusignan.

== Life ==
While being a regent of Cyprus, John launched an attack on Mamluk ports. He attacked Sidon on 5 June 1369, but after a day of skirmishes, his fleet was diverted by a storm. He later avoided fortified Beirut, but managed to pillage both Botron and Tartus. He went further north to Latakia, Ayas and Antalya, before attacking Alexandria on 9–10 July, where the Cypriots tried in vain to seize a large Moroccan merchant ship.They returned to Sidon on 19 July, where they managed to land and defeat the garrison, but were forced to evacuate due to a storm. They cast anchor at Famagusta on 22 July.

John was murdered in Nicosia on the instigation of Eleanor of Aragon, Queen of Cyprus, and the Genoese as a result of his involvement in the murder of his elder brother, King Peter I of Cyprus. Tradition says that he killed the two Bulgarians that constituted his personal guard, by throwing them one by one from the windows of that particular tower.

== Legacy ==
The historian Stefano Lusignan was his descendant.

The Prince John Tower of Saint Hilarion Castle was named after him.

== Marriage and issue ==
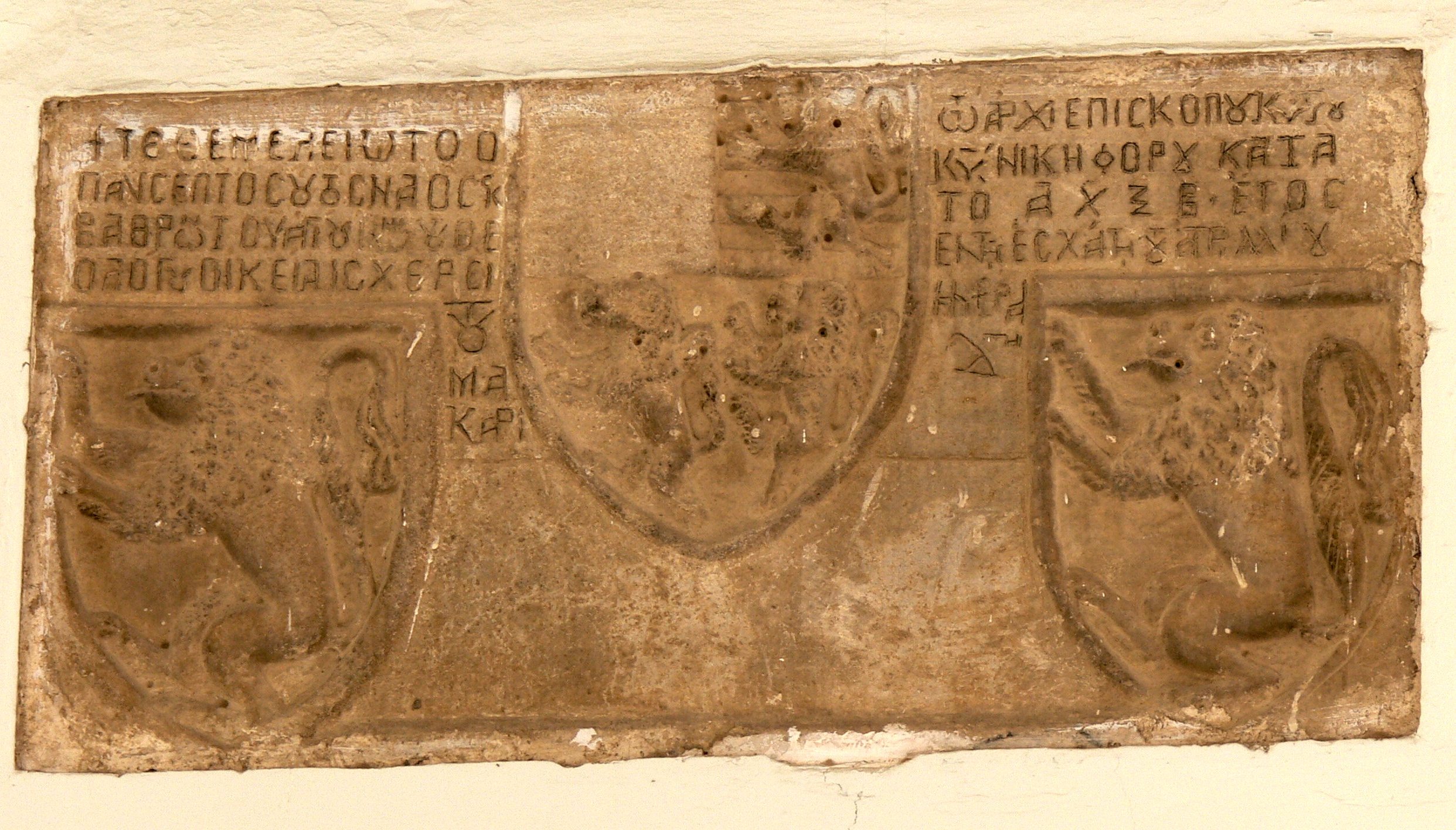
The Lusignan coat of arms on the foundation inscription of the Cathedral of Saint John in Nicosia, Cyprus

John married twice, firstly with dispensation on 16 April 1343 to Constance of Sicily, daughter of Frederick III of Sicily and Eleanor of Anjou, without issue, and secondly with dispensation on 13 April 1350 to Alice of Ibelin, daughter of Guy of Ibelin, seneschal of Cyprus, and wife Margaret of Ibelin, by whom he was the father of:

- James of Lusignan (died before 1395 or 1395/1397), titular Count of Tripoli in 1382, married c. 1385 or in 1385 to his cousin Mariette of Lusignan (c. 1360 – c. 1397)

He had one illegitimate son by Alice Embriaco de Giblet, who was married:

- John called Janot of Lusignan (died after 1410), titular Lord of Beirut, married in 1385 to Margaret of Morpho, daughter of John of Morpho, Marshal of Cyprus and titular Count of Edessa, and wife, the parents of:
  - John of Lusignan (died c. 1456), titular Lord of Beirut

== Sources ==
- Setton, Kenneth Meyer (1976). The Papacy and the Levant, 1204-1571: The thirteenth and fourteenth centuries. American Philosophical Society. ISBN 9780871691149.
- L. de Mas Latrie, "Généalogie des rois de Chypre"
- Edbury, Peter W. (1994). The Kingdom of Cyprus and the Crusades, 1191-1374. Cambridge University Press.
