= Peter II of Cyprus =

Peter II
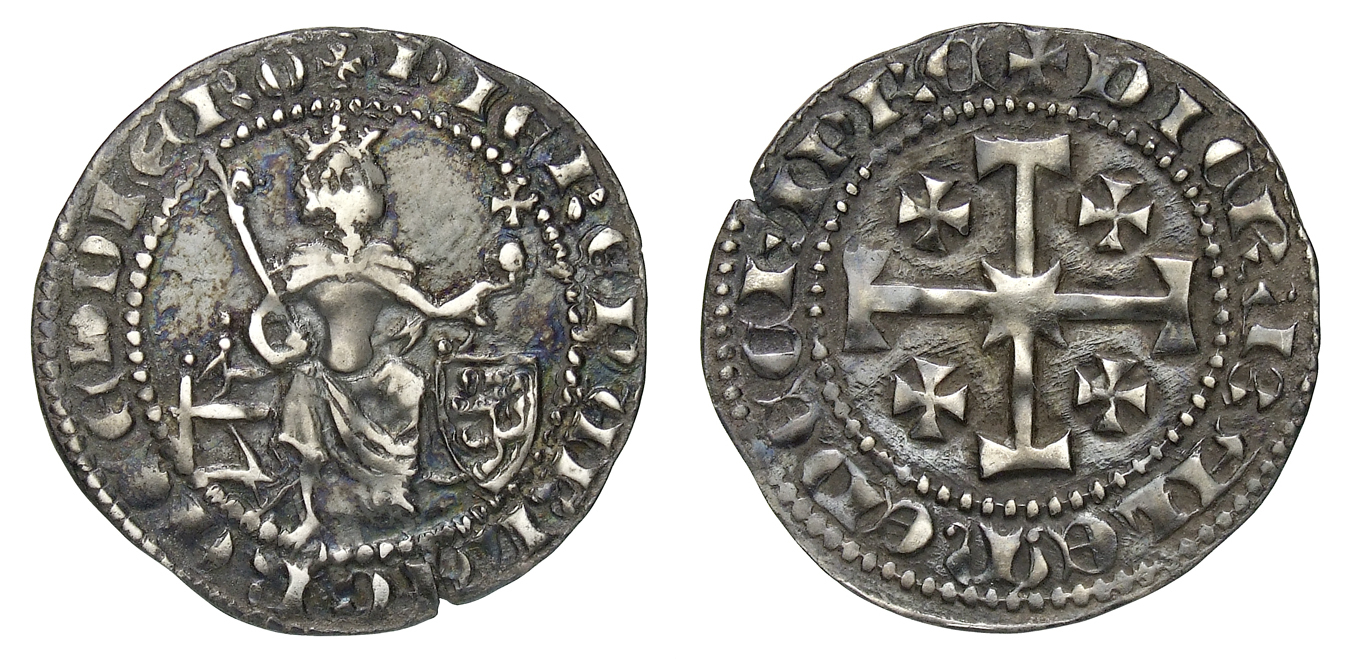
- Coin depicting Peter II of Cyprus

King of Cyprus
- Reign: 17 January 1369 – 13 October 1382
- Predecessor: Peter I
- Successor: James I
- Born: c. 1354 or 1357; Cyprus
- Died: 13 October 1382 (aged 25–28); Nicosia, Cyprus
- Spouse: Valentina Visconti (m. 1376)
- Issue: A daughter
- House: Poitiers-Lusignan
- Father: Peter I of Cyprus
- Mother: Eleanor of Aragon

Peter II (1354 or 1357 – 13 October 1382), called the Fat (French: Pierre le Gros), was the eleventh king of Cyprus of the House of Lusignan from 17 January 1369 until his death. He was the son of Peter I of Cyprus and Eleanor of Aragon. He succeeded to the throne while he was still under age, following the assassination of his father in 1369. He was also titular Count of Tripoli and King of Jerusalem.

== Biography ==
=== Family ===
He was married by proxy in Milan on 2 April 1376, and in person at Santa Sophia, Nicosia, either in July or August 1378. His wife was Valenza or Valentina Visconti, a daughter of Bernabò Visconti, co-lord of Milan, and his wife, Beatrice della Scala. Peter II had one daughter by Valentina in 1379 or 1380, but the child died as an infant in Nicosia sometime not long before 3 October 1382, and was buried at St. Dominic's, Nicosia.

Before Peter's marriage had been arranged, it had been suggested that he marry Irene, a daughter of the Byzantine Emperor, John V Palaiologos. The suggestion was rejected for political and perhaps religious reasons; Roman Catholics did not approve of the idea of Peter marrying a Greek princess. The explanation given to the Palaiologos messengers was that the Peter was too busy with the dangers that threatened Cyprus because of the Genoese invasion of the island to consider remarriage at the time.

Peter, who had no surviving children, was succeeded by his uncle, who became James I of Cyprus.

=== Reign ===
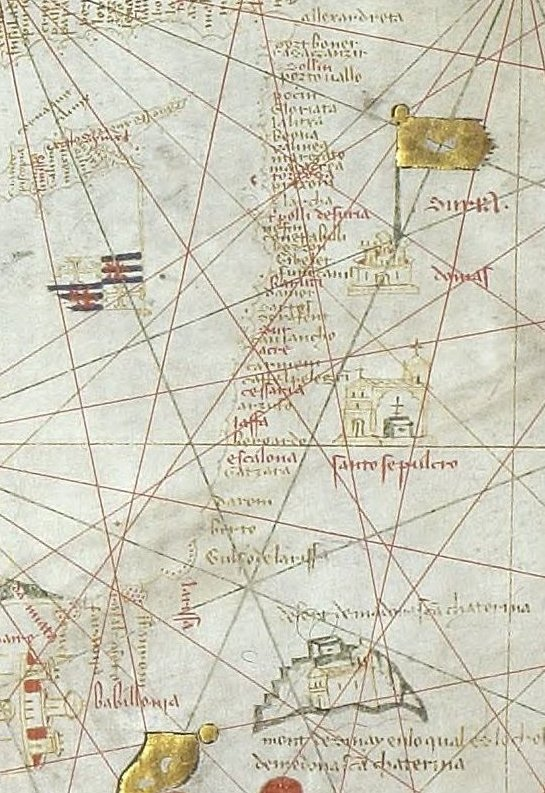
Portolan chart of c. 1380, showing Cyprus near the top with the Lusignan banner.

His reign was characterised by a decline of the kingdom of Cyprus, in contrast to his father's relatively successful reign. He lost his father's Cypriot possessions in Asia Minor. Cyprus was also invaded, disastrously, by the Genoese in 1373–1374. This led to the capture of Famagusta, the most important harbour town, which thereafter began to decline. There were also major changes in the condition of other major towns of Cyprus as a result of the war with the Genoese.

Peter II was declared King of Cyprus after his father's murder in January 1369; however, at fifteen, he was still a minor, so his uncle John of Lusignan, Prince of Antioch ruled the Kingdom as regent until Peter came of age. John's appointment as regent provoked strong opposition, especially from Peter's mother Eleanor of Aragon, who believed that he had been involved in her husband's murder. Vowing revenge, Eleanor secretly sent messages to European powers asking for military aid to punish those whom she believed to be Peter I's murderers. The Genoese responded positively, seeing it as a chance to gain power in the politics of Cyprus and possibly even seize control of the kingdom. Eleanor invited them to invade the island in exchange for her vengeance.

On 6 January, 1372, Peter II was crowned in Nicosia at the Cathedral of St. Sophia as King of Cyprus, and on 10 October at the Cathedral of St. Nicholas in Famagusta as King of Jerusalem. It was here that the Genoese found their opportunity for intervention in Cyprus. During the crowning ceremony at Famagusta, according to custom, the leaders of the Genoese and Venetian communities at Famagusta had the honour of holding the two reins of the royal horse. There was a conflict over who would hold the right rein and who would hold the left which grew and continued into the celebration dinner and afterward, and expanded into the streets of Famagusta, where the Venetians and the Genoese fought each other, resulting in a great deal of damage and many victims. Genoese traders were considered responsible for the fighting and were arrested. The other Genoese organised an expedition, financed by the wealthy people of Genoa, headed by Peter di Campofregoso, brother of the Doge.

King Peter and his councillors in Cyprus believed that all available military forces should be brought together to face the Genoese threat. Peter therefore made a treaty with Emir Teke forfeiting Antalya (which had been captured by his father, Peter I) to him. The Cypriots withdrew their forces in 1373. Peter did not lead the resistance against the Genoese, but left it to his uncles, John and James. The young king, who was with his mother Eleanor on Famagusta, lost the city and was captured. Famagusta, which was excellently fortified, was captured by the Genoese when the city allowed them to enter, supposedly for negotiations.

Peter and Eleanor were held captive by the Genoese, who also attacked Limassol and Paphos, and entered the kingdom's capital, Nicosia. Peter's uncles John and James resisted successfully against the Genoese from Saint Hilarion Castle and the town of Kyrenia. The following year, Peter was forced to come to a humiliating agreement with the Genoese declaring that Kyrenia and what remained of Famagusta would fall under Genoese sovereignty, that he would pay huge compensations to the Genoese, and that James would leave Cyprus. James obeyed and departed from Kyrenia for Europe, but on the way he was arrested by the Genoese, despite the fact that they had told him they would give him time to leave.

It was at this time, in 1374, that Cyprus ceased to hold the residence of the exiled Latin Patriarch of Jerusalem. The Patriarch had fled to Cyprus following the Fall of Acre in 1291 and his heirs remained there for the next eighty years, but after the events of 1374 the Catholic Church shifted to appointing titular Patriarchs of Jerusalem who were based at the Basilica di San Lorenzo fuori le Mura in Rome.

The operation in Cyprus brought the Genoese many benefits. Before they left, they executed those who were allegedly involved in Peter I's murder, as they had promised Eleanor, who, in 1375, had Prince John killed.

The powerful Eleanor had already come into conflict with Valentina Visconti not long after she married Peter I. Eleanor was involved in numerous court scandals and other issues, so Peter decided to send her away. Despite her protests, Eleanor returned to Castile in September 1378.

Peter successfully negotiated a peace treaty with the Sultan of Egypt. He also built and improved the fortifications of Nicosia, as well as building a royal villa in the village of Potamia and other building projects. Like his father, he created his own similar currencies. He died on 13 October 1382 at the Palace of La Cava, Nicosia, and was buried at St. Dominic's, Nicosia.

Regnal titles
Preceded by Peter I	King of Cyprus; 1369–1382	Succeeded by James I
Preceded by Peter I	— TITULAR — King of Jerusalem; 1369–1382	Succeeded by James I
