= Peter I of Cyprus =

King of Cyprus from 1358 to 1369

Peter I
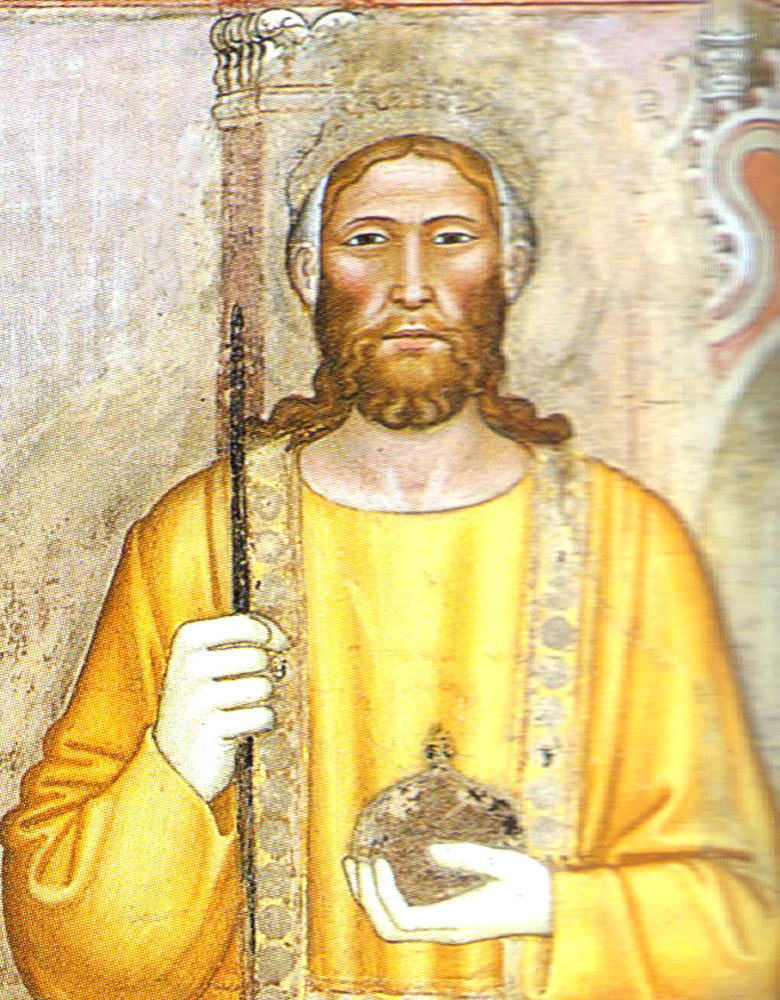
- Fresco portrait by Andrea di Bonaiuto, c. 1366

King of Cyprus
- Reign: 1358–1369
- Predecessor: Hugh IV
- Successor: Peter II
- Born: 9 October 1328; Nicosia, Cyprus
- Died: 17 January 1369 (aged 40); Nicosia, Cyprus
- Spouse: Eschive de Montfort (m. 1342; died 1350) Eleanor of Aragon (m. 1353)
- Issue: Peter II of Cyprus; Mariette of Lusignan
- House: Poitiers-Lusignan
- Father: Hugh IV
- Mother: Alice of Ibelin
- Religion: Catholicism
- Military career
- Conflicts: Alexandrian Crusade; Battle of Tripoli (1367)

Peter I (9 October 1328 – 17 January 1369) was King of Cyprus and titular King of Jerusalem from his father's abdication on 24 November 1358 until his death in 1369. He was invested as titular Count of Tripoli in 1346. As King of Cyprus, he had some military successes, but was unable to complete many of his plans due to internal disputes that culminated in his assassination at the hands of three of his knights.

== Early life and crowning ==
Peter was born in Nicosia in 1328, the second son of Hugh IV of Cyprus, the first by his second wife Alice of Ibelin. Hugh's heir apparent was his first born son, Guy, who had married Marie of Bourbon. Guy died before his father, however; and though his son, also named Hugh, demanded the throne, Peter was crowned King of Cyprus by Guy of Ibelin, bishop of Limassol in the Cathedral of Santa Sophia, Nicosia on 24 November 1359.

In 1349 he secretly traveled to Europe with his brother John. This upset their father who sent ships to find his sons and bring them back. When they were brought back, Peter and John were imprisoned for leaving without his permission. Despite Leontios Machairas stating Peter and John were held for three days, William of Machaut in the Prise d'Alexandrie states that Peter was imprisoned for two months and nine days.

Peter was crowned titular King of Jerusalem in Saint Nicholas Cathedral in Famagusta on 5 April 1360, succeeding his father. Upon the fall of Acre in 1291, Cyprus became the last stronghold of Christianity in the Middle East. Peter understood the importance of his kingdom, and believed that his mission was to fight Islam. He had ambitions to retake the Kingdom of Jerusalem to which the house of Lusignan pretended.

coat-of-arms of Lusignan of Cyprus and Jerusalem

== Wars against the Turks ==
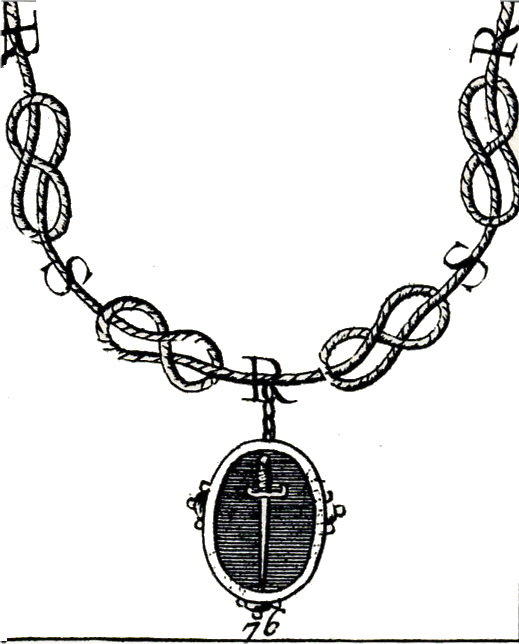
Order of the Sword (1347)

Neighboring Muslim powers were potentially a great threat to Cyprus, the last Crusader stronghold on the mainland of the Near East having been wiped out with the Fall of Acre in 1291. Around then the Ottomans had recently come to the fore, but had their eye fixed on what remained of the Byzantine Empire. In addition, they were primarily a land power, and for the moment the remaining Latin Christian entities in the region could hold their own on the seas. Along with the Knights Hospitaller the kings of Cyprus were the main inheritors of the Crusading tradition. Peter founded the chivalric Order of the Sword in 1347, which was dedicated to the recovery of Jerusalem.

The royal family were the titular kings of the Kingdom of Jerusalem, who had fled to Cyprus. Reduced as they were, this Crusader heritage continued in the form of sea-borne raids, and were remarkably successful given their limited resources.

Unlike his father, Peter embraced this tradition and began with in a raid on Korikos, a fortified harbour in the Armenian Kingdom of Cilicia. His primary focus of activity was along the coast of Asia Minor, since the Christian Armenians in Cilicia had strong relations with the Kingdom of Cyprus via marriage ties. In January 1360, the residents of Korikos sent their representatives to Cyprus to ask for protection, since their city was threatened by the Turks. Peter sent some of his men led by the knight Roberto de Luisignan. The Turks were unable to break the Cypriot siege of Korikos.

The siege of Korikos was seen as a threat by Muslim leaders of Asia Minor and they allied against Peter. They attacked Cyprus with many ships but Peter obtained aid from the Knights Hospitaller from Rhodes. Other help came from the Pope and from pirates. In July 1361, Peter mustered a fleet of 120 ships. With his force, Peter attacked Asia Minor, continuing his policy of preemptive attacks. On 23 August 1361, Cypriot forces landed in Antalya and Peter conquered the city after a siege on 24 August 1361. After this victory, the remaining emirs of the region offered Peter an annual tribute. Peter accepted the offer and sent his flags, coats of arms and symbols to be raised in many cities of Asia Minor. He stayed in Antalya until 8 September 1361. He went to other cities, some of whose emirs knelt to him, gave him presents, keys to castles and other gifts. He returned with his trophies to Cyprus on 22 September 1361.

The emir of Antalya, after he lost his city, took a large army and after many attacks tried to occupy his city. After hard fighting, Cypriots managed to keep the city and also to siege the guard in the region of Myrres.

== Tour of Europe ==
Peter faced a serious problem of his recognition as holder of the throne of Cyprus, as his nephew Hugh went to the Pope to ask for the throne with the support of the King of France. Since Peter had sent nobles as his representatives to the Pope to support him without result, he resolved to visit the Pope himself. At the end of October 1362, he left from Paphos via Rhodes to Venice and he was accepted there with honour. He went to Avignon and visited the Pope together with the claimant of the throne of Cyprus. Peter was recognised as King and Hugh agreed to a high annual benefit, solving the problem.

Taking advantage of his trip in Europe, he tried to convince powerful rulers to strengthen him by organizing a crusade to liberate the Holy Land and the Kingdom of Jerusalem which belonged to him. This was discussed with the newly elected pope, after the death of the previous incumbent. For the same reason he travelled to England, Germany, and France. During his visit in England the historical Banquet of the Five Kings took place.

He visited some powerful cities including Genoa, Venice, Prague, and Kraków, where he participated in a gathering of monarchs where guests of the Polish king were Charles IV, Holy Roman Emperor, King Louis I of Hungary, King Valdemar IV of Denmark, Siemowit III of Masovia, Bolko II of Świdnica, Władysław Opolczyk, Rudolf IV, Duke of Austria, Bogislaw V, Duke of Pomerania, Casimir IV, Duke of Pomerania, Otto V, Duke of Bavaria, and Louis VI the Roman. During the festivities in Kraków King Peter won the royal Tournament. He travelled on, meeting several monarchs in London, at the meeting of kings of England, Scotland, France and Denmark. He did not manage to persuade those monarchs to compete in a new Pan-European and Pan-Christian crusade in the Middle East. In 1363, Peter, who was in Italy, received an appeal from the barons of the Armenian Kingdom of Cilicia, nominating him as king.

Meanwhile, Cyprus was governed by Prince John, brother of Peter who remained as vice-King, and faced many problems, such as the epidemics of 1363, which killed many Cypriots (one of them was Eschiva, Peter's sister). The Turks who heard that the Cypriot people were dying, began new raids and pillages on the island. At the same time an episode between Cypriots and Genoese navies in Famagusta became a political issue and resulted in fights and killings. Peter who happened to be in Genoa, negotiated and signed a treaty with the Genoese declaring what rights the Genoese colonists of Cyprus could have.

== Alexandria Crusade ==
On 11 October 1365 Peter led a mixed Cypriot and Western force of Crusaders on 70 ships to sack Alexandria. However, the mercenary troops refused to remain in Alexandria, and he was obliged to return to Cyprus, the only permanent result of his expedition being the enmity of the Sultan of Egypt. Reprisals followed against Christian merchants in Syria and Egypt, and Pope Urban V advised Peter to make peace with the Sultan after unsuccessfully attempting to raise support among the European monarchs.

== Attacks on Lebanon and Syria ==
Peter continued his crusade, this time aiming to attack Beirut. However his military operations ended after the Venetians offered Peter high compensation for his military preparations, to not attack Damascus. He raided Tripoli in January 1366, before the terms of service of his European reinforcements expired. He attempted again to raise a force in Europe in 1368, but was unsuccessful. Urban V again counseled peace, and Peter was compelled to join the Pope and the Venetians in making a peace treaty with Egypt.

The commerce with Middle East benefited Cyprus and because of Peter, Famagusta was one of the richest cities in the Mediterranean during his time. Some financier friends of Peter were rich tradesmen from Famagusta, who could influence him. The Sultan could no longer tolerate the insult of the capture of Alexandria and could not accept a friendly arrangement with Peter. The attack against Tripoli was a clear message to the Sultan; either he agreed a peace and could begin to trade, or he would suffer continued attacks. The Sultan wanted to create a movement of distraction, so he strengthened the emirs of Asia Minor and assembled an army to attack Korikos. Peter reinforced the garrison in Korikos with new troops and they repulsed the Turkish attack. In May 1367, the garrison in Antalya revolted because of the delayed payment of their wages. Peter sailed there and imposed order, decapitating the ring leaders of the revolt.

After, it was agreed to make peace with the Sultan of Egypt, although it proved impossible to sign. In late September 1367, there were other attacks on the Syrian coast, including Tripoli, Tartus, and Baniyas. However, the invading forces could not land at Latakia, due to a storm. They moved north to attack Ayas, but opted not to storm the nearby castle. Before returning to Famagusta, they raided Sidon and captured three merchantman ships and another vessel on the way back. As Leontios Machairas writes, the reason that Peter could not keep Tripoli was because the city did not have walls.

== Death ==
Peter returned to Cyprus, but was rapidly plunged into domestic troubles. Queen Eleanor had been unfaithful during his long absences in Europe, and he retaliated by tyrannizing her favorite nobles, alienating his brothers. He subsequently grew more erratic in his behavior, as exemplified by his decision to imprison the steward of his household, John Gorap, for failing to provide oil for the asparagus at dinner. On 17 January 1369 he was assassinated in his bed at the Palace of La Cava, Nicosia, by a faction of disgruntled noblemen, led by Philip of Ibelin, Henry of Jubail and John of Gaurelle. Several among this party (including Jubail and Gorap) had been liberated from prison that same evening, and it was rumored that they were only able to gain access to the palace with the aid of the King's brothers. Following the murder, one of the conspirators, James of Nores, was said to have castrated Peter's corpse while proclaiming 'It was this which cost you your life.'

Despite the harshness that brought an end to his life, his knight-errantry and crusading zeal led him to be regarded as the epitome of chivalry. He was buried in the church of St. Dominic's of Nicosia, the traditional burial place of the kings of Cyprus. He was succeeded by his son Peter II.

== Marriages ==
Soon after 28 June 1342 he married Eschiva de Montfort (d. before 1350), only daughter and heiress of Humphrey de Montfort (1305 – 24 June 1326), Constable of Cyprus and titular Lord of Toron, and Eschive d'Ibelin. Eschiva died before 1350 while Peter was still a teenager and the marriage was childless.

In 1353 he married Eleanor of Aragon-Gandia (1333 – 26 December 1416), daughter of Pedro, Infante of Aragon, Conde de Ribagorza, Ampurias y Prades, Seneschal of Catalonia, and Jeanne de Foix (d. before November 1358). Eleanor was crowned Queen of Cyprus on 24 November 1358 and Queen of Jerusalem on 5 April 1360.

His passion for his second wife was much remarked upon by chroniclers; the chronicle of Machairas tells how Peter always slept with Eleanora's night-dress in his arms:

"[S]o for the love which [King Peter] had promised that, wherever he was, he would take [Queen Eleanora's] shift to lay it at night in his arms when he slept, and he made his chamberlain always bring with him the Queen's shift, and had him put it in his bed."

== Children ==
Peter and Eleanor had:

- Peter II of Lusignan (c. 1357–1382), succeeded him as King of Cyprus and Jerusalem
- Mariette of Lusignan (c. 1360 – c. 1397), once engaged to Carlo Visconti and married in 1385 to her cousin James of Lusignan (d. 1395/1397), titular Count of Tripoli, son of John of Lusignan and wife Alix d'Ibelin, and had issue
- Eschiva of Lusignan (d. before 1369), died young

As Peter II of Cyprus remained heirless, the crown of Cyprus was passed to his uncle James I of Cyprus, son of Hugh IV of Cyprus and Alice of Ibelin.

== Sources ==
- Bolger, Diane R.; Serwint, Nancy J. (2002). "Sainted Ladies and Wicked Harlots: Perceptions of Gender in Medieval Cyprus". Engendering Aphrodite: Women and Society in Ancient Cyprus. American Schools of Oriental Research.
- Boulton, D'Arcy Jonathan Dacre (1987). The Knights of the Crown: The Monarchical Orders of Knighthood in Later Medieval Europe, 1325–1520. The Boydell Press. ISBN 9780851157955.
- Edbury, Peter W. (1991). The Kingdom of Cyprus and the Crusades, 1191–1374. Cambridge University Press.
- Ghazarian, Jacob G. (2000). The Armenian Kingdom in Cilicia During the Crusades. Routledge.166
- Hill, George (2010). A History of Cyprus. Vol. 2. Cambridge University Press.
- Hill, George (2010a). A History of Cyprus. Vol. 3. Cambridge University Press.
- Lock, Peter (2013). The Routledge Companion to the Crusades. Taylor & Francis.
- Setton, Kenneth Meyer (1976). The Papacy and the Levant, 1204–1571: The thirteenth and fourteenth centuries. American Philosophical Society. ISBN 9780871691149.
- Richard, Jean (1950). "Un Évêque d'Orient latin en XIVe siècle: Guy d'Ibelin, O.P., évêque de Limassol, et l'inventaire de ses biens". Bulletin de correspondance hellénique. LXXIV (1). doi:10.3406/bch.1950.2496.
- Teule, Herman G.B. (2012). "Christian-Muslim religious interaction 1200–1350. A historical and contextual introduction". In Thomas, David; Mallett, Alexander (eds.). Christian-Muslim Relations: A Bibliographical History. Vol. 4: (1200–1350). Brill.

Regnal titles
Preceded by Hugh IV	King of Cyprus; 1358–1369	Succeeded by Peter II
Preceded by Hugh IV	— TITULAR — King of Jerusalem; 1358–1369	Succeeded by Peter II
