= Great Madrasah (disambiguation) =

Great Madrasah may refer to:

- Great Madrasah (1573-1940) in Nicosia, Cyprus
- Great Madrasah (1924-1941) in Skopje, North Macedonia
- Great Madrasah (1771) in Yatağan, Turkey
