= Bishop of Cyprus =

Bishop of Cyprus may refer to

- The Anglican bishop of the Diocese of Cyprus and the Gulf
- The Orthodox Archbishop of Cyprus, see List of archbishops of Cyprus

== See also ==
- Latin Catholic Archdiocese of Nicosia
