= Kadı Menteş Mansion =

Mansion in the Selimiye quarter of North Nicosia

- Kadı Menteş Konağı
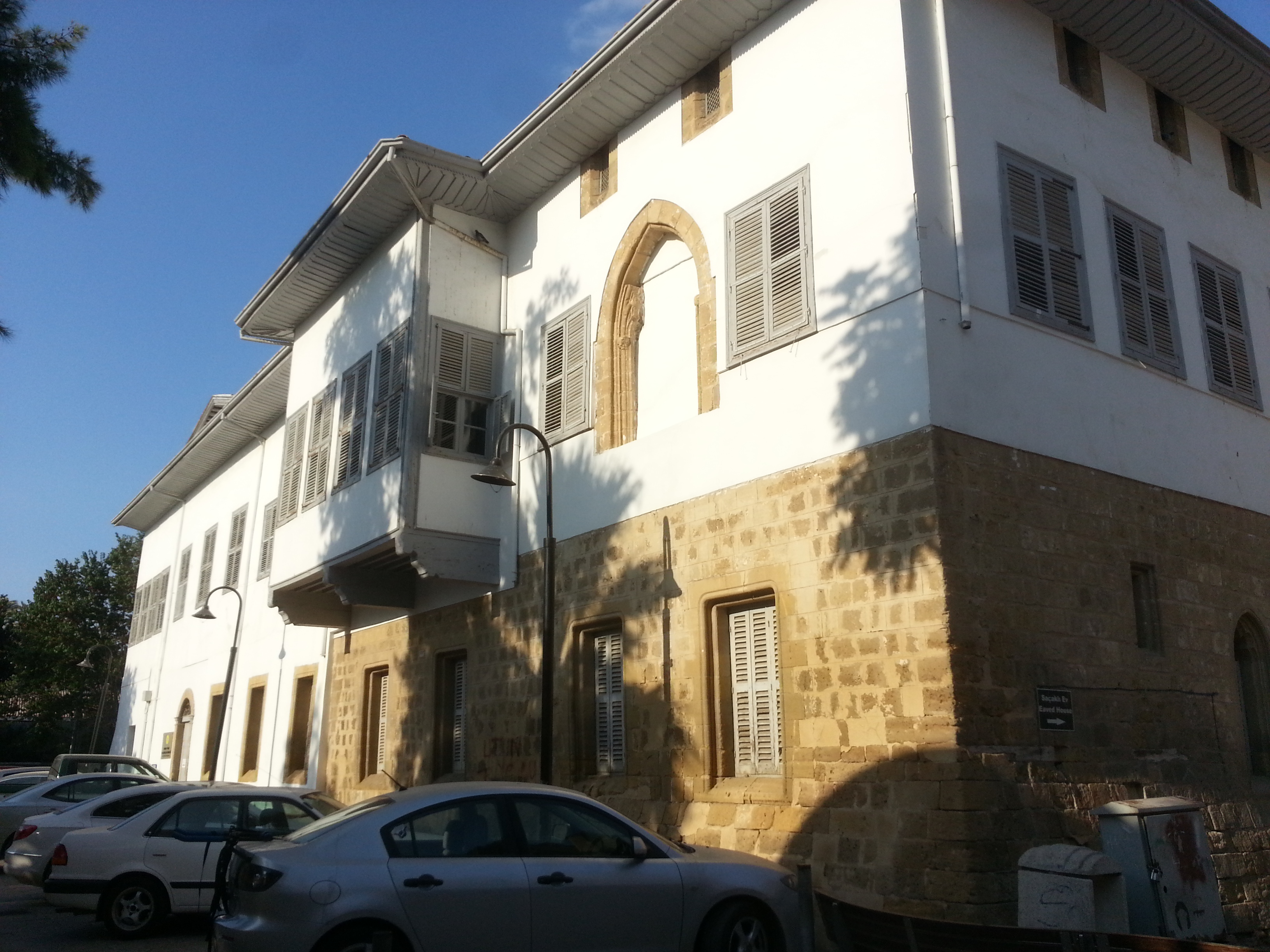
- The front façade of the mansion
- Interactive map of the Kadı Menteş Mansion area

General information
- Location: Selimiye, North Nicosia, Northern Cyprus
- Current tenants: Turkish Cypriot Union of Municipalities
- Construction started: 1329
- Renovated: 1975

Technical details
- Floor count: 2

Kadı Menteş Mansion (Turkish: Kadı Menteş Konağı) is a mansion in the Selimiye quarter of North Nicosia. It is located at the intersection of the Selimiye Square and the İdadi Street, and is currently as the headquarters of the Turkish Cypriot Union of Municipalities.

== History ==
The earliest parts of the building were built in 1329, during the Lusignan rule of the island, as the Latin Archbishopric Palace of Cyprus. This building initially had a rectangular plan, as opposed to the L-shaped structure of the contemporary mansion. The 30th Latin Archbishop of Cyprus, Orsini Aldobrandini of Rome, rebuilt the building between 1502 and 1524 and the building was kept for the same purpose during the Venetian rule in the island.

After the capture of Cyprus by the Ottoman Empire, the building was designated as the place of residence of the qadi of Cyprus. For this purpose, the upper floor of the building was built in the Ottoman architectural style. The building was used for this purpose for centuries, but was restored between 1819 and 1821 and became the place of residence of the governor. It became known as the "Küçük Mehmet Building" due to the fact that this change occurred during the administration of the governor Küçük Mehmed Pasha.

During the Ottoman period, the large and spacious yard of the building was confiscated and used as the site of several educational institutions: the Great Madrasah (destroyed in 1932), Small Madrasah (only its fountain survives), Library of Mahmud II. In 1897, an "idadi" (middle school) was built, which was later enlarged to also contain a "sultani" (high school), but converted into the Ayasofya Primary School after the Turkish educational reform in 1924 abolished religious education. Today, this building is used by the Folk Arts Foundation. In 1901, another "idadi" was built in the territory, later used as the Bayraktar Middle School until 1960 and today used by the Department of Antiquities.

It was later used as a building of the Nicosia Municipality and provided housing for civil servants. In 1979, the inhabitants were evicted and the mansion renovated, and granted to the Turkish Cypriot Union of Municipalities in November 1985.

== Architecture ==
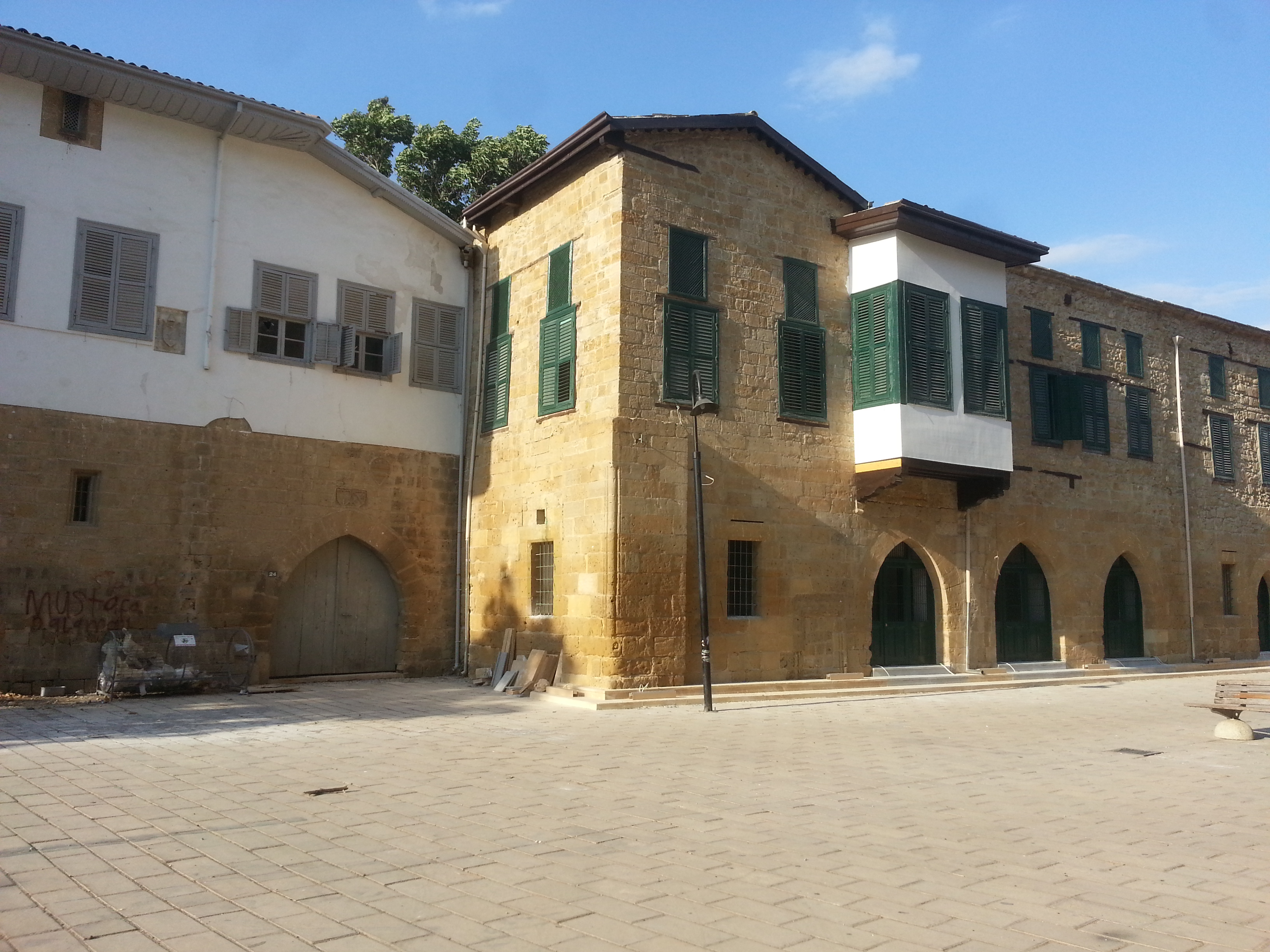
The façade towards the Selimiye Mosque. Coats of arms can be seen on the southern entrance gate.

The building has a Gothic southern entrance gate with three coats of arms inscribed on it. There are different claims regarding the ownership of these coats of arms, these include Costanza De Brie, who owned the land where St. Sophia's Cathedral was located, Prioli, the archbishop of Cyprus in 1495 and the Venetian family of Donado della Rose. The other coats of arms on the gate were removed and used at the construction of other buildings.

During the Venetian rule, the building had tunnels connecting it to St. Sophia's Cathedral and St. Catherine's Cathedral. There are indications of the existence of a tower for safety purposes on the southwestern corner of the building during this period. During the restoration, a closer examination of the building revealed that a greater portion of the building was dated to the Lusignan and Venetian eras.

The upper floor of the building exhibits typical Ottoman architecture, with thin walls, large rooms, a Baghdadi bay window and ornate walls. The motifs of flowers and plants are in the traditional çitakâri style, and are estimated to be dated from the 18th century.
