= Peter of Sargines =

Archbishop of Tyre (1235–1244)

Peter of Sargines, also called Peter II, was a Latin churchman who was the archbishop of Tyre in the Kingdom of Jerusalem from 1235 until 1244.

Peter was the uncle of Geoffrey of Sargines, seneschal of Jerusalem. He might have also been related to Margaret of Sargines, abbess of Montivilliers. Early in his career, he was abbot of Saint-Jacques de Provins. He had been appointed to the see of Tyre by December 1235.

Peter was the most senior church representative at the war council held in Acre in September 1239 after the arrival of King Theobald I of Navarre and about a thousand knights ahead of the Barons' Crusade. Robert of Nantes became Latin patriarch of Jerusalem in 1240, but he stayed in Europe until 1244 and empowered Peter to act as his vicar. The barons of the Kingdom of Jerusalem and the representatives of the Commune of Acre and the merchant colonies of Venice and Genoa met in the vicar's presence at the patriarch's palace in Acre on 5 June 1243 to discuss the claim of Alice of Champagne to the regency of the kingdom. According to the 13th-century chronicler John of Jaffa, the vicar at that time was the archbishop of Nicosia, Eustorge of Montaigu, while the lieutenant of the Venetian commune in Acre, Marsiglio Georgio, writes that the archbishop of Tyre was the vicar.

In 1244, Peter and many of his fellow bishops joined a vast Christian army in an alliance with the emir of Damascus, Al-Salih Ismail, after the Khwarazmians sacked Jerusalem. The confederate army was routed by the sultan of Egypt, As-Salih Ayyub, and his Khwarazmian allies at the Battle of Forbie near Gaza City on 18 October. Peter and Ralph, the bishop of Lydda, went missing and were presumed dead.
