= Giovanni Conti (died 1332) =

Italian nobleman and Dominican friar

Giovanni dei Conti di Poli (died 1 August 1332), sometimes shortened to Giovanni Conti or anglicized John of Conti, was an Italian nobleman and Dominican friar who served successively as the archbishop of Pisa (1299–1312) and archbishop of Nicosia (1312–1332).

== Family and early life ==
Born in the latter half of the 13th century, Giovanni was the third son of Pietro di Giovanni di Poli and Giacoma, daughter of Ottone Colonna. His parents belonged to two powerful families, his father to the Conti and his mother to the Colonna. He was a cousin of Cardinal Pietro Colonna. His eldest brother, Stefano, was the lord of Lunghezza and the senator of Rome under Popes Clement V and John XXII. He entered the Dominican Order and passed his novitiate in Viterbo. He studied at the University of Paris and was a lecturer at Orvieto and Siena. He was elected provincial of Rome in 1290, serving until 1297. During his tenure, the province of Naples was split off from Rome in 1296.

== Archbishop of Pisa ==
In 1299, Pope Boniface VIII appointed Giovanni archbishop of Pisa. He was consecrated in Rome by Cardinal Matteo d'Acquasparta and given the pallium by Cardinal Matteo Orsini. On 5 December 1299, Boniface granted him the authority to exempt the Republic of Pisa, up to a limit, from the rules on taxation of clergy laid out in the bull Clericis laicos. On 11 April 1300, Giovanni consecrated Ottone, the prior of the Dominicans of Pisa, as bishop of Terralba. Later that year, he asked the Pope to return the provostry of San Pietro, which the Pope had provided for his nephew, Benedetto Caetani. Instead, on 29 January 1301, Boniface granted the Camaldolese abbey of San Zenone to the archbishopric.

Giovanni consolidated the archdiocese's holdings by exchanging property in other dioceses for lands closer to Pisa. In 1307, Pope Clement V ordered him to examine the Templars in the patriarchate of Aquileia. In 1312, he welcomed Holy Roman Emperor Henry VII to Pisa.

== Archbishop of Nicosia ==
On 10 May 1312, Giovanni was transferred to the archdiocese of Nicosia in the Kingdom of Cyprus, which was at the time the wealthiest diocese in the Eastern Mediterranean and suffered a long vacancy owing to a disputed election. He requested that its income be assigned to his uncle, Cardinal Giacomo Colonna until he could take up his see. On 8 February 1314, Clement V authorized Giacomo to draw up to 5,000 florins annually from the archdiocese. In December 1318, Giovanni was in Avignon dealing with family affairs. He did not set out for Cyprus until 1319, after prompting from Pope John XXII. He arrived in Famagusta on 31 August and entered Nicosia on 6 September.

Giovanni maintained good relations with King Henry II of Cyprus and, on 30 March 1324, he crowned his successor, Hugh IV. He used his good offices to secure peace between Cyprus and the Italian merchant republics. In 1318, Cyprus had signed a truce with the Republic of Genoa and the Pope charged Giovanni with shepherding the parties towards a permanent peace. This was finally achieved in 1329. In 1328, Giovanni drafted a similar treaty with the Republic of Venice.

Giovanni commissioned and supervised the Chartularium sanctae Sophiae, a cartulary of all the documents in the archives of the cathedral of the Holy Wisdom dated between 1195 and 1292. This work was completed in 1322. He continued to renovate the cathedral, reconsecrating it on 14 November 1326.

Giovanni had a reputation for rigor and charity. He imposed rigorous standards of conduct on his clergy. He forbade them to engage in commerce and forbade laypersons to visit monasteries. Giovanni Colonna, his chaplain and a friend of Petrarch, wrote about his many acts of charity towards the poor. When violent storms and flooding struck Cyprus in November 1330, for example, he opened the church's grain stores.

Giovanni died in Nicosia on 1 August 1332.

== Bibliography ==
- Bacci, Michele (2000). "Tra Pisa e Cipro: la committenza artistica di Giovanni Conti (†1332)". Annali della Scuola Normale Superiore di Pisa: Classe di Lettere e Filosofia. 5 (2): 343–386. JSTOR 24308346.
- Coureas, Nicholas (1997). The Latin Church in Cyprus, 1195–1312. Routledge.
- Dykmans, Mark (1983). "Conti, Giovanni". Dizionario Biografico degli Italiani (in Italian). Vol. 28: Conforto–Cordero. Rome: Istituto dell'Enciclopedia Italiana. ISBN 978-88-12-00032-6.
- Ronzani, Mauro (2022). "Bishops, Archbishops, and Religious Institutions from the Ninth to the Fifteenth Century". In Karen Rose Mathews; Silvia Orvietani Busch; Stefano Bruni (eds.). A Companion to Medieval Pisa. Brill. pp. 361–382.
