= Library of Sultan Mahmud II =

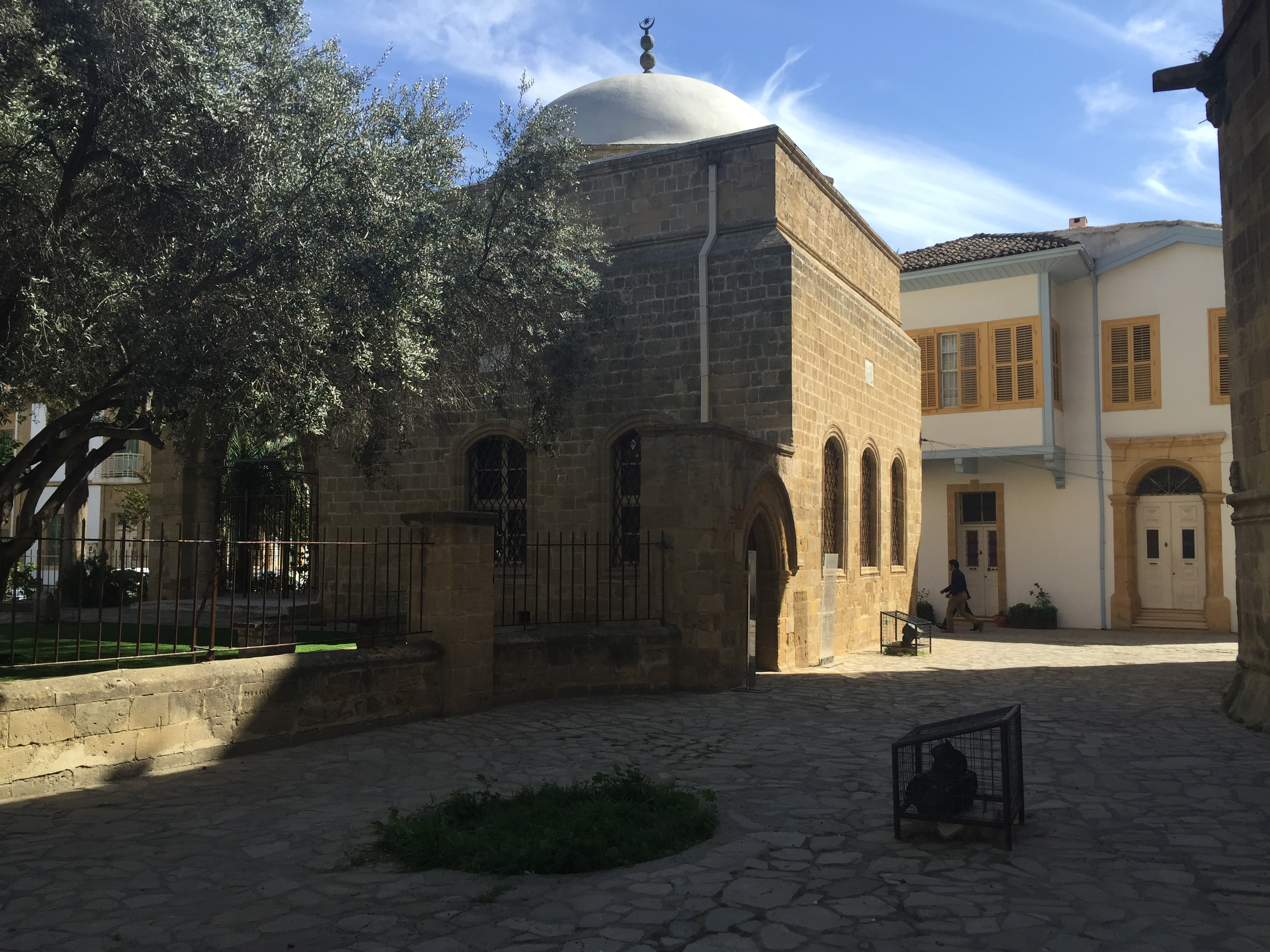
Library of Sultan Mahmud II, Nicosia.

Library of Sultan Mahmud II (Turkish: Sultan Mahmut Kütüphanesi) is a small domed building located to the immediate east of the Selimiye Mosque, Nicosia.

== History ==
The library was built in 1829 at the order of the Ali Ruhi Efendi, Governor of Cyprus. When the library was built, a Gothic portal of the thirteenth century was inserted in the eastern apse of the Selimiye to give direct access and the tympanum fitted with an Ottoman inscription. The garden to the library is entered through an arch, perhaps dating to the sixteenth century. The interior has book cases with the walls under the dome carrying a poem inscribed in gold letters by the well-known Cypriot poet Mufti Hilimi Hakkı Hodja. The poem was dedicated to Mahmud II and the Sultan was sufficiently pleased with the composition to bestow the title King of Poets on author in İstanbul. The library was constructed to serve the Büyük Medrese and did so until 1925. The Medrese was demolished 1931.

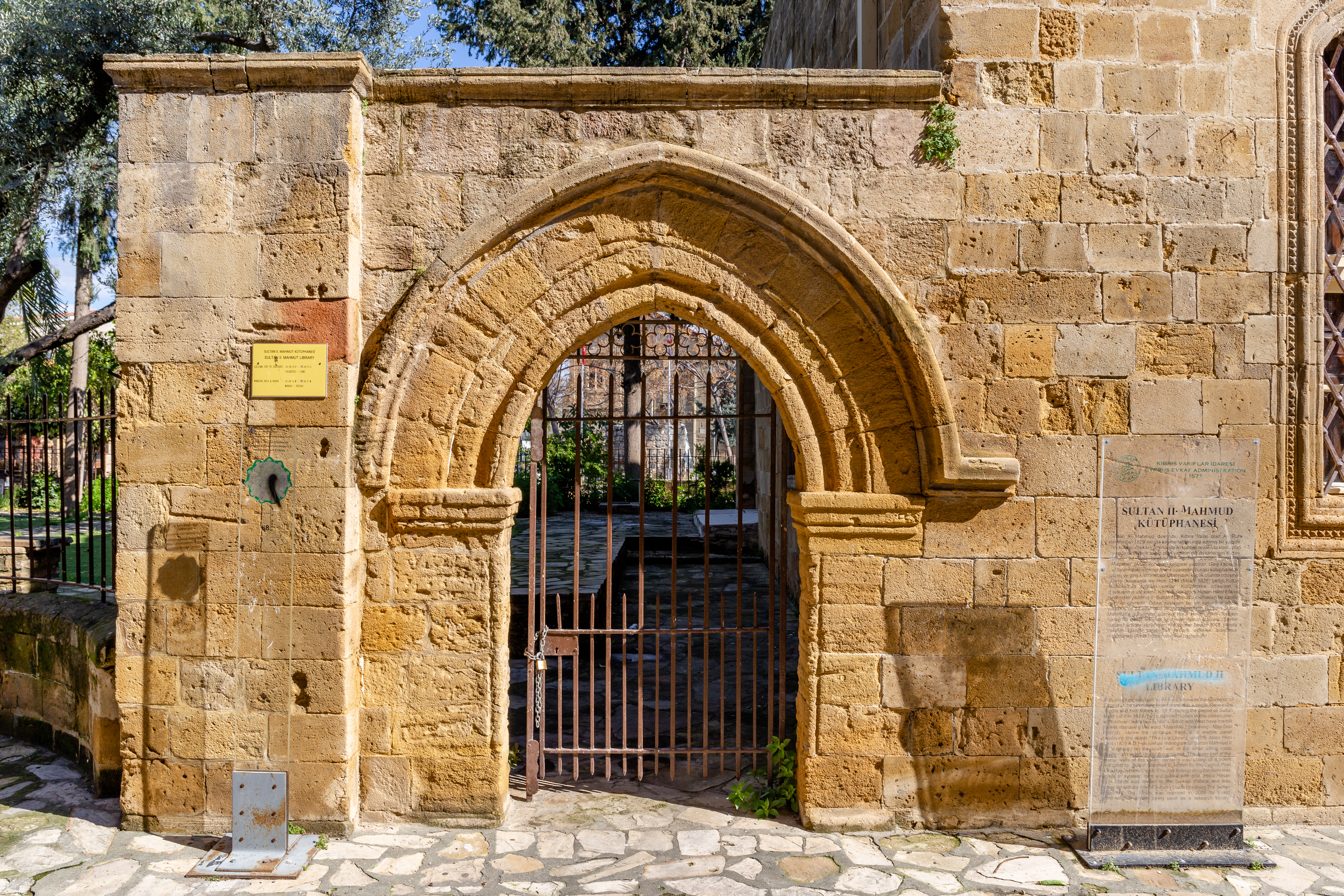
Sultan II. Mahmut Library, Nicosia, entrance portal.

== Manuscripts ==
The library collection is estimated to hold 2000 books in Arabic, Persian and Turkish dealing primarily with jurisprudence, scholastic theology, traditions and commentaries. The books are now held in the national archive in Kyrenia.
