= State Archives in Varna =

Archival institution in Bulgaria

- Държавен архив – Варна (Bulgarian)
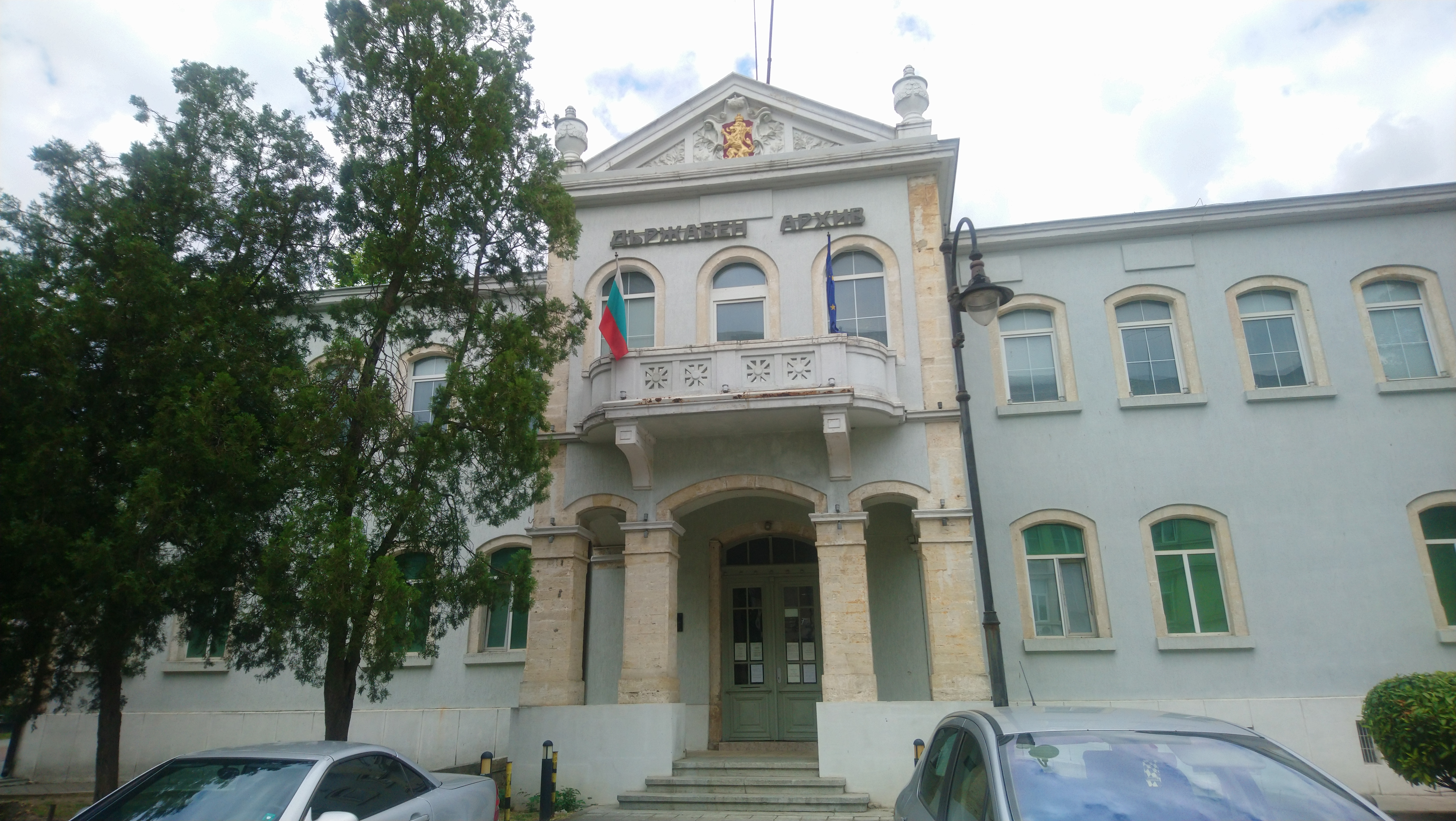
- Central building of the archive

Agency overview
- Formed: 1952; 74 years ago
- Jurisdiction: Government of Bulgaria
- Headquarters: Varna, Bulgaria; 43°12′16″N 27°54′42″E
- Parent agency: State Archive Fund
- Website: Official website

The State Archives in Vrna (Bulgarian: Държавен архив – Варна) is the primary public institution responsible for preservation of archival materials in Varna, Shumen, Dobrich and Targovishte in eastern Bulgaria. The archive was established in 1952. Since 1997 reconstruction the archive is housed in the city's oldest public building, originally constructed as a Turkish Konak. Following Bulgaria's Liberation in 1878, it served as the County Police Department. The building holds historical significance as the site where Prince Alexander of Battenberg proclaimed the Union of Bulgaria and Eastern Rumelia on September 6, 1885.
