= Geoffrey of Sergines =

French crusader and official in the Kingdom of Jerusalem (1205–1269)

Geoffrey of Sergines (c. 1205–1269) was a French crusader and a leading figure in the Kingdom of Jerusalem. He participated in the Barons' Crusade and later accompanied King Louis IX of France on the Seventh Crusade. He remained in the Latin East, attaining high offices in the Kingdom of Jerusalem. After becoming marshal and later seneschal, he came to represent royal authority in the kingdom as the lieutenant (bailli) of Queen Plaisance of Cyprus. Contemporary writers praised him as brave and impartial.

== Background ==
Geoffrey was born around 1205, a native of Sergines, a village north of Sens and close to Paris. His family held high offices in the Church: a brother was abbot of Saint-Jacques de Provins; an uncle, Peter of Sergines, became archbishop of Tyre; and Margaret of Sergines, abbess of Montivilliers, may have also been a relative. During his life in France, Geoffrey was known for his refined manners, kindness, and strong religious devotion. It may be his piety that led him to become close to King Louis IX. In 1236, he received a permission from his liege-lord, Count Hugh of Blois, to become the king's liegeman instead.

== Crusades ==
"He loved his liege-lord so much
That he went with him to avenge
The shame of God over the seas.
One ought to love such a prud'homme.
With the king he moved and went,
With the king he there remained,
With the king he bore good and ill.
There has never been such a man." — From La complainte de monseigneur Joffroi de Sergines, by Rutebeuf (1255/6)

Geoffrey probably arrived in Palestine on 1 September 1239 with the Barons' Crusade, led by King Theobald I of Navarre and Duke Hugh IV of Burgundy. He returned to France five years later. In 1248, he set out on the Seventh Crusade with king Louis IX of France. During Louis's rule in Damietta, Geoffrey sat on the king's council and was one of eight select companions who stood guard over the king. During negotiations for the exchange of the conquered Egyptian lands for Jerusalem, the Ayyubids demanded Louis as a hostage. Geoffrey was aghast, exclaiming in council that he would rather see the entire Christian army killed or captured.

After their defeat at the battle of Mansurah in 1250, Geoffrey alone ensured Louis's safe retreat; the king had fallen ill and was unable to ride, so Geoffrey took him to a cottage in the village of Mīt al-Khawlī 'Abd Allāh, north of Sheremsah. It was Geoffrey who handed the fortress of Damietta back to Muslims on 6 May 1250. Louis left for France in April 1254. Geoffrey remained in the Latin East as the commander of a special French contingent.

== Officer ==
Geoffrey became marshal of the Kingdom of Jerusalem in 1254 and then seneschal in either 1254 or 1258. He became one of the political leaders of the dwindling kingdom, which was then centered on Acre. Its titular king, Conradin, was a minor living in Europe, and the regency thus legally belonged to his heir presumptive, King Hugh II of Cyprus, also a minor. In their absence, effective authority alternated between the constable, John of Arsuf, and his cousin John of Jaffa. Geoffrey participated in raids across the kingdom's frontier, capturing a large caravan in January 1256 together with John of Arsuf.

In May 1259, after the death of John of Arsuf, King Hugh's mother and regent, Queen Plaisance, appointed Geoffrey—by then seneschal—to rule the kingdom as her lieutenant (bailli). The lack of monarchical authority allowed the nobles of the kingdom to act independently, however, and Geoffrey could probably only administer Acre and immediately adjacent lands. On 4 April 1263, Geoffrey was seriously wounded while fighting off Egyptian forces outside the walls of Acre. He remained Plaisance's lieutenant until her death in September 1261, when he became regent himself. He was lieutenant again from 1264 to 1267. He gained a reputation as an impartial but severe justiciar. He had many thieves and murderers hanged; and when a knight called John Renia killed the bishop of Famagusta, Stephen of Mezel, and took refuge in Acre's Pisan quarter, Geoffrey invaded and forced the powerful Italian merchants to hand over the murderer. Geoffrey worked with the papal legate, Thomas Agni of Lentino, to bring an end to the War of Saint Sabas, waged in the kingdom by Pisan and Genoan communities and their allies. Geoffrey was never praised for his intellect, but was successful in his various leadership roles.

In the early 1260s, Geoffrey traveled back to Europe, where he again took the cross and prepared to return to Palestine with a large force. In addition to commanding the French king's troops, he formed his own company. His dedication to the crusading movement almost bankrupted him; in 1263, Pope Urban IV asked the kings of France and Navarre to assist him with the proceeds of a market tax. Geoffrey's command abilities were tested during a campaign in Galilee in August 1266. Leading a section of the vanguard, he failed to prevent his troops from becoming isolated while searching for plunder. Muslim forces took advantage of their vulnerability, launching an ambush that resulted in heavy Christian casualties.

Urban's successor, Clement IV, also recognized Geoffrey's value to the crusader kingdom. The Holy See called him "the one and only minister in the defence of the Holy Land". Geoffrey's financial difficulties continued, however. In 1267, he considered leaving Palestine to sell his fiefs in France.

Geoffrey died on 11 April 1269. His son, also named Geoffrey, became a crusader as well and fought in southern Italy under King Charles I of Sicily.
