= Urban seismic risk =

Risk of earthquake damage

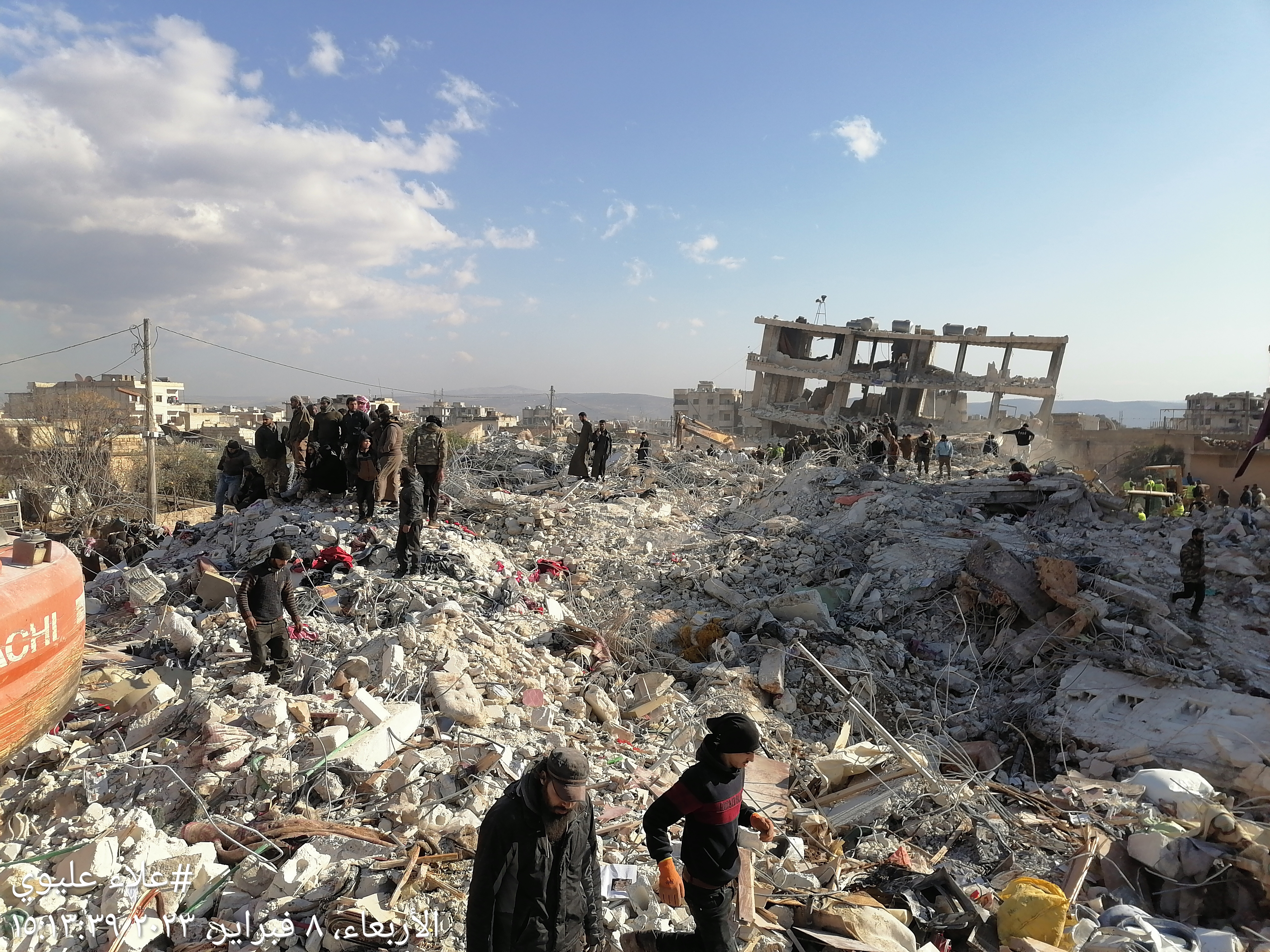
The town of Jindires in Syria after the 2023 Turkey–Syria earthquakes

Urban seismic risk is the risk of earthquakes damaging or destroying people and things in towns and cities. Even if a big earthquake is likely urban seismic risk can be minimized with good earthquake construction, and seismic analysis. One of the best ways to deal with the issue is through an earthquake scenario analysis. Earthquake engineering can reduce the risk.

== International projects ==
The IDNDR secretariat launched the RADIUS (risk assessment tools for diagnosis of urban areas against seismic disasters) initiative in 1996 to promote worldwide activities for the reduction of urban seismic risk, which experienced rapid growth particularly in developing countries, by helping to raise public awareness.

=== Urban risk and planning ===
One of the disaster risk reduction themes set forth by the United Nations International Strategy for Disaster Reduction project PreventionWeb, is urban risk and planning. This theme refers to the measurement and management of urban hazards and vulnerability in order to improve awareness and local capacity to effectively reduce disaster risk.

== Istanbul ==
Planning decisions affect architects. In earthquake-prone areas, all buildings built to 20th century standards may be dangerous, but shortly after the 1999 İzmit earthquake, which killed over 17 thousand people, a new seismic code was brought into force to protect against earthquakes in Turkey. That earthquake exposed many architectural design errors. Also following that earthquake a so-called earthquake tax was raised during the government of Bülent Ecevit. Initially thought as a temporary tax, it became permanent. In 2007 the seismic code was strengthened. However, it is alleged that builders often ignored the rules due to corruption. After the 2011 Van earthquakes Prime Minister Recep Tayyip Erdoğan said: "Municipalities, constructors and supervisors should now see that their negligence amounts to murder." In 2018, a zoning law gave amnesties to some unlicensed buildings and some with unlicensed floors.

Further resilience over the 2007 code was mandated in the 2018 Turkish Seismic Code, which took effect on 1 January 2019. Improvements included design supervision and site specific hazard definitions, and for new buildings in vulnerable regions required rebar in high quality concrete. Beams and columns in those buildings must be in the right place to properly absorb shaking. The code is said by foreign experts to be very modern and similar to US codes. However, these 21st-century building codes were not very well enforced.

In a bid to shore up support going into the 2018 Turkish presidential election, the government offered amnesties for violations of the building code, allowing non-compliance to continue with the payment of a fee. This poor enforcement of seismic codes was a contributing factor to the devastation of the 2023 Turkey–Syria earthquakes in which over 42,000 people died in Turkey. There were high incidences of support column failure leading to pancake collapses, which complicated rescue efforts. Experts lamented the practice would turn cities into graveyards. The 2023 Turkey–Syria earthquakes collapsed many older buildings and some recent ones. In the couple of months after those earthquakes a flurry of articles was published. A checklist for sustainable urban design has been created.

Unreinforced masonry buildings are vulnerable. Many older buildings in Istanbul are vulnerable to pancake collapses. Retrofitting old buildings is possible but expensive. Although over 3 million housing units nationwide were strengthened in the 2 decades before 2023, as of that year many apartment blocks do not meet 21st century standards. Building with wood has been suggested. Post disaster architecture in a village has been studied.

== Toronto ==
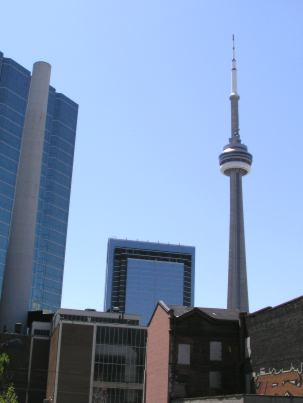
A mixed group of structures, with the CN Tower in the background to the right.

Cities are a mixture of old and new construction as in this picture. Note the old brick building mixed in with the new highrises, and the famous Toronto CN Tower. Similar to methodologies used in nuclear reactors, a seismic walkdown of the city is the best way to identify vulnerabilities and possible places for improvement.

Toronto is located on the shores of Lake Ontario, the site of much microseismicity. Toronto was struck by a 5.0 magnitude earthquake on June 23, 2010, and a 5.1 magnitude earthquake on May 17, 2013.

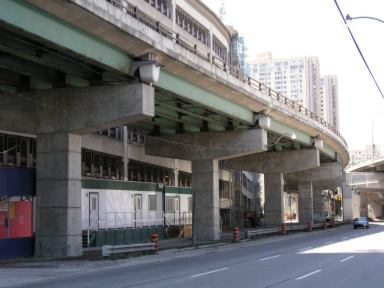
Gardiner Expressway, Toronto's elevated expressway

There are many places where the risk of seismic damage to older buildings is quite high. Old brick buildings on poor soils are highly vulnerable to earthquake damage, particularly when the mortar holding the bricks together has decayed. Problems increase if there is the possibility for soil or soil liquefaction.

Even in buildings which are capable of withstanding an earthquake without structural failure there may be risk to people due to interior hazards. Items such as suspended ceilings and light fixtures have almost no seismic ruggedness. Warehouse stores where heavy merchandise is stacked are a particular hazard.
