= Eustorge of Montaigu =

Archbishop of Nicosia (1210s–1250)

Seal of Archbishop Eustorge

Eustorge of Montaigu (Latin: Eustorgius) was a Latin churchman who served as the archbishop of Nicosia in the Kingdom of Cyprus from the mid-1210s until his death in 1250. He was an energetic leader who oversaw the completion of key church infrastructure in Nicosia as well as an increase in the church's wealth. He was involved in several crusades.

== Family ==
Eustorge was a scion of a noble family from Montaigut-le-Blanc in the French region of Auvergne. According to the records of the Auvergnat clergyman Pierre Audigier (1659–1749), Eustorge was the son of Peter and Alice. The family were heavily committed to the Crusades. His brothers Garin and Peter were grand masters of the military orders of the Knights Hospitaller and Knights Templar respectively, while Fulk was Bishop of Limassol in Cyprus. Their nephew Bernard was Bishop of Puy in France, while another nephew, Gerard, married the Cypriot heiress Eschiva of Montbéliard. A niece, Alice, married John, Lord of Caesarea.

== Pontificate ==
=== Early conflicts ===
Eustorge belonged to the secular clergy. He had become archbishop of Nicosia by 23 July 1217, possibly as early as 1215. His pontificate followed a period of disputes over the see of Nicosia between the church and the secular government of the Kingdom of Cyprus, and although he was canonically elected, the circumstances are unclear. He quickly moved to assert control over the cathedral chapters of his suffragans, the bishops of Famagusta, Paphos, and Limassol. Pope Honorius III endorsed the bishops' rights after a complaint from the bishop of Famagusta, Caesarius of Alagno, with whom Eustorge also came into dispute over tithes.

In late 1217, Eustorge accompanied King Hugh I to Syria on the Fifth Crusade, during which the king died. Hugh's infant son, Henry I, became the new King of Cyprus. Eustorge remained with the crusaders, accompanying the King of Jerusalem, John of Brienne, to Damietta in Egypt. This endeavor ended in Christian defeat in September 1221, after which the Cypriot contingent returned to Cyprus.

=== Regency dispute ===
King Henry's mother, Queen Alice, appointed her uncle Philip to rule Cyprus as her lieutenant. Holy Roman Emperor Frederick II, as suzerain of the kings of Cyprus, claimed the right to appoint his own lieutenant. To forestall an imperial intervention, the Ibelins arranged for Henry to be crowned at the age of eight in 1225; Eustorge performed the rite at the Cathedral of Saint Sophia in Nicosia. Queen Alice hoped to replace her uncle with her new husband, Bohemond V of Antioch. Their union displeased the emperor as well as Pope Honorius III, who had a poor relationship with the groom's father, Bohemond IV. In August 1225, Honorius ordered Eustorge to investigate whether Alice and Bohemond were too closely related to marry. Eustorge apparently stalled, perhaps viewing Bohemond as a welcome obstacle to the emperor. After pressure from Frederick, Honorius relieved Eustorge of this charge and transferred it to the Latin patriarch of Jerusalem, Gerold of Lausanne, and the bishop of Acre, James of Vitry.

Upon Philip's death in late 1227, his brother, John, took over the government of Cyprus. Frederick landed in Cyprus in July the next year, and a conflict—the War of the Lombards—ensued between him and the Ibelin faction. The Latin Church's attempts to mediate peace were unsuccessful. As royal authority weakened during the civil war, the Greek Church of Cyprus lost protection against the encroachments of the Latin Church. Around 1228, Eustorge imprisoned thirteen Greek monks of Kantara, brought to him by a Dominican priest, Andrew, and charged with heresy.

Eustorge's nephew Gerard was killed in battle on 14 July 1229. King Henry's bride, Alice of Montferrat, died under siege in 1230; her body was taken to Nicosia, where Eustorge conducted the funeral. In 1231, John's son Balian married Gerard's widow, Eschiva. Eustorge excommunicated the couple, citing their kinship. Balian chased Eustorge out of Cyprus, forcing him to take refuge in Acre in the Kingdom of Jerusalem. Pope Gregory IX was furious at the couple, writing to Eustorge that, "like a horse and a mule ... they were happy to fester in their own excrement". The contemporary Estoire de Eracles notes that "extensive landholdings on Cyprus" were at stake, and it is probable that Eustorge acted to preserve his family's interests.

=== Administration ===
Eustorge proved to be a vigorous leader of the Latin Church of Cyprus. His pontificate saw the completion of the Cathedral of Saint Sophia, which had begun under Archbishop Thierry in 1209, and he also began and oversaw the completion of an archbishop's palace in Nicosia. The church's wealth steadily increased during this period. The War of the Lombards drained the royal resources. Eustorge consequently obtained from the king two casalia, Timios Stavros by sale in December 1233 and Mandia by grant in January 1234. Eustorge and Balian appear to have reconciled by then, as Balian witnessed both transactions. After obtaining several estates, he made the church's first recorded purchase of revenues, buying from the king an annual income from the royal salt pans in 1236. From Acre, Eustorge advised King Theobald I of Navarre about the latter's impending campaign, the Barons' Crusade.

Eustorge worked to subordinate the Cypriot Greeks, insisting that no Greek priests should be ordained until they swore to obey the Latin Church and renounce contentious practices such as rejecting the use of unleavened bread in the eucharist. The higher clergy of the Greek Church of Cyprus then fled to Cilicia with their valuables, instructing the lower clergy to refuse Latin demands. In the 1240s, Pope Gregory IX instructed Eustorge to compel the Greeks and expel the dissidents with the help of the king, the nobles, and the Hospitallers.

According to the chronicler John of Jaffa, Eustorge was the vicar of the patriarch of Jerusalem and it was in Eustorge's presence that an assembly of the liegemen of the kingdoms of Jerusalem and Cyprus met in the patriarch's house in Acre on 5 June 1243 to discuss the claim of Queen Alice to the regency of Jerusalem. The lieutenant of the Venetian commune in Acre, Marsiglio Georgio, writes that the archbishop of Tyre, Peter of Sargines, was the vicar.

In May 1249, Eustorge joined King Henry and the knights of Cyprus on the Seventh Crusade, again travelling to Egypt. The archbishop died in Damietta on 28 April 1250, shortly after the Christian defeat.
