= Konak (residence) =

Ottoman-era mansion or manor

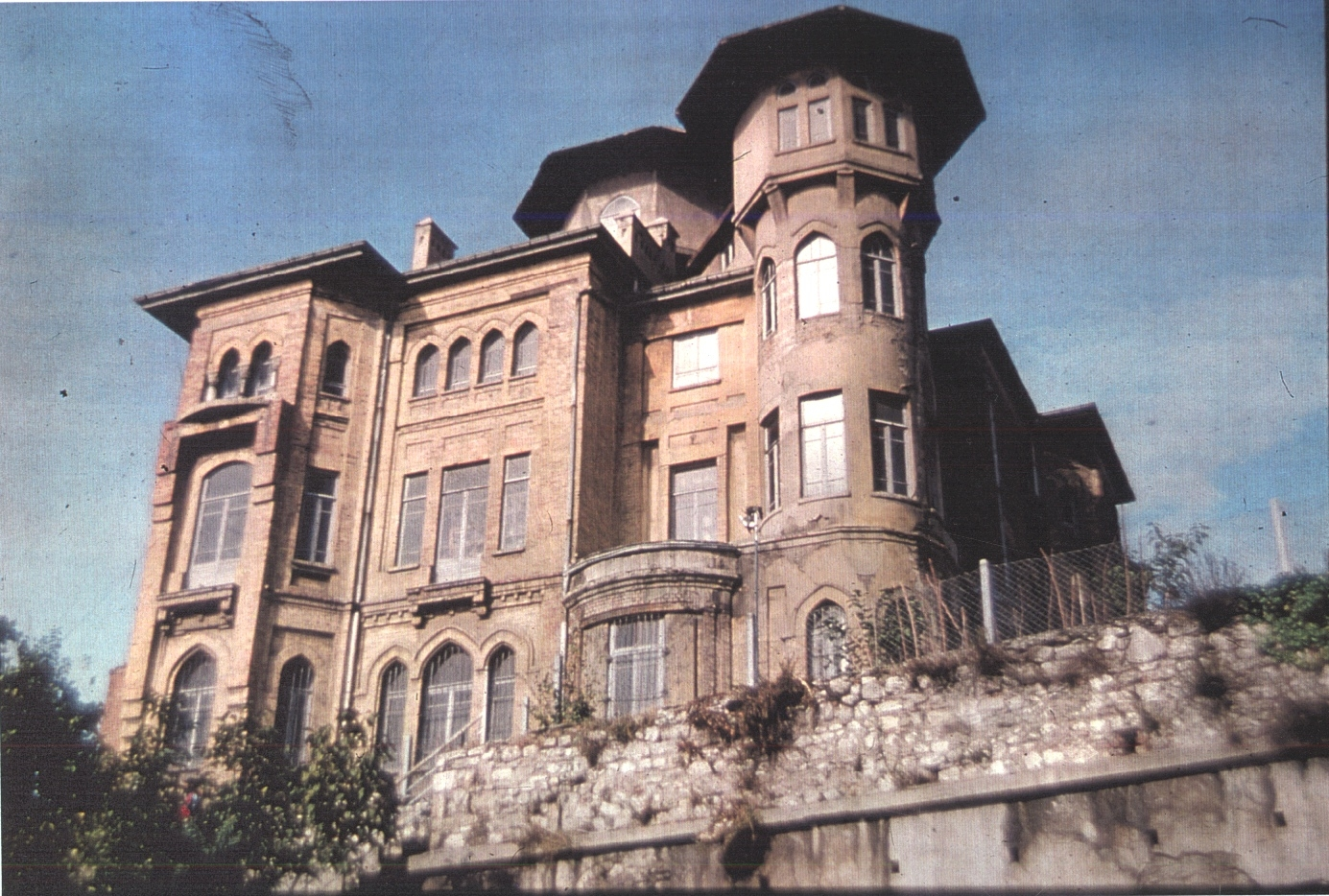
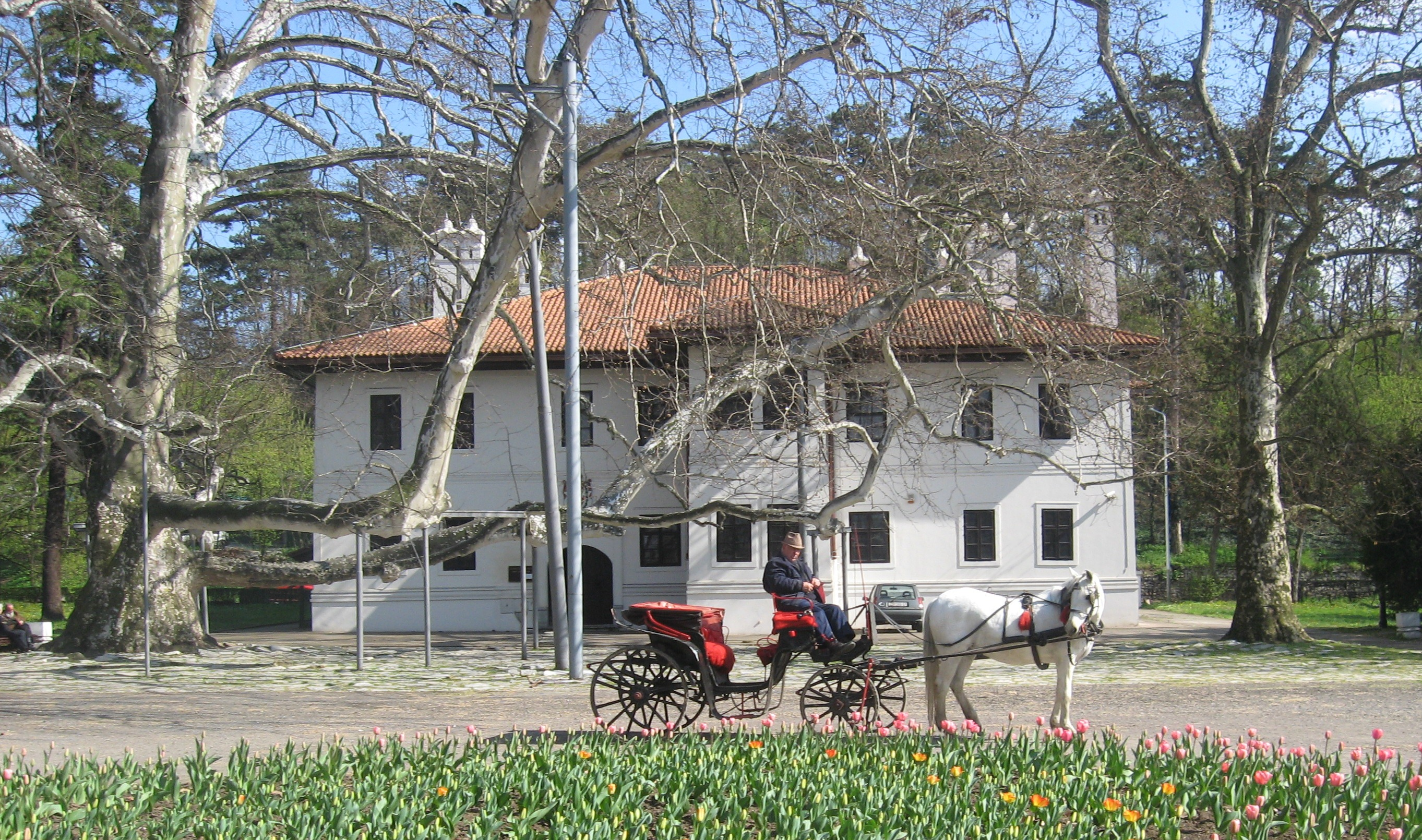
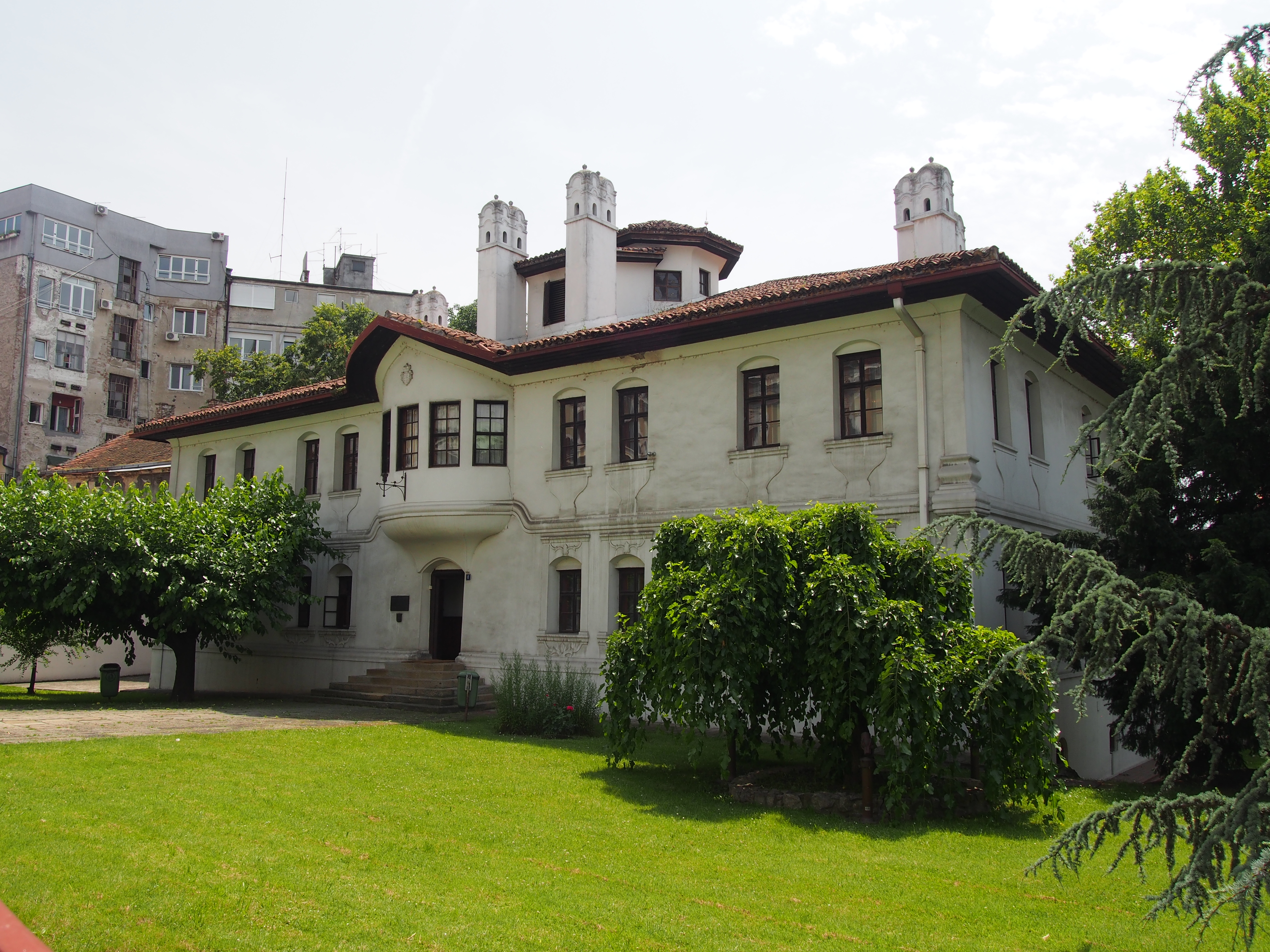
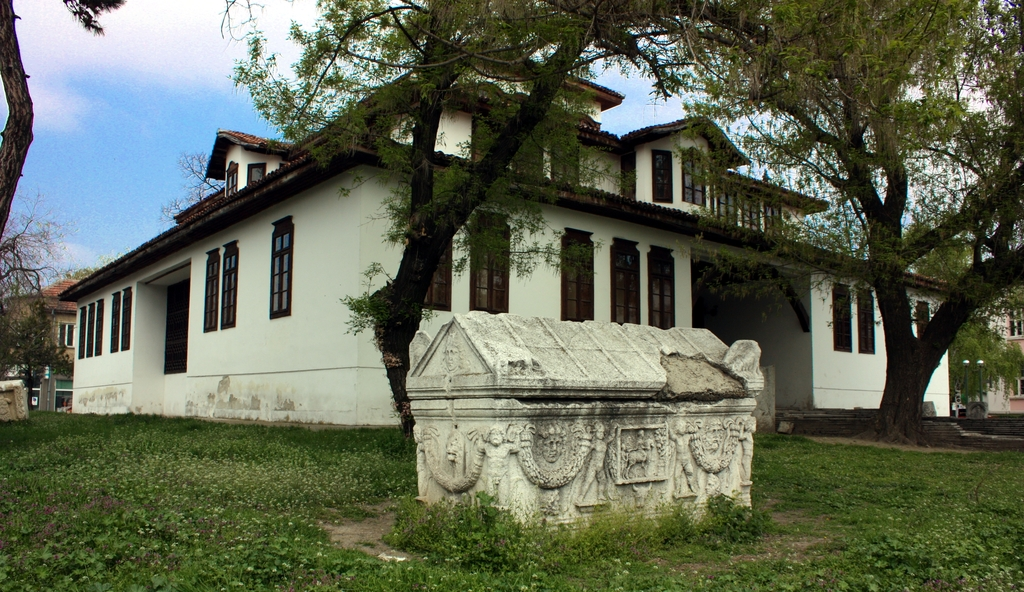
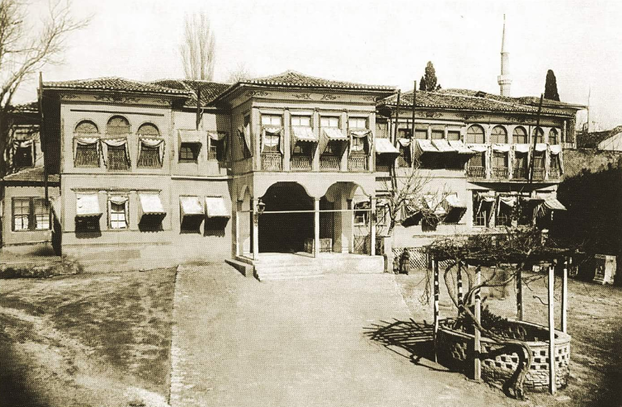
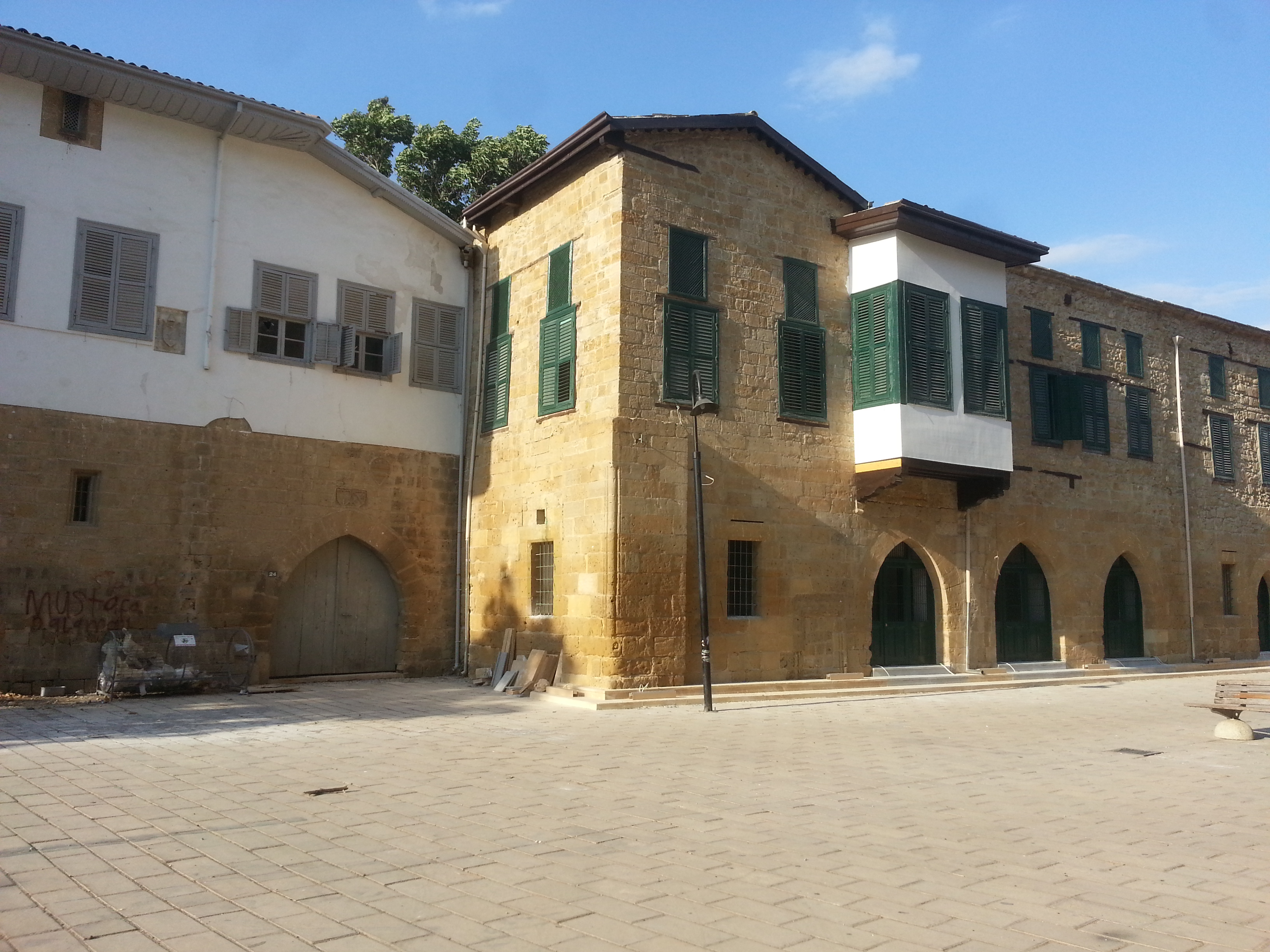
- Bulgur Palas Residence of Prince Miloš Residence of Princess Ljubica Konaka Museum Thessaloniki Government House, before 1891 Kadı Menteş Mansion

Konak (Turkish: konak, Greek: κονάκι, Serbo-Croatian: конак, Albanian: Konaku, Bulgarian: конак, Macedonian: конак) is a name for a type of house in Turkey and on the territories of the former Ottoman Empire, especially one used as an official residence for the elite members of the Ottoman society.

== History ==
The konak, a transnational Ottoman architectural style, was commonly referred to as a “Turkish house” in Europe, though it was not inherently tied to any single nation or religion in the Ottoman Empire. In the Ottoman Empire, konaks were prominent urban mansions, especially in Istanbul, which was considered home to the finest examples. After the empire’s fall, various nations rebranded konaks as part of their national heritage, often erasing their Ottoman roots. In Turkey, konaks were integrated into the national identity, while in places like Greece, their Ottoman elements were reinterpreted as Byzantine or Hellenic. The architect Le Corbusier admired Istanbul’s konaks, viewing them as exemplary during his 1911 travels.

== See also ==
- Architecture of Istanbul
- Imaret
- Sufi lodge
