= Seismic risk =

Likelihood of damage to a building or system from an earthquake

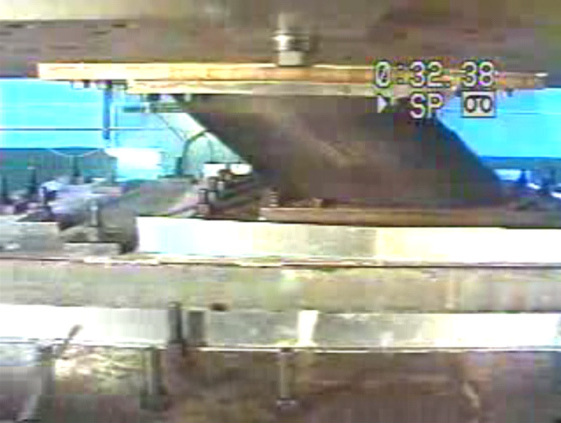
Lead rubber bearing being tested at the UCSD Caltrans-SRMD facility

Seismic risk or earthquake risk is the potential impact on the built environment and on people's well-being from future earthquakes. Seismic risk has been defined, for most management purposes, as the potential economic, social and environmental consequences of hazardous events that may occur in a specified period of time. A building located in a region of high seismic hazard is at lower risk if it is built to sound seismic engineering principles. On the other hand, a brick building on fill that is subject to liquefaction in a region of minor seismicity can be at higher risk.

A subset is urban seismic risk. Risk determination and emergency response can also be determined through the use of an earthquake scenario.

== Determination of seismic risk ==
The determination of seismic risk is the foundation for risk mitigation decision-making, a key step in risk management. Large corporations and other enterprises (e.g., local governments) analyze their 'portfolio' of properties, to determine how to best allocate limited funds for structural strengthening of buildings, or other risk reduction measures such as emergency planning. In calculating the risk of each facility in the 'portfolio', potential life safety and economic losses due not only to structural damage, but also to equipment, contents and business interruption are considered. Public agencies (local, state governments and federal agencies) similarly analyze their portfolios. The interconnections of infrastructures such as water, road and highway, and electric power systems are also considered. Insurance companies routinely employ estimates of seismic risk in their operations to determine appropriate insurance rates, monitor over-accumulation of policies in a small area, and purchase reinsurance. A simplified method of calculating seismic risk for a given city, involves the use of a street survey. If you know the level of seismic hazard, the damage generally follows established patterns.

Seismic risk is often determined using a seismic modeling computer programs which uses the seismic hazard inputs and combines them with the known susceptibilities of structures and facilities, such as buildings, bridges, electrical power switching stations, etc. The result gives probabilities for economic damage or casualties, for example the HAZUS computer program. While the results can be used as a general measure of seismic risk for types of buildings, the actual seismic risk for any individual building may vary considerably and will depend upon its exact configuration and condition. Acquiring and analyzing the specific data for an individual building or facility is one of the most expensive and daunting aspects of seismic risk estimation. Progress is made if one can calculate the 'fragility' or seismic capacity of the components within a structure.

In 1999, ASTM produced guidelines for reporting seismic loss estimates on commercial properties, commonly known as probable maximum loss or PML reviews. These guidelines specify the scope of work, qualifications of the reviewer, and proper nomenclature for reporting loss estimates.

== Reduction of seismic risk ==
Seismic risk can be reduced by active programs that improve emergency response, and improve basic infrastructure. The concepts of earthquake preparedness can help plan for emergencies arising from an earthquake. Building codes are intended to help to manage seismic risk and are updated as more is learned about the effects of seismic ground motion on buildings. This type of active improvement of mitigation of damage from earthquakes is known as seismic retrofit. However, the changes generally do not immediately improve seismic risk in a community since existing buildings are rarely required to be upgraded to meet the revisions.

== See also ==
- C. Allin Cornell
- Probabilistic risk assessment
