= Andrew of Rhodes =

Greek Dominican prelate and theologian

Andrew Chrysoberges, also called Andrew of Rhodes or Andrew of Colossus (died 1440), was a Greek Dominican prelate and theologian.

== Life ==
He was Greek by birth, and born to Eastern Orthodox parents. In early youth he had no opportunities for education, but afterwards devoted himself to Latin and Greek, and to theology, especially the questions in dispute between the Latin and Greek Churches. The study of the early Fathers, both Greek and Latin, convinced him that in the disputed points, truth was on the side of the Latin Church and converted from Orthodoxy to Catholicism, made a profession of faith, and entered the Dominican Order about the time of the Western Schism. He thenceforth led an apostolic life.

He was especially earnest in his efforts to induce other Eastern Orthodox to follow in his footsteps and convert to Catholicism. In 1413 he was made Archbishop of Rhodes. The Dominican biographer, Jacques Échard, credits him with having taken an active part in the twentieth session of the Council of Constance (1414–1418). Others maintain that there is here a confusion with Andrew of Colaczy, in Hungary.

At the Council of Basle, he delivered an oration in the name of the Pope (Mansi, XXIX, 468–481). He took part in the Council of Ferrara-Florence, and was one of the six theologians appointed by the papal legate, Cardinal Julian Cesarini, to reply to the objections of the Greeks. He argued that it was fully within the province of the Church to add the Filioque clause to the Creed, and that the Greek Fathers had been of the same opinion.

After the close of the Council, trouble arose between the Latins and Greeks in Cyprus; the latter accused the former of refusing to hold communion with them. Andrew was sent to Cyprus by Pope Eugene IV, and succeeded in establishing peace. He also succeeded in overcoming the local forms of the Nestorian, Eutychian, and Monothelite idea. The bishops following these ideas abjured and made a profession of faith at a synod held at Nicosia; some of the prelates went afterwards to Rome to renew their profession before the Holy See.

In the Vatican there are manuscript copies of his treatise on the divine essence and operation, compiled from the commentaries of Thomas Aquinas, and addressed to Cardinal Bessarion. Also preserved is a reply to a letter from Mark of Ephesus against the rites and ceremonies of the Roman Church (Patrologia Graeca, CL, 862).
