= Earthquake scenario =

Earthquake scenario is a planning tool to determine the appropriate emergency responses or building systems in areas exposed to earthquake hazards. It uses the basics of seismic hazard studies, but usually places a set earthquake on a specific fault, most likely near a high-population area. Most scenarios relate directly to urban seismic risk, and seismic risk in general.

Some earthquake scenarios follow some of the latest methodologies from the nuclear industry, namely a Seismic Margin Assessment (SMA). In the process, a Review Level Earthquake (RLE) is chosen that challenges the system, has a reasonable probability, and is not totally overwhelming.

Scenarios have been developed for Seattle, New York City, and many of the faults in California. In general, areas west of the Rockies use urban earthquakes of M7 (moment magnitude), and eastern cities use an M6.

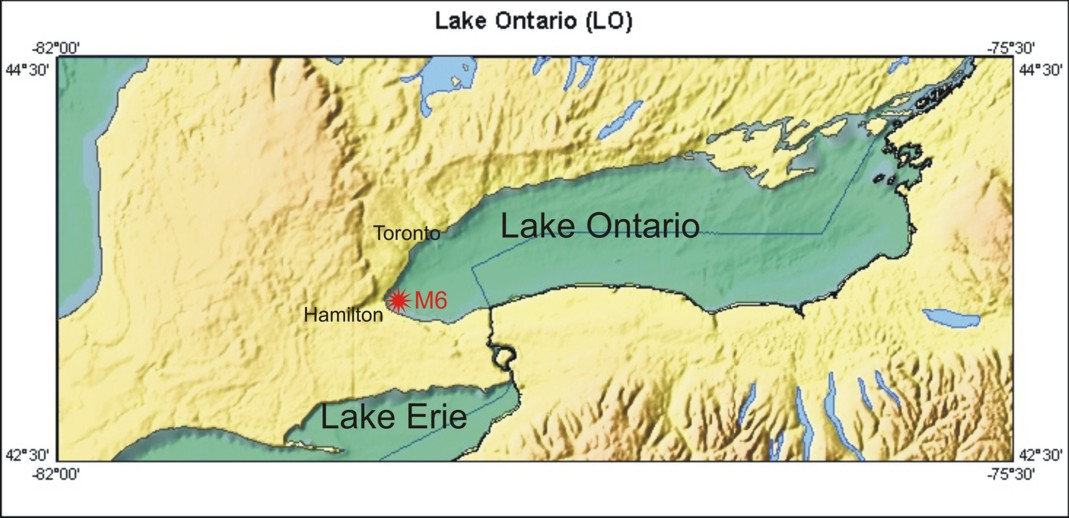
Reasonable RLE for Toronto area

Some eastern cities do not have an earthquake scenario. As an example, the Greater Toronto area in Ontario, Canada has a local seismicity with about as much a chance for an M6 as most of the moderate earthquake zones of Eastern North America (ENA), including New York City. As seen on the map, the RLE would be an M6 located in the western end of Lake Ontario. It could be suspected that the damage would follow the New York City scenario, with extensive damage to lifelines, and brick buildings on soft ground.
