= Archdiocese of Nicosia =

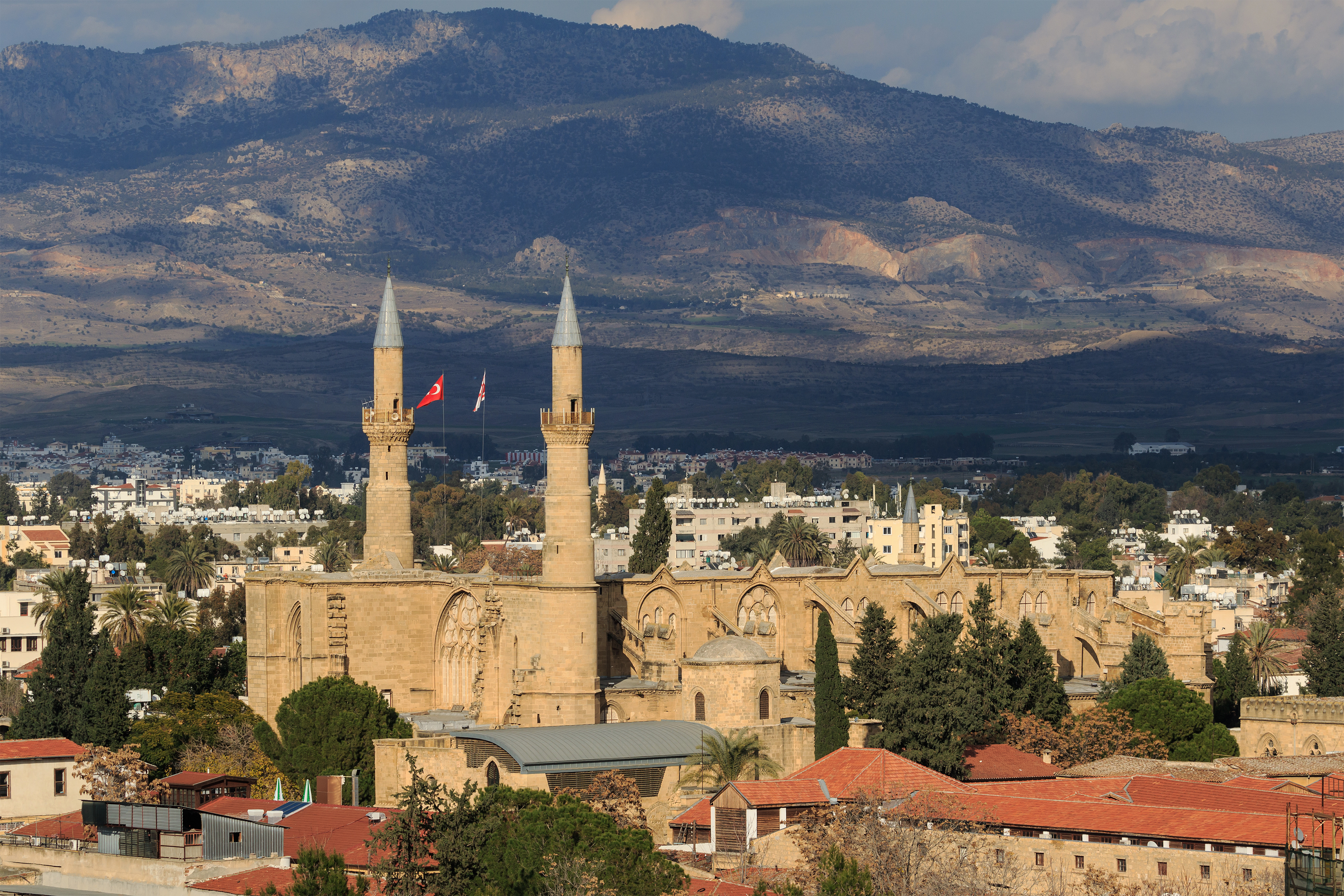
The Selimiye Mosque was formerly the cathedral of the Holy Wisdom

The Archdiocese of Nicosia was an archdiocese of the Latin Church in Cyprus, later becoming titular. According to the Catholic Encyclopedia 31 Latin archbishops served beginning in 1196, shortly after the conquest of Cyprus by Richard I of England, to 1502.

== List of archbishops ==
=== Resident ===
- 1196–1202 Alan
- 1206–1210/11 Thierry
- 1211 Durand
- 1217–1250 Eustorge of Montaigu
- 1251–1261 Hugh of Fagiano
- 1262 Giovanni Colonna
- 1267 Giles
- 1268 Jean d'Angoulême
- 1270–1273 Bertrand Bernardi
- 1278–1286 Ranulf
- 1280s Raphael
- 1288–1296 John of Ancona
- 1296–1303 Gérard de Langres
- 1303–? Henri de Gibelet (apostolic administrator)
- 1306–? Tommaso de Muro (apostolic administrator)
- 1308–? Pierre Erlant (apostolic administrator)
- 1311–? Pierre de Brie (apostolic administrator)
- 1312–1332 Giovanni Conti
- 1332–1342 Élie de Nabinal
- 1344–1361 Philippe de Chambarlhac
- 1361–1376 Raymond of Pradella
- 1376–1382 Béranger Grégoire
- During the Western Schism:

- Avignon obedience

- 1383–1406 Andrea Michelis

1411–1421 Hugues Lancelot de Lusignan (apostolic administrator)

- Roman obedience

- 1382/1383 – c. 1395 Luchino
- 1395–1402 Corrado Caraccioli
- 1402–1412 Stefano da Carrara

- 1421–1442 Hugues Lancelot de Lusignan
- 1442–1447 Galesius of Montolif
- 1447 Giovanni Moreli
- 1447–1451 Andrew of Rhodes
- 1456–1457 James of Cyprus (elect)
- 1456–1463 Isidore of Kiev (apostolic administrator)
- 1467–1469 Nicola Guglielmo Goner
- 1471–1476 Louis Fenollet
- 1476 Giovanni Francesco Brusato
- 1477–1438/1434 Vittore Marcello
- 1484–1495 Benedetto Superanzio (or Soranzo)
- 1495 Domenico Grimani (apostolic administrator)
- 1495–1502 Sebastiano Priuli
- 1502–1524 Aldobrandino Orsini
- 1524–1552 Livio Podocathor
- 1552–1557 Cesare Podocathor
- 1560–1586 Filippo Mocenigo

=== Titular ===
- 1728–1747 Raniero Felice Simonetti
- 1747–1773 Carlo Vittorio Amedeo delle Lanze
- 1775–1779 Giuseppe Vincentini
- 1791–1797 Giuseppe Rossi
- 1818–1826 Antonio Fernando Echanove Zaldívar
- 1828–1839 Filippo Maria Albertino Bellenghi
- 1832–1832 Giovanni Niccolò Tanara, became Archbishop of Urbino
- 1840–1862 Pietro Naselli
- 1877–1881 Stephen Petros X Azarian, became Patriarch of Cilicia
- 1882–1889 Elia Bianchi
- 1889–1904 Henry O'Callaghan
- 1905–1915 Cesare Boccanera
- 1915–1934 Francesco Cherubini
- 1934–1956 Guglielmo Piani
- 1957–1990 Aurelio Signora.
