= Great Madrasah, Nicosia =

Defunct school in Cyprus

The Great Madrasah (Greek: Μεγάλος Μεντρεσές Megálos Mentresés, Turkish: Büyük Medrese) was a madrasah (school) in Nicosia, Cyprus.

It was the first madrasah in Cyprus. Its building was built in 1573. It included classrooms and dormitories and a fountain was added in 1828. The building of the madrasah was demolished in 1936, but education continued until the 1939–40 academic year until finally being abandoned later in 1940.

It was donated by Ismail Aga, and owned by Evkaf Administration.
