= Anna Sforza =

Italian noblewoman (1476–1497)

Anna Maria Sforza
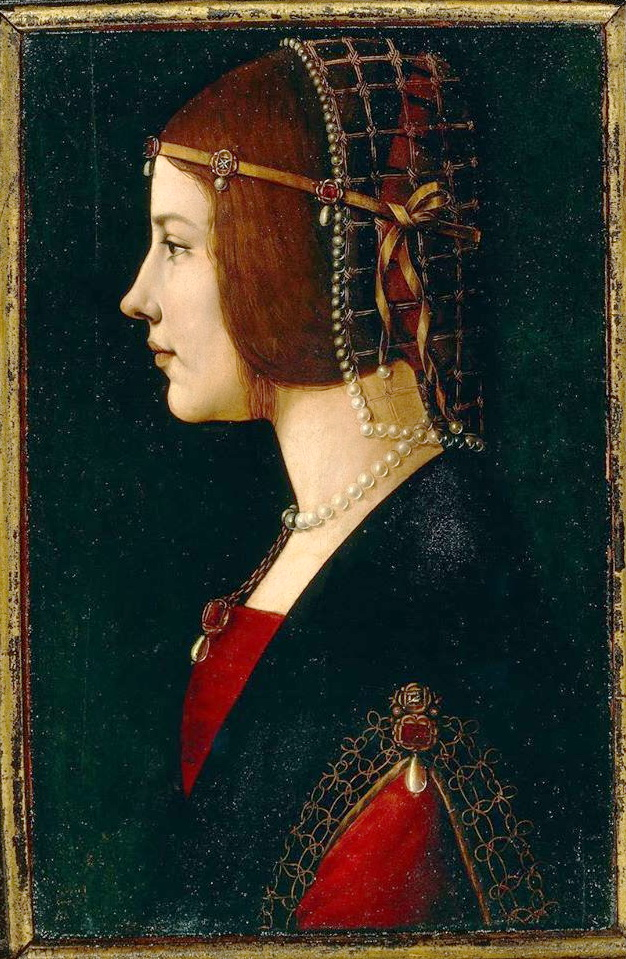
- Presumed portrait Ambrogio de Predis
- Born: 21 July 1476; Milan, Duchy of Milan, Italy
- Died: 30 November 1497 (aged 21); Ferrara, Duchy of Ferrara, Italy
- Spouse: Alfonso I d'Este, Duke of Ferrara (m. 1491)
Names
- Anna Maria Sforza
- House: Sforza
- Father: Galeazzo Maria Sforza, Duke of Milan
- Mother: Bona of Savoy

Anna Maria Sforza (21 July 1476 – 30 November 1497) was Hereditary Princess of Ferrara as the first wife of Alfonso I d'Este, future Duke of Ferrara. She was the second legitimate daughter of Galeazzo Maria Sforza, Duke of Milan, and his second wife, Bona of Savoy.

== Life ==
Born in Milan, she was the second daughter and last legitimate child of Galeazzo Maria Sforza, Duke of Milan, by his second wife, Bona of Savoy. Anna's paternal grandparents were Francesco I Sforza and Bianca Maria Visconti, and her maternal were Louis, Duke of Savoy and Anne de Lusignan of Cyprus, for whom she was named. She had two older brothers: Gian Galeazzo Sforza and Hermes Maria Sforza, Marquis of Tortona, and a sister, Bianca Maria Sforza, second wife of Maximilian I, Holy Roman Emperor.

When Anna was an infant, her father was assassinated inside the Church of Santo Stefano in Milan on 26 December 1476, which was the Feast Day of St. Stephen. He was stabbed to death by three high-ranking officials of the Milanese court.

In 1477, Anna was formally betrothed to Alfonso I d'Este, the heir of Ercole I d'Este, Duke of Ferrara. Her wedding with Prince Alfonso d'Este took place fourteen years later, on 12 January 1491, amidst banquets, receptions, and theatrical representations. However, the marriage was said to be unhappy. Some sources made claims implying that Anna was attracted to women, suggesting that Anna was 'unfeminine' (perhaps even dressing in men's clothes), preferred the company of women, and refused to consummate her marriage with sex; additionally, mention was made of Anna's deep attachment to a Black girl who was part of her entourage. The supposed unhappiness of the marriage, however, may also have been due to Alfonso's well-known reputation for extramarital affairs.

Only after six years of marriage, Anna became pregnant, but died in childbirth; while some sources reported that her child, a son, died immediately after being baptized; others, said that he survived and was named Alessandro, dying in 1514 aged 17. She was buried in the monastery of San Vito, of which Anna was a benefactor. Her husband was unable to take part of her funeral because at that time his face was disfigured as a consequence of syphilis.

Her death marked the end of the bond between the Sforza and Este families. Alfonso remarried, to Lucrezia Borgia, in 1502.
