= Bona of Savoy =

15th-century Duchess of Milan

Duchess consort of Milan
- Tenure: 22 July 1468 – 26 December 1476
- Born: 10 August 1449; Avigliana, Turin, Duchy of Savoy
- Died: 23 November 1503 (aged 54); Fossano, Duchy of Savoy
- Spouse: Galeazzo Maria Sforza (m. 1468; died 1476)
- Issue: Gian Galeazzo Sforza; Bianca Maria Sforza; Hermes Maria Sforza; Anna Maria Sforza
- House: Savoy
- Father: Louis, Duke of Savoy
- Mother: Anne of Cyprus

Bona of Savoy (10 August 1449 – 23 November 1503) was Duchess of Milan as the second wife of Galeazzo Maria Sforza (1444–1476), Duke of Milan. Following her husband's assassination in 1476, she served as regent of Milan for her son, Gian Galeazzo Sforza, during his minority from 1476 to 1481.

As regent, Bona played a significant political role in attempting to preserve the stability of the Sforza rule amidst internal power struggles. She was also the original patron of the lavishly illuminated Sforza Book of Hours, one of the finest surviving Renaissance books of hours.

== Life ==
=== Early life ===
Born in the old castle of Avigiana, Turin, Bona was a daughter of Louis, Duke of Savoy and Anne de Lusignan of Cyprus. She was one of nineteen children. Her many siblings included: Amadeus IX of Savoy, Philip II, Duke of Savoy, Louis of Savoy, Count of Geneva, Marguerite of Savoy and Charlotte of Savoy, who married King Louis XI.

Because of her sister Charlotte's marriage to the French king and them being orphaned after the death of their mother in 1462 and their father in 1465; Bona and her sisters were brought up at the French court. (Note: Retha Warnicke states Bona resided at the French court at the time of her proxy marriage to the duke of Milan.)

=== Duchess of Milan ===
In 1464, Bona was to have been betrothed to Edward IV of England, until his secret marriage to Elizabeth Woodville was revealed. She showed her resentment in later years by refusing to contemplate a marriage between either of her daughters and one of Edward's sons.

Bona married Galeazzo Maria Sforza on 9 May 1468 in a proxy marriage where Tristano Sforza the illegitimate half-brother of Galeazzo Maria stood in for the groom. The second marriage ceremony took place on July 5 of the same year.

As Bona and her retinue were traveling across the Alps to reach Milan on their entering the duchy Galeazzo Maria decided to play a trick on her and meet her but to pretend he was his younger brother Sforza Maria. Bona at first was fooled however by the hints of her companions and recognizing Galeazzo Maria from the portraits she had been sent got down from her horse and she and her new husband and "they embraced and kissed each other most thoroughly".

An alliance between the Sforza and the royal house of France had been rumoured from as early as 1460, and "in June 1464 Bona of Savoy was officially offered to Galeazzo by letters from the King of France and the Duke of Savoy".

=== Regent of Milan ===
Bona's husband was assassinated, on 26 December 1476 at the age of 32 by three young noblemen on the porch of the cathedral church of San Stefano in Milan. Galeazzo was succeeded after his 10-year reign by his 7-year-old son Gian Galeazzo Sforza (1469–1494). Bona relied on the enlightened competence of the ducal secretary Cicco Simonetta and was proclaimed regent on 9 January 1477 in the name of her son. Her position, which was strengthened by the able Simonetta, was however contested by her brothers-in-law, eager to control the will of the young duke.

These (among whom the ambitious Sforza Maria stood out) tried in May 1477 to oust Bona and Simonetta from the tutelage of Gian Galeazzo Maria, but Cicco Simonetta managed to precede and exile them (25 May). The revenge of the brothers-in-law, however, was not long in coming: helped by the leader Roberto Sanseverino, the young Sforza set up an army that invaded the Duchy, conquering Genoa and Tortona between 1478 and 1479. To facilitate their exploits was also the progressive fall from grace of Simonetta before the eyes of Bona. The latter, meanwhile, had embarked on a romantic relationship with one of her waiters from Ferrara, Antonio Tassino. It is not clear when the man became her lover, but after the death of Galeazzo Maria quickly acquired great power and enormous influence over Bona, thus becoming a personal enemy of Cicco Simonetta.

After the death of Sforza Maria, perhaps poisoned by Bona herself and Simonetta, Antonio Tassino persuaded his mistress to grant her other brother-in-law, Ludovico, the return to Milan, in the hope that this would be enough to free him from the uncomfortable presence of Cicco Simonetta.

Bona accepted his request and on 8 September, reconciled with his brother-in-law, effectively condemning the faithful Cicco Simonetta to the death penalty.

Most illustrious excellence, my head will be cut off and you will lose the state in the process of time.

— Cicco Simonetta in C. Santoro, Gli Sforza: la casata nobiliare, cit., pp. 213-214.

The sentence pronounced by Cicco Simonetta could only be true: although she still officially remained the regent, assisted by the new ducal chancellor Bartolomeo Calco, Ludovico 'il Moro' Sforza the political situation of the State in his hands. On 7 October 1480, in fact, Ludovico, under the pretext of protecting the life of his nephew from the aims of Antonio Tassino, had him transported to the "Rocchetta", the most impregnable area of the Castello Sforzesco, then forced his sister-in-law to fix the sentence to exile for Antonio Tassino and his family, who had to return to their homeland in Ferrara.

=== Later life ===
Due to the forced separation from her lover Antonio Tassino, Bona began to show signs of hysteria. She demanded to leave the duchy and return to Piedmont or France, where she had grown up, and threatened suicide when Ludovico Sforza and Roberto Sanseverino tried to prevent her, so that the two were forced to give in.

The little Gian Galeazzo signed a document with which he proclaimed his uncle Ludovico tutor in place of his absent mother, as it was arranged in the will of the deceased Galeazzo Maria in the event that Bona had not wanted or could not take responsibility for the regency. Ludovico Sforza thus concentrated almost all political power in his own hands.

Bona of Savoy commissioned the Sforza Book of Hours, which was painted in about 1490 by a famous court artist, Giovan Pietro Birago. She used the book, which contained devotional texts and is considered to be one of the most outstanding treasures of the Italian Renaissance.

== Issue ==
Bona and Galeazzo Maria had:

- Gian Galeazzo Sforza (20 June 1469 – 21 October 1494), married his first cousin Isabella of Naples (2 October 1470 – 11 February 1524), by whom he had issue, including Bona Sforza, Queen consort of King Sigismund I of Poland, who in her turn had six children.
- Hermes Maria Sforza (10 May 1470 – 18 September 1503), Marquis of Tortona.
- Bianca Maria Sforza (5 April 1472 – 31 December 1510), in January 1474, married firstly Philibert I, Duke of Savoy; (Note: Joni Hand states they were married in 1476.) on 16 March 1494, married secondly, Holy Roman Emperor Maximilian I, she had no issue by her two husbands.
- Anna Maria Sforza (21 July 1476 – 30 November 1497), married Alfonso I d'Este, later Duke of Ferrara. She died in childbirth.

== Sources ==
- Azzolini, Monica (2013). The Duke and the Stars: Astrology and Politics in Renaissance Milan. Harvard University Press.
- Fletcher, Stella (2013). The Longman Companion to Renaissance Europe, 1390-1530. Routledge.
- Hamilton, Keith; Langhorne, Richard (1995). The Practice of Diplomacy: Its Evolution, Theory, and Administration (2nd ed.). Routledge.
- Hand, Joni M. (2013). Women, Manuscripts and Identity in Northern Europe, 1350-1550. Routledge.
- King, Ross (2012). Leonardo and the Last Supper. Bloomsbury.
- Lubkin, Gregory (1994). A Renaissance Court: Milan under Galleazzo Maria Sforza. University of California Press. ISBN 978-0-520-91345-5.
- Warnicke, Retha M. (2000). The Marrying of Anne of Cleves: Royal Protocol in Early Modern England. Cambridge University Press.

Preceded by Dorotea Gonzaga	Duchess of Milan; 1468–1476	Succeeded by Isabella of Aragon, Duchess of Milan
