= Marie I of Saint-Pol and Soissons =

French princess (c. 1472–1547)

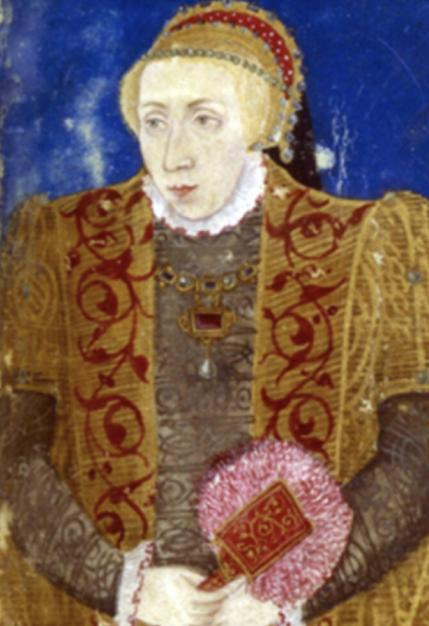
- Miniature of Marie (or her daughter Antoinette) depicted on the Catherine de'Medici hours
- Reign: 25 October 1482 – 1 April 1547
- Predecessor: Peter II
- Born: c. 1472
- Died: 1 April 1547 (aged 74–75); La Fère
- Noble family: Luxembourg
- Spouses: Jacques of Savoy, Count of Romont; Francis de Bourbon, Count of Vendôme
- Issue: With Jacques; Louise Françoise of Savoy; With Francis; Charles de Bourbon; François de Bourbon; Louis de Bourbon-Vendôme; Antoinette de Bourbon; Louise de Bourbon
- Father: Peter II of Luxembourg, Count of Saint-Pol and Soissons
- Mother: Margaret of Savoy

Marie of Luxembourg-Saint-Pol (c. 1472 — 1 April 1547) was the ruling Countess Regnant of Soissons and Saint-Pol between 25 October 1482 and 1 April 1547. She was additionally made Countess consort of Vendôme through her marriage to Francis, Count of Vendôme. After the death of her husband, she became regent of the County of Vendôme as the guardian of her son, Charles de Bourbon.

== Life ==
Marie was the elder daughter and principal heiress of Peter II of Luxembourg, Count of Saint-Pol and Soissons, and Margaret of Savoy, daughter of Louis I, Duke of Savoy. She belonged to the French cadet branch of a dynasty which had reigned as Dukes of Luxembourg, and whose senior line produced several Holy Roman Emperors before eventually becoming extinct in 1437.

Marie was first married as a child to her maternal uncle, Jacques of Savoy, Count of Romont. A commander in the army of Charles the Bold, he was deprived of his appanage, the Vaud, by Swiss armies sent by Berne and Fribourg. This happened shortly before Marie's prospects as an heiress were greatly diminished following the execution for treason of her grandfather, the French constable Louis de Luxembourg, Count of Saint-Pol, in 1475, a setback that entailed the sequestration of his property. She inherited the County of Soissons and the County of Saint-Pol after the death of her father in 1482.

Marie's status and part of her French inheritance were restored upon her remarriage to Francis de Bourbon, Count of Vendôme, a prince du sang, in 1487. Although she had a younger sister, Francisca of Luxembourg, who wed Philip of Cleves, Lord of Ravenstein, and her father had several younger brothers, she brought vast revenues and estates to the House of Bourbon. These included the counties of Saint-Pol and Soissons in Picardy, Ligny, and Marle, as well as the Château de Condé which was later passed down as a residence to the Princes of Condé: the descendants of her grandson, Louis de Bourbon, 1st Prince of Condé.

When her husband Francis died in 1495, she became guardian of their minor son and heir Charles. This entailed management of the lands he inherited from his father as well as her own. During this period, she enlarged the Collégiale Saint Georges, rebuilt the Church of Saint Martin and donated the Porte Saint Georges-aux-Bourgeois-de-Vendôme to become the Mairie.

Her great-granddaughter was crowned Mary, Queen of Scots, in 1542.

She died in 1547 in the château de Fère-en-Tardenois in Picardy, and was buried with her second husband in Vendôme.

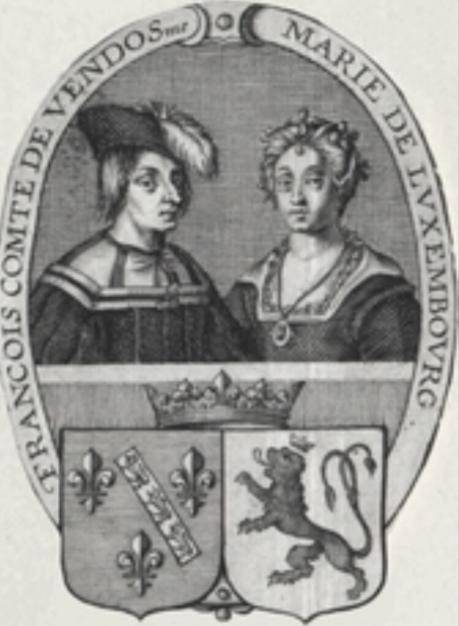
Marie depicted in an engraving with her second husband Francis.

== Issue ==
Marie's first marriage was to Jacques of Savoy, Count of Romont. They had:

- Louise-Françoise of Savoy (1485 –1511), died childless after her marriage to Count Henry III of Nassau-Breda.

Marie's second marriage was to Francis de Bourbon, Count of Vendôme. They had:

- Charles de Bourbon (1489 – 1537), Duke of Vendôme.
- François de Bourbon (1491 – 1545), Count of Saint Pol and Chaumont, and Duke of Estouteville.
- Cardinal Louis de Bourbon (1493 – 1557), Archbishop of Sens.
- Antoinette de Bourbon (1494 – 1583), married Claude, Duke of Guise
- Louise de Bourbon (1495 – 1575), Abbess of Fontevrault.

== Sources ==
- Busby, Keith; Freeman, M.J.; Houppermans, Sjef; Pelckmans, Paul, eds. (1993). Les Manuscrits de Chrétien de Troyes. Vol. 2. Rodopi.
- Carroll, Stuart (2011). Martyrs and Murderers: The Guise Family and the Making of Europe. Oxford University Press.
- Guenther, Ilse (1995). "Henry III of Nassau". In Bietenholz, Peter G.; Deutscher, Thomas Brian (eds.). Contemporaries of Erasmus: A Biographical Register of the Renaissance and Reformation. Vol. 2. University of Toronto Press.
- Potter, David (1993). War and Government in the French Provinces, Picardy 1470-1560. Cambridge University Press.
- Putko, Carole Ann (1996). The pursuit of power: Charles de Guise, Cardinal de Lorraine (1525-1574): A study in complexity, controversy, and compromise. University of Southern California.
- Thomson, Oliver (2009). The Impossible Bourbons: Europe's Most Ambitious Dynasty. Amberley Publishing Limited. ISBN 978-1-4456-3148-6.
