= Boniface III of Montferrat =

Margrave of Monferrato

Marquis of Montferrat
- Reign: 1483–1494
- Predecessor: William VIII Palaiologos
- Successor: William IX Palaiologos
- Born: 10 August 1426
- Died: 1494 (aged 67–68)
- Noble family: Palaeologus-Montferrat
- Spouses: Orvietana di Campofregoso; Helena of Brosse; Maria of Serbia
- Issue: William IX of Montferrat; John George, Marquis of Montferrat; Francesca of Montferrat
- Father: John Jacob of Montferrat
- Mother: Joanna of Savoy

Boniface III Palaeologus (10 August 1426 – 1494) was Marquis of Montferrat from 1483 until his death.

== Biography ==
Boniface was the son of marquis John Jacob and Joanna of Savoy. He succeeded his brother William VIII who had got involved in the War of Ferrara. When the conflict's eastern front settled, Boniface had to face the advance of the Dukes of Savoy. Boniface signed a treaty of non-belligerence, and had his niece Bianca married to Duke Charles I of Savoy. He also conceded to the latter the title of Montferrat in case he would die without a male heir.

This decision was spurred by the assassination of Scipione Palaiologos, the illegitimate son of John IV of Montferrat who tried to gain the throne, at Casale Monferrato by his relative Ludovico II, Marquis of Saluzzo, who was also a candidate to the succession. Boniface sided the House of Savoy in the war against Saluzzo of 1486, and occupied several lands in the Langhe belonging to Ludovico II.

Boniface married three times, the first with Orvietana di Campofregoso, daughter of Pietro Campofregoso, doge of Genoa. His second wife was Helena of Brosse, a daughter of John II of Brosse. His brother William would later marry her sister Bernarda of Brosse.

His third wife was Maria of Serbia, daughter of despot Stefan Branković of Serbia. He had two sons from his last marriage.

At his death, Boniface was succeeded by his eldest son William IX (1486–1518), who became Marquis of Montferrat between 1494 and 1518.
His other son John George (1488–1533) became the last Marquis of Montferrat between 1530 and 1533.

== Sources ==
- Arbel, Benjamin (2013). Intercultural Contacts in the Medieval Mediterranean: Studies in Honour of David Jacoby. Taylor & Francis.
- Cereia, Daniela (2018). "Femmes a la cour de Marguerite de Broubon (1438-1483) et Claude de Brosse, comtesses de Bresse (1471-1497)". In zum Kolk, Caroline; Wilson-Chevalier, Kathleen (eds.). Femmes à la cour de France: Charges et fonctions (XVe - XIXe siècle) (in French). Presses Universitaires Septentrion. pp. 227–238.
- Haberstumpf, Walter (2009). Regesti dei Marchesi di Monferrato (secoli IX-XVI). Alessandria: San Giorgio Editrice. ISBN 9788876790935.
- Ruggiero, Michele (1979). Storia del Piemonte. Torino: Piemonte in Bancarella.

Boniface III of Montferrat Palaeologus-Montferrat Cadet branch of the Palaiologos dynasty Born: 10 August 1426 Died: 1494
Regnal titles
Preceded by William VIII	Marquis of Montferrat; 1483-1494	Succeeded by William IX
