= Margaret of Savoy, Countess of Saint-Pol =

Margaret of Savoy

Margravine of Montferrat Countess of Saint-Pol and Soissons
- Tenure: December 1458 – 19 January 1464; 19 December 1475 – 25 October 1482
- Born: April 1439; Turin, Italy
- Died: 9 March 1484 (aged 44); Bruges
- Spouse: John IV, Margrave of Montferrat; Peter II of Luxembourg, Count of Saint-Pol and Soissons
- Issue: Marie of Luxembourg, Countess of Vendôme; Francisca of Luxembourg, Lady of Ravenstein
- House: House of Savoy
- Father: Louis I, Duke of Savoy
- Mother: Anne of Cyprus

Margaret of Savoy (April 1439 – 9 March 1484), also known as Marguerite de Savoie or Margherita di Savoia, was the eldest surviving daughter of Louis I, Duke of Savoy. She was the wife of Margrave John IV of Montferrat, and later the wife of Peter II of Luxembourg, Count of Saint-Pol, of Brienne, Marle, and Soissons.

The Savoy family coat of arms.

== Life ==
Margaret was born in April 1439 in Turin, Italy, the eldest surviving daughter and one of the nineteen children of Louis I, Duke of Savoy and Princess Anne of Cyprus. Her paternal grandparents were Amadeus VIII of Savoy, who was also the Antipope Felix V, and Mary of Burgundy. Her maternal grandparents were King Janus of Cyprus and Armenia and Charlotte de Bourbon.

== Marriages and issue ==
In December 1458 at Casale, she married her first husband, John IV, Margrave of Montferrat, the son of John Jacob of Montferrat and Joan of Savoy. He was a condottiere for the Republic of Venice during the Wars in Lombardy which were a series of conflicts fought between Venice and Milan, and their various allies. Margaret brought a dowry of 100,000 scudi, and in return received Trino, Morano, Borgo San Martino, and Mombaruzzo. The marriage was childless, and he died on 19 January 1464, leaving her a widow at the age of twenty-five.

Two and a half years later, on 12 July 1466, Margaret married her second husband, Peter II of Luxembourg, Count of Saint-Pol and Soissons, the second eldest son of Louis of Luxembourg, Count of Saint-Pol and Brienne and Jeanne de Bar, Countess of Marle and Soissons. They had:

- Louis of Luxembourg (died young)
- Claude of Luxembourg (died young)
- Antoine of Luxembourg (died young)
- Marie of Luxembourg, married firstly, her uncle, Jacques of Savoy, Count of Romont. She married secondly, Francis de Bourbon, Count of Vendôme
- Francisca of Luxembourg, Dame d'Enghien (died 5 December 1523), married Philip of Cleves, Lord of Ravenstein (died 28 January 1528).

== Death ==
Margaret died at Bruges on 9 March 1484 and less than six months after her husband Pierre, and she was buried at the Abbey of Happlaincourt. Margaret was survived by her two daughters, Marie and Françoise, her three sons having died in early infancy.

== Sources ==
- de Schryver, Antoine (2006). The Prayer Book of Charles the Bold: A Study of a Flemish Masterpiece from the Burgundian Court. The J. Paul Getty Museum.
