= Peter II, Count of Saint-Pol =

French nobleman (c.1440–1482)

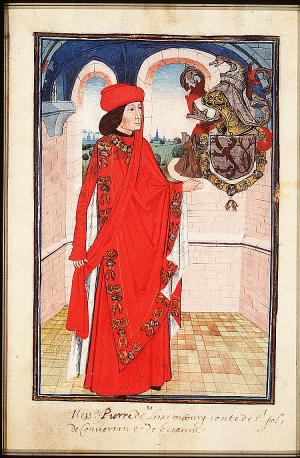
- Born: 1440; Aube, Champagne, France
- Died: 25 October 1482 (aged 33–34); Enghien, Hainaut
- Noble family: House of Luxembourg
- Spouse: Margaret of Savoy
- Issue: Marie of Luxembourg, Countess of Vendôme; Francisca of Luxembourg, Lady of Ravenstein
- Father: Louis de Luxembourg, Count of Saint-Pol
- Mother: Jeanne de Bar, Countess of Marle and Soissons

Peter II (Pierre de Luxembourg; c. 1440 – 25 October 1482) was Count of Saint-Pol, of Brienne, Marle, and Soissons.

== Biography ==
He was the second eldest son of Louis de Luxembourg, Count of Saint-Pol, and Jeanne de Bar, Countess of Marle and Soissons.

In 1478, Peter was made a knight of the Order of the Golden Fleece. Peter married Margaret of Savoy, the eldest surviving daughter of Louis I, Duke of Savoy and Princess Anne of Cyprus, sometime after 29 January 1464. They had five children, including:

- Marie of Luxembourg, who married firstly, Jacques of Savoy, Count of Romont, and secondly, François de Bourbon, Count of Vendôme.
- Francisca of Luxembourg, who married Philip of Cleves, Lord of Ravenstein.
