= John IV of Montferrat =

Maragrave of Montferrat from 1445 until his death

John IV, Marquis of Montferrat

Marquis of Montferrat
- Reign: 1445–1464
- Predecessor: John Jacob Palaiologos
- Successor: William VIII Palaiologos
- Born: June 24, 1413; Casale Monferrato
- Died: January 19, 1464 (aged 50); Casale Monferrato
- Noble family: Palaeologus-Montferrat
- Spouse: Margherita of Savoy
- Issue: Elena Margherita, wife of Victor Podebrady
- Father: John Jacob, Marquis of Montferrat
- Mother: Joanna of Savoy

John IV Palaeologus (Italian: Giovanni IV Paleologo) (June 24, 1413 – January 19, 1464) was the Margrave of Montferrat from 1445 until his death.

The eldest of four brothers and two sisters, he was born near Casale in the castle of Pontestura, to John Jacob of Montferrat and Joanna of Savoy, daughter of Amadeus VII (the Red Count of Savoy). During his father's unlucky war against Amadeus VIII of Savoy, he was imprisoned by the latter and used as hostage.

He fought as condottiere for the Republic of Venice in the war that ensued after the heirless death of Filippo Maria Visconti of Milan (see Wars in Lombardy). During his reign the Palaeologus family lost the throne of Constantinople, captured by the Ottoman Turks in 1453.

He set his mind rather belatedly to ensure the future of the dynasty, marrying Margherita of Savoy, daughter of Louis of Savoy and Anne of Cyprus, in Casale in December 1458. She brought a dowry of 100,000 scudi, receiving Trino, Morano, Borgo San Martino and Mombaruzzo in return. However they only had one daughter:

- Elena Margherita (1459 – 1496), who married Victor, Duke of Münsterberg.

He also had two illegitimate children :

- Sara (1462–1503) and Scipione (1463–1485).

John IV died, without legitimate heirs, in Casale on 19 January 1464; he was buried there alongside his father in the church of San Francesco. He was succeeded by his brother William VIII.

== See also ==
- Wars in Lombardy

== Sources ==
- "Giovanni IV", Dizionario Biografico degli Italiani, vol. LVI, Roma, 2000, pp. 131–135.

Preceded by John Jacob	Margrave of Montferrat; 1445–1464	Succeeded by William VIII
