= Pierre de Beauvau =

French noble, advisor to Charles VII (c.1380–1435)

Pierre I of Beauvau (c.1380 – 1435), baron of Beauvau, La Roche-sur-Yon and Champigny-sur-Veude, lord of Craon, of Sablé and Ferté-Bernard by marriage. He was an adviser for Charles VII, and chamberlain, counsellor, governor and lieutenant to dukes, Louis II, Louis III and René of Anjou.

== Biography ==
Born in 1380, Pierre was the son of Jean II de Beauvau and Jeanne de Tigny. A retainer of the House of Anjou, he accompanied Louis II to Italy and returned to Anjou in 1414. Pierre was governor of Anjou, Maine, Provence, and captain of Angers responsible for the defense of the city against the English during the Hundred Years War. He was delegated by Louis III of Anjou in 1429 to supervise the renovations to the castle of Tarascon, and captain of the tower of Taranto. Appointed ambassador to the King of Sicily, Pierre was often traveling through the fiefs and possessions of René d'Anjou, particularly in Sicily and Provence.

During Charles VI of France's instability, Pierre was appointed by Yolande d'Aragon, to be a governor to the dauphin, Charles. He spent months at a time with the dauphin both in Angers in 1413, and Tarascon in 1415. With Tanneguy du Chastel, Pierre was instrumental in getting dauphin Charles out of Paris, during the capture of the capital by the Burgundians on 29 May 1418. On 10 September 1419, Pierre was present at the meeting at Montereau, where John, Duke of Burgundy was murdered. By 1422, he was captain of Angers, and in 1429 was governor of Provence.

Pierre supported Louis III of Anjou's bid for the kingdom of Naples in 1424 and 1427, becoming governor of Calabria.

He died in 1435.

== Marriage ==
In 1415, he married Jeanne de Craon. She was the daughter of Pierre de Craon and Jeanne de Châtillon. They had:

- Louis de Beauvau (1416–1462), married Marguerite de Chambley, daughter of Ferry de Chambley and Jeanne de Launay
- Jean IV de Beauvau (1421–1503), married Jeanne de Manonville

== Sources ==
- Adams, Tracy (2010). The Life and Afterlife of Isabeau of Bavaria. The Johns Hopkins University Press.
- Bianciotto, Gabriel (1994). Le Roman de Troyle (in French). Vol. 1. Publication de l'Universite de Rouen.
- Coulet, Noël; Matz, Jean-Michel (2000). La noblesse dans les territoires angevins à la fin du Moyen Age. Actes du colloque international organisé par l'Université d'Angers-saumur, 3-6 juin 1998 (in French). Ecole française de Rome.
- Coville, Alfred (1974). La Vie Intellectuelle Dans Les Domaines D'Anjou-Provence de 1380-1435 (in French). Slatkine Reprints.
- Curry, Anne; Ambühl, Rémy (2022). A Soldiers' Chronicle of the Hundred Years War: College of Arms Manuscript M 9. D.S. Brewer.
- Emery, Anthony (2015). Seats of Power in Europe during the Hundred Years War: An Architectural Study from 1330 to 1480. Oxbow.
- Favier, Jean (2008). Le Roi René (in French). Fayard.
- Hanly, Michael G. (1990). Boccaccio, Beauvau, Chaucer: Troilus and Criseyde : Four Perspectives on Influence. Pilgrim Books.
- Kekewich, Margaret L. (2008). The Good King: René of Anjou and Fifteenth Century Europe. Palgrave Macmillan.
- Rohr, Zita Eva (2016). Yolande of Aragon (1381-1442) Family and Power: The Reverse of the Tapestry. Palgrave Macmillan.
- Spangler, Jonathan (2017). "Transferring Affections: Princes, Favourites and the Peripatetic Houses of Lorraine and Beauvau as Trans-Regional Families". In Haider-Wilson, Barbara (ed.). Internationale Geschichte in Theorie Und Praxis/International History in Theory and Practice (1st ed.). Austrian Academy of Sciences Press, Wien. pp. 635–664.
