= Francis, Count of Vendôme =

French prince du sang

Francis de Bourbon
- Count of Vendôme
- Posthumous engraving of Francis
- Born: c. 1470; Vendôme, Loir-et-Cher, France
- Died: 1495; Vercelli, Piedmont, Italy
- Spouse: Marie of Luxembourg
- Issue: Charles, Duke of Vendôme; François, Count of Saint-Pol; Louis, Archbishop of Sens; Antoinette, Duchess of Guise; Louise, Abbess of Fontevraud
- House: Bourbon-Vendôme
- Father: John VIII, Count of Vendôme
- Mother: Isabelle de Beauvau

Francis or François de Bourbon (c. 1470 – 1495), Count of Vendôme, was a French prince du sang.

== Life ==
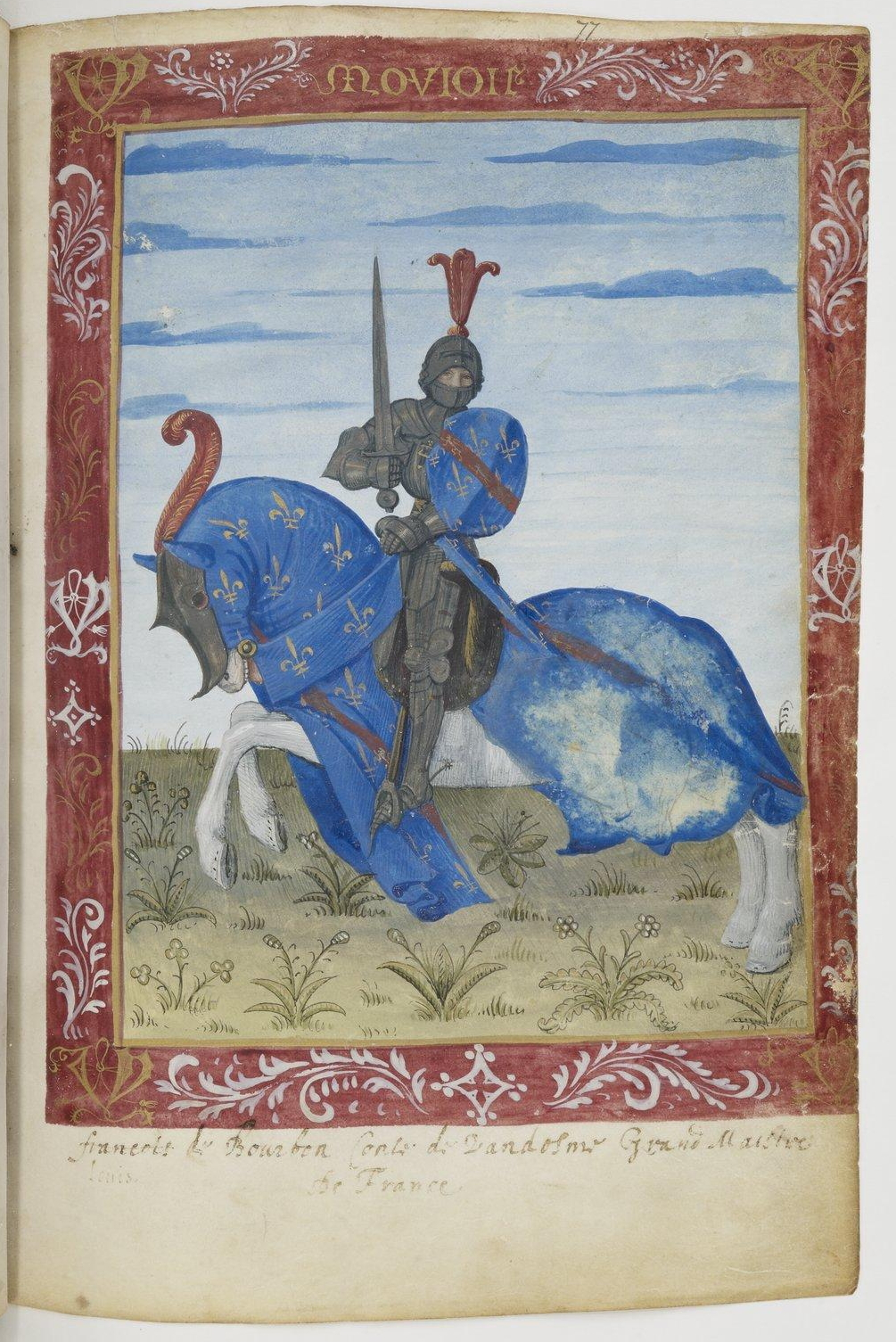
An apparent image (based on the writing on the bottom) of Francis, Count of Vendôme wearing battle armor while on horseback.

Francis was the son of John VIII de Bourbon, Count of Vendôme, and Isabelle de Beauvau, the daughter of Louis de Beauvau, Marshal of Provence. As a legitimate member of the House of Bourbon-Vendome, a cadet branch of the House of Bourbon, which itself was a cadet branch of the Capetian dynasty, he ranked in France as a prince du sang. Francis was seven when his father died, and he succeeded him as Count of Vendôme. During his minority, his estates were administered by his brother-in-law, Louis of Joyeuse.

== Marriage ==
On 8 September 1487, Francis married Marie of Luxembourg, the elder daughter and principal heiress of Peter II of Luxembourg, Count of Saint-Pol and Soissons, and Margaret of Savoy. She brought great estates as her dowry, including the countships of Saint-Pol and Soissons in Picardy, as well as the Château de Condé.

Francis and Marie had:

- Charles de Bourbon (1489–1537), who later became Duke of Vendôme.
- Jacques de Bourbon (1490–1491), died young
- François de Bourbon (1491–1545), Count of Saint Pol and Chaumont, and Duke of Estouteville
- Louis de Bourbon (1493–1557), Archbishop of Sens
- Antoinette de Bourbon (1493–1583), married Claude, Duke of Guise
- Louise de Bourbon (1495–1575), Abbess of Fontevraud

By Isabeau de Grigny, Francis had an illegitimate son:

- Jacques de Bourbon

Francis de Bourbon died at the age of 25 in Vercelli, Italy, and was succeeded by his eldest son, Charles de Bourbon. His widow Marie administered the family's estates during Charles' minority.

== Sources ==
- Barbier, Jean Paul (2002). Ma bibliothèque Poétique (in French). Librairie Droz S.A.
- Busby, Keith; Freeman, M.J.; Houppermans, Sjef; Pelckmans, Paul, eds. (1993). Les Manuscrits de Chrétien de Troyes. Vol. 2. Rodopi.
- Potter, David (1993). War and Government in the French Provinces, Picardy 1470-1560. Cambridge University Press.

Francis, Count of Vendôme House of Bourbon Born: 1470 Died: 30 October 1495
Preceded by Jean VIII	Count of Vendôme; 1477–1495	Succeeded by Charles IV de Bourbon
