= Louis de Beauvau =

French nobleman and diplomat (1416–1472)

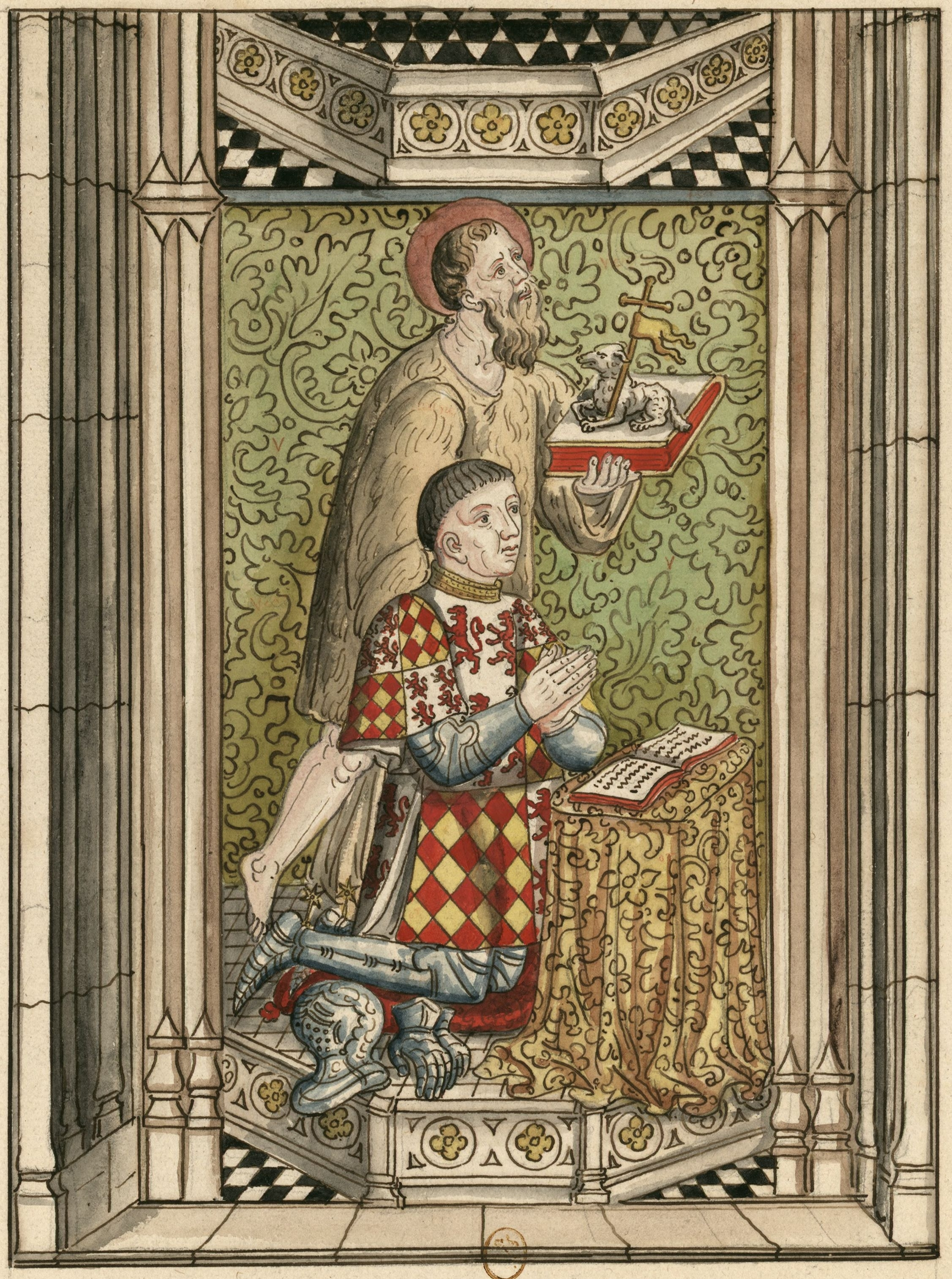
Louis de Beauvau

Louis de Beauvau (1416 – 1472), lord of Beauvau and Sermaise in Anjou. He was ambassador to Henry VI of England, retainer of the House of Anjou, and close friend of René of Anjou. He was made a knight of the Ordre du Croissant in 1448. On his final diplomatic mission in 1472 to Rome for René, he died.

== Biography ==
Born in 1416, Louis was the son of Pierre, Baron of Beauvau, and Jeanne de Craon, daughter of Pierre de Craon. Following the service to the House of Anjou by his father, Louis entered the employ of Duke René of Anjou. In 1431, Louis was appointed governor of Lorraine, by Duke René. Tasked with the mission of eradicating écorcheurs, he mastered the situation in a year and a half and brought peace to the duchy. Following this success, he was appointed Seneschal of Anjou, Grand Seneschal of Provence, and Rene's Premier Chamberlain. Louis's duties in Anjou included being curator of the University of Anjou.

In June 1447, Louis was part of a prestigious embassy sent to Henry VI of England from Charles VII of France, asking for the return of the county of Maine in return for an extension of the truce. Henry VI agreed and the county of Maine was returned to France by 15 March 1448. After such success, Rene honoured Louis by making him the first of his knights of the Ordre du Croissant in 1448.

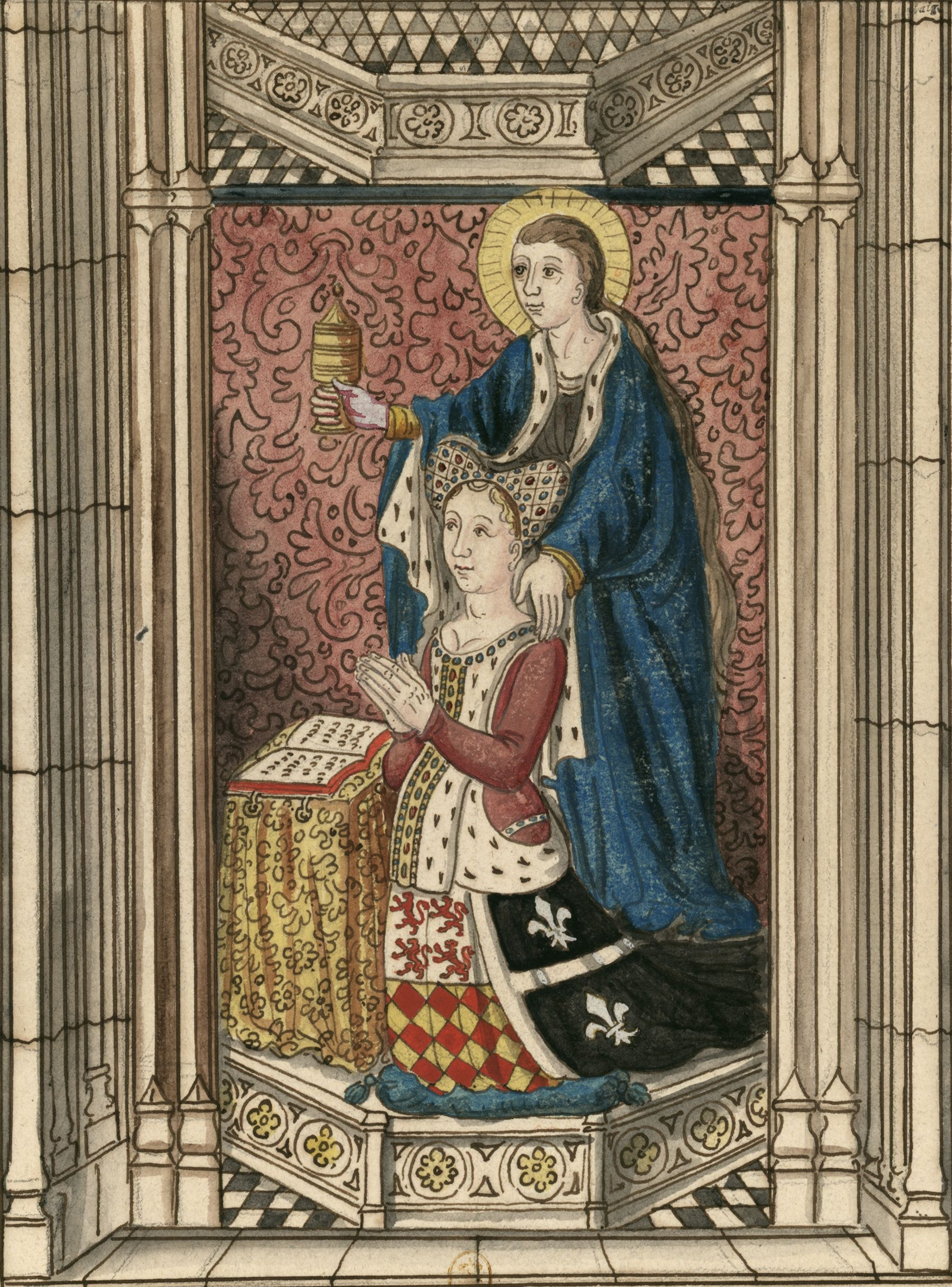
Louis first wife Margaret de Chambley

In 1459, as an envoy of Duke Rene and the Angevins, Louis traveled from the French court to Florence, negotiating with Piero de Pazzi. The bulk of Rene's money and contacts existed in this city. He was sent to Rome in 1472, to negotiate with Pope Sixtus IV, concerning Rene's rightful entitlement to the Kingdom of Naples. Louis died later that year in Rome.

== Family ==
Louis married twice. First wife:

Marguerite de Chambley, daughter of Ferry de Chambley and Jeanne de Launay, around 1435/1437, they had:
- Isabelle de Beauvau, b. 1437 who married John VIII, Count of Vendôme in 1454

Second wife:

Anne de Beaujeu daughter of Edouard de Beaujeu and Jacqueline de Lignières.

== Literature ==
Louis de Beauvau authored the poem:

- Le Pas de la bergiere, an account of the Pas de la Bergère tournament, which took place from 3–8 June 1449 on the former island of Jarnègues at Tarascon at Duke René's.
- Roman de Troyle et Criseida, the first French translation of Il Filostrato by Giovanni Boccaccio, around 1453-1455, is attributed to Louis. Other authors attribute this translation to his father Pierre de Beauvau.

== Sources ==
- Bianciotto, Gabriel (1994). Le Roman de Troyle (in French). Vol. 1. Publications de l'Universite de Rouen.
- Champion, Pierre (1911). Un "liber amicorum" du XVe siècle: notice d'un manuscrit d'Alain Chartier ayant appartenu à Marie de Clèves, femme de Charles d'Orléans (in French). Librairie ancienne Honoré Champion.
- Chaucer, Geoffrey (2013). Windeatt, B.A. (ed.). Troilus and Criseyde: "The Book of Troilus". Routledge.
- Cook, Theodore Andrea (1911). Old Provence. Vol. 2. Charles Scribner's Sons.
- Favier, Jean (2008). Le Roi René (in French). Fayard.
- Haug, Hélène (2013). "Maistre Pierre de Hurion, agille imitateur. Bilan sur les auteurs actifs à la cour de René d'Anjou (1434-1480)". Romania (in French). 521–522: 130–151.
- Kekewich, Margaret L. (2008). The Good King: René of Anjou and Fifteenth Century Europe. Palgrave Macmillan.
- Margolis, Oren Jason (2016). The Politics of Culture in Quattrocento Europe: René of Anjou in Italy. Oxford University Press.
- Perrier, Émile (1906). Les chevaliers du Croissant: essai historique et héraldique (in French). Imprimerie Lafolye frère.
- Spangler, Jonathan (2017). "Transferring Affections: Princes, Favourites and the Peripatetic Houses of Lorraine and Beauvau as Trans-Regional Families". In Haider-Wilson, Barbara (ed.). Internationale Geschichte in Theorie Und Praxis/International History in Theory and Practice (1st ed.). Austrian Academy of Sciences Press, Wien. pp. 635–664.
- Du Tillet, Jean (1994). Brown, Elizabeth A. R. (ed.). Jean Du Tillet and the French wars of religion: five tracts, 1562-1569. Binghamton University Press.
