= Isabelle de Beauvau =

French noblewoman (c. 1436–1475)

- Lady of Champigny and La Roche-sur-Yon; Countess of Vendôme
- Born: c. 1436
- Died: 1475 (aged 38–39)
- Burial: Saint-George collegiate church, Vendôme
- Spouse: John VIII of Vendôme (m. 1454)
- Issue more..: Jeanne, Duchess of Bourbon; François, Count of Vendôme; Louis, Prince of La Roche-sur-Yon
- House: Beauvau
- Father: Louis de Beauvau
- Mother: Marguerite de Chambley

Isabelle de Beauvau or Isabeau de Beauvau (around 1436–1475) was a French noblewoman of the Beauvau family, Lady of Champigny and La Roche-sur-Yon and Countess of Vendôme by her marriage to John VIII, Count of Vendôme.

== Early life ==
Isabelle was the only child of the marriage between Count Louis de Beauvau (1409-1492) and Marguerite de Chambley, a woman of noble birth from Lorraine. Due to the close relationship between her father and René d'Anjou, Isabelle was named after Isabella de Lorraine and occupied an important place at the court of René d'Anjou and was the god-mother of the future Louis XII.

Isabelle's lineage made her valuable to René of Anjou, who was dealing with a succession crisis over the duchy of Lorraine. He was trying to strengthen ties with Lorraine's nobility which is why her name appears with those of her mother and Yolande, Duchess of Lorraine, in a handwritten collection of poems by Alain Chartier offered to Marie de Clèves. Other than that not much is known about Isabelle's childhood; her marriage negotiations started before she was eighteen.

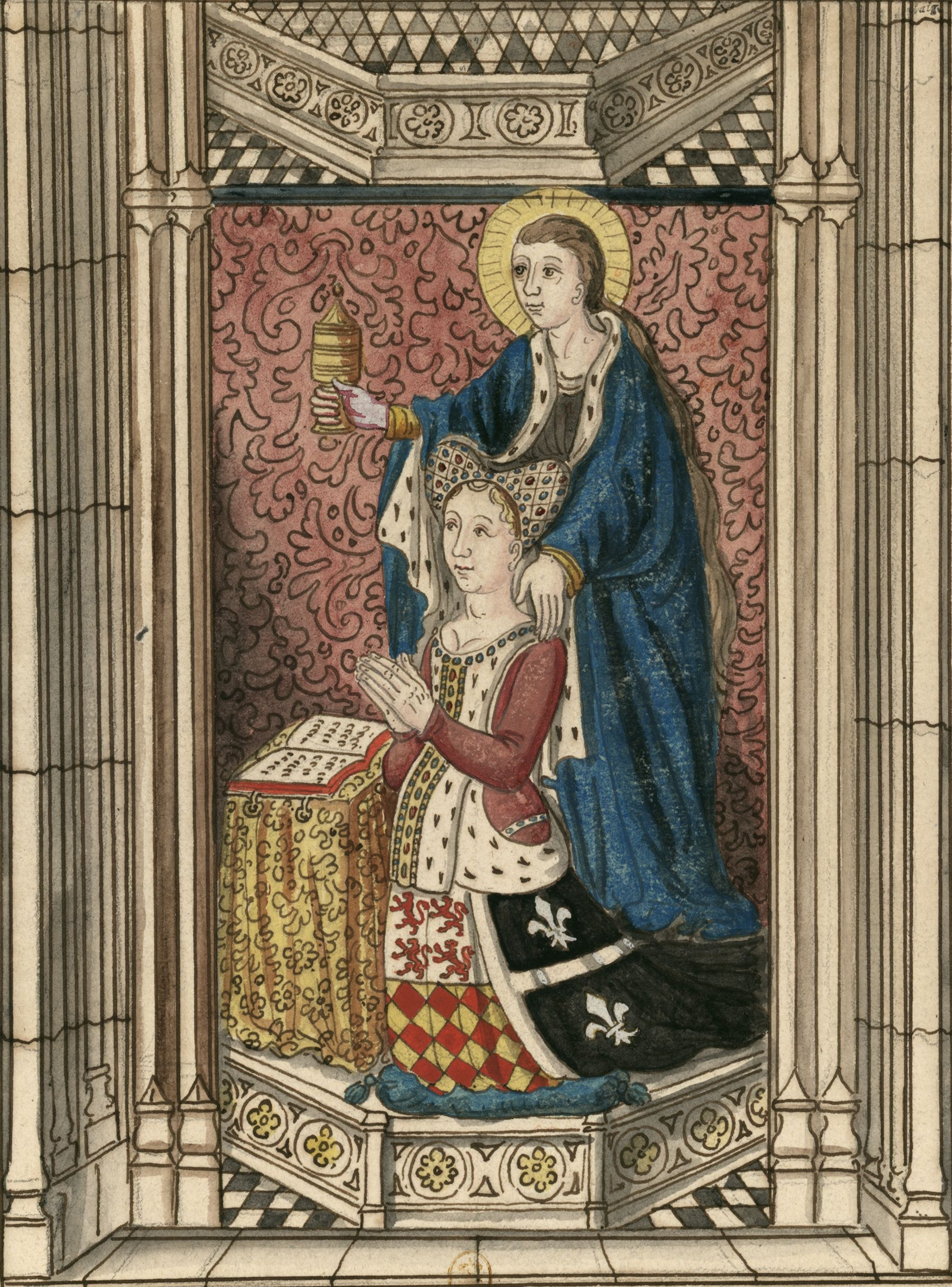
Isabelle's mother shown praying besides Saint Mary Magdalene

== Marriage and becoming Countess ==
Isabelle married John VIII, Count of Vendôme, on 9 November 1454 at Angers, thus becoming the Countess of Vendôme. Isabelle and John had:

- Jeanne (1460-1487); in 1478 she married Louis de Joyeuse (around 1450–1498);
- Catherine (1461-after 1525), married in 1484 to Gilbert de Chabannes, seneschal of Limousin;
- Jeanne de Bourbon (1465-1511), known as Jeanne la Jeune; she married 1) in 1487 Jean II of Bourbon, 2) in 1495 Jean IΙΙ, Count of Auvergne (through this marriage, she became the grandmother of Catherine de Médici); 3) in 1503 François de La Pause, baron of La Garde;
- Renée (1468-1534), abbess of the Trinity of Caen from 1491 to 1505, then from Fontevrault from 1505 to her death;
- François de Bourbon-Vendôme (1470-1495)
- Louis, Prince of La Roche-sur-Yon (1473-1520)
- Charlotte (1474-1520), married to Engilbert de Clèves, count of Nevers (1462-1506);
- Isabelle (1475-1531), abbess of the Trinity of Caen from 1505 to 1531

== Death and legacy ==
Isabelle's family's coat of arms

Isabelle died in 1475, giving birth to her last daughter. She is buried in the Saint-George collegiate church in Vendôme, the Bourbon Vendôme necropolis, which has since disappeared. Through her third daughter she was great-grandmother to the French nobility. She is most remembered for the poem by Alain Chartier to Marie of Cleves.

== Sources ==
- Barbier, Jean Paul (2002). Ma bibliothèque Poétique (in French). Librairie Droz S.A.
- Du Tillet, Jean (1994). Brown, Elizabeth A. R. (ed.). Jean Du Tillet and the French wars of religion: five tracts, 1562-1569. Binghamton University Press.
- McRae, Joan E. (2004). Alain Chartier: The Quarrel of the Belle Dame Sans Mercy. Routledge. ISBN 978-1-135-88853-4.
- Pasquier, Jean-Claude (2000). Le château de Vendôme: une histoire douce-amère (in French). Editions du Cherche-Lune.
- Perrier, Émile (1906). Les chevaliers du Croissant: essai historique et héraldique (in French). Imprimerie Lafolye frère.
