= Jeanne de Bourbon =

Jeanne de Bourbon may refer to:

- Jeanne de Bourbon, Queen of France (1338-1378), daughter of Peter I, Duke of Bourbon and Isabella of Valois, Duchess of Bourbon
- Jeanne de Bourbon, Duchess of Bourbon (1465-1511), daughter of Jean VIII, Count of Vendôme and Isabelle de Beauvau
