= Giovanna of Montferrat =

Giovanna Palaiologa
- Consort of the Marquisate of Saluzzo
- Tenure: 1479–1490
- Predecessor: Isabel of Montferrat
- Successor: Margaret of Foix
- Issue: Margaret

Juana Palaiologa of Montferrat, also known as Giovanna Paleologa of Saluzzo or Giovanna del Monferrato (Casale Monferrato, Alessandria, Piedmont, Italy, 1466 - Saluzzo, Cuneo, Piedmont, Italy, 1490), was an Italian noblewoman and a member of ruling families in two sovereign medieval states. She was the firstborn child of the Marquisate of Montferrat and consort of the Marquisate of Saluzzo.

== Biography ==
She was the eldest daughter of William VIII, Marquess of Montferrat, born from his first marriage to the Navarrese infanta Maria of Foix. As William VIII had no legitimate male heir, and feared that he would not have one in the future, since his only son was illegitimate, he arranged a dynastic marriage for his firstborn daughter in order to address the possible succession issue.

At the age of 13, in 1479, she married her cousin Ludovico II (1429 – 1504), Marquess of Vasto and Saluzzo and Count of Carmagnola, in Saluzzo. They had two children, but no surviving male heir.

After the death of William VIII in 1483, during the War of Ferrara, a conflict developed during the 1480s between Montferrat and Saluzzo over the succession rights to the Marquisate of Montferrat. These rights were disputed between Ludovico II of Saluzzo and Boniface III, Marquess of Montferrat, brother of William VIII and Giovanna's uncle.

Boniface secured the support of the House of Savoy by signing a non-belligerence treaty with Charles I, under which he gave his niece Bianca, Giovanna's sister, in marriage. He also promised the succession of the Marquisate of Montferrat in the event that he himself did not produce a male heir.

This alliance proved decisive, and Giovanna and Saluzzo did not obtain the crown of Montferrat, which remained in Boniface's hands.

== Issue ==
From her only marriage, to Ludovico II, she had the following children:

- Margaret, who married twice:
  - In 1496, Claudio Giacomo di Miolans, Count of Montmayeur and Lord of Armance.
  - In 1515, Pedro López de Ayala, Count of Salvatierra.
- A son (died at Revello, Saluzzo, 1490).

== See also ==
- Marquisate of Montferrat
- Marquisate of Saluzzo
- William VIII, Marquess of Montferrat
- Ludovico II of Saluzzo

States of the Italian Peninsula in the late 15th century. Saluzzo, Savoy, and Montferrat in the northwest.
