= John VIII of Vendôme =

French noble (c.1425 – 1477)

John VIII
- Count of Vendôme
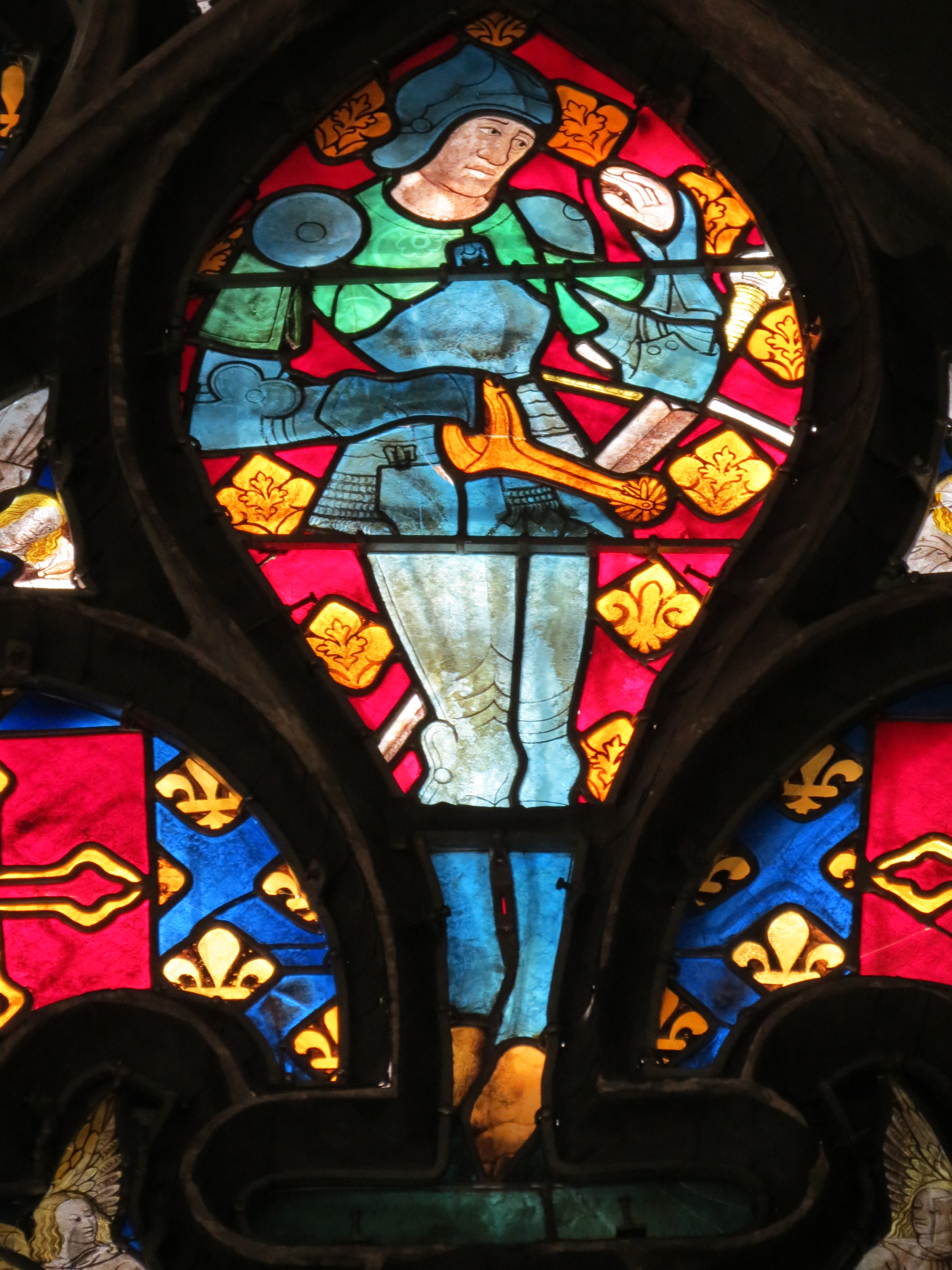
- Miniature attributed to Jean Fouquet, c. 1455
- Born: c. 1425
- Died: 6 January 1477 (aged 51–52); Lavardin
- Spouse: Isabelle de Beauvau (m. 1454; died 1475)
- Issue: Jeanne; Catherine; Jeanne of Bourbon, Duchess of Bourbon; Renée; François Count of Vendôme; Louis; Charlotte; Isabelle; Illegitimate: Louis; Jaques
- House: Bourbon-Vendôme
- Father: Louis, Count of Vendôme
- Mother: Jeanne de Laval

John VIII de Bourbon (c. 1425 – 6 January 1477) was a French prince du sang, as well as Count of Vendôme from 1446 until his death.

== Life ==
His coat-of-arms.

John was the son of Louis, Count of Vendôme, and Jeanne de Laval. As a courtier of King Charles VII of France, he fought the English in Normandy and Guyenne during the late stages of the Hundred Years' War. He attached himself to King Louis XI but was not in royal favor. He withdrew to the Château of Lavardin and completed its construction.

== Marriage and issue ==
In 1454, he married Isabelle de Beauvau, the daughter of Louis de Beauvau, Marshal of Provence, and Marguerite de Chambley. They had:

- Jeanne (1460-1487), married in 1477 to Louis of Joyeuse
- Catherine, married Gilbert de Chabannes
- Jeanne, married at first John II, Duke of Bourbon, and later John III, Count of Auvergne
- Renée, Abbess of Fontevraud
- François, Count of Vendôme (1470–1495)
- Louis, Prince of La Roche-sur-Yon
- Charlotte (1474-1520), married Engelbert, Count of Nevers
- Isabelle, Abbess of la Trinité de Caen

Jean also had two illegitimate sons:

- Louis, Bishop of Avranches
- Jacques, Governor of Valois and the Vendomois (1455–1524)

== Sources ==
- Barbier, Jean Paul (2002). Ma Bibliotheque Poetique (in French). Vol. 3–4. Librairie Droz.
- Antonetti, Guy (2000). "Les Princes Etrangers". In Bardet, Jean-Pierre (ed.). Etat et société en France aux XVIIe et XVIIIe siècles (in French). Presses l'Universite de Paris-Sorbonne.
- Durand, Yves (2000). Etat et société en France aux XVIIe et XVIIIe siècles: Mélanges offerts à Yves Durand. Presses de l'Université de Paris-Sorbonne. ISBN 9782840501510.
- Du Tillet, Jean (1994). Brown, Elizabeth A. R. (ed.). Jean Du Tillet and the French wars of religion: five tracts, 1562-1569. Binghamton University Press.
- Favier, Jean (2008). Le Roi René (in French). Fayard.
- Müller, Annalena (2022). From the Cloister to the State: Fontevraud and the Making of Bourbon France. Routledge.
- Potter, David (1995). Keen, Maurice (ed.). A History of France, 1460–1560: The Emergence of a Nation State. Macmillan.
- Ward, A.W.; Prothero, G.W.; Leathes, Stanley, eds. (1911). The Cambridge Modern History. Cambridge University Press.

John VIII of Vendôme House of Bourbon Born: 1426 Died: 6 January 1477
Preceded by Louis	Count of Vendôme; 1446–1477	Succeeded by François
