= William VIII of Montferrat =

Marquess of Montferrat

William VIII, Marquis of Montferrat
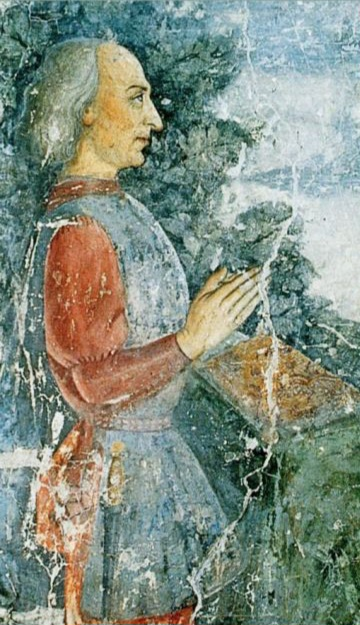

Marquis of Montferrat
- Reign: 1464–1483
- Predecessor: John IV Palaiologos
- Successor: Boniface III Palaiologos
- Born: 19 July 1420; Casale Monferrato
- Died: 27 February 1483 (aged 62); Casale Monferrato
- Noble family: Palaeologus-Montferrat
- Spouses: Marie de Foix (m. 1465; died 1468) Elisabetta Sforza (m. 1469; died 1472) Bernarde de Brosse (m. 1474)
- Issue: by Marie; Giovanna of Montferrat by Elisabetta; Blanche of Montferrat illegitimate Annibale; Lucrezia; Margherita
- Father: John Jacob, Marquis of Montferrat
- Mother: Joanna of Savoy

William VIII Palaiologos (Italian: Guglielmo VIII Paleologo; 19 July 1420 – 27 February 1483) was the Marquis of Montferrat from 1464 until his death.

William was the second son of Marquis John Jacob and Joanna of Savoy, daughter of Amadeus VI of Savoy. He inherited the Marquisate after the death of his elder brother John IV. He obtained, by Emperor Frederick III, the territories lost to Savoy from 1435. William served as condottiero for Francesco I Sforza of Milan and fought alongside him at the battle of Caravaggio(1448) and was afterwards rewarded with the lordship of Alessandria.

In 1449, William was accused of treachery and imprisoned by Francesco Sforza. The reason was said to because he had formed an attachment to Sforza's wife Bianca Maria Visconti. He was released a year later. Angry over his treatment by Sforza, William encouraged his brother John IV of Montferrat and relative Louis of Savoy to declare war on Sforza and Milan, and then he himself would lead the troops in battle. This attempt failed.

William later became a tutor to the couple's son Galeazzo Maria. Following his assassination, William held several positions in the Duchy of Milan.

== Marriages and issue ==
William had married three times:

- On 19 January 1465, he married Marie de Foix (1452–May 1468), daughter of Gaston IV, Count of Foix and Eleonor of Navarre. They had one child:
  - Giovanna of Montferrat (1467–1490). She married Ludovico II of Saluzzo.
- On 18 July 1469 he married Elisabetta Maria Sforza (1456–1472), daughter of Francesco Sforza, Duke of Milan, and Bianca Maria Visconti. They had one child:
  - Blanche of Montferrat (1472–1519), married Charles I of Savoy
- On 19 September 1474, he married Bernarde of Brosse (1450–1485), daughter of John II of Brosse and Nicole, Countess of Penthièvre. They no had children.

William had also at least three illegitimate children:

- Annibale (1460–1523), Lord of Frassinello and abbott of Lucedio;
- Lucrezia (died 1508), married firstly Giovanni Bartolomeo del Carretto and secondly Rinaldo d'Este, natural son of Niccolò III d'Este;
- Margherita, married Hector de Monteynard (murdered on 31 July 1501).

== Sources ==
- Cereia, Daniela (2018). "Femmes a la cour de Marguerite de Broubon (1438-1483) et Claude de Brosse, comtesses de Bresse (1471-1497)". In zum Kolk, Caroline; Wilson-Chevalier, Kathleen (eds.). Femmes à la cour de France: Charges et fonctions (XVe - XIXe siècle) (in French). Presses Universitaires Septentrion. pp. 227–238.
- Denieul-Cormier, Anne (1968). A Time of Glory: The Renaissance in France, 1488-1559. Doubleday.
- Gregory, Winifred Terni de (1940). Bianca Maria Visconti, duchessa di Milano (in Italian). Istituto Italiano d'Arti Grafiche.
- Lubkin, Gregory (1994). A Renaissance Court: Milan under Galleazzo Maria Sforza. University of California Press.
- Soler, Abel (2017). L’Europa cavalleresca i la ficció literària: La cort napolitana d’Alfons el Magnanim: el context de Curial e Guelfa (in Spanish). Vol. III. Publicacions de la Universitat de Valencia.
- Woodacre, Elena (2013). The Queens Regnant of Navarre: Succession, Politics, and Partnership, 1274-1512. Palgrave Macmillan.

Preceded by John IV	Marquis of Montferrat; 1464–1483	Succeeded by Boniface III
