= Teodoro Paleologo di Montferrato =

Italian cardinal

His Eminence Teodoro Paleologo di Montferrato
- Cardinal-Deacon of San Teodoro
- Church: Catholic Church

Personal details
- Born: 14 August 1425 Casale Monferrato, Italy
- Died: 21 January 1484 (aged 58)

Teodoro Paleologo di Montferrato (1425–1484) (called the Cardinal of Montferrato) was a Roman Catholic cardinal and bishop.

== Biography ==
Teodoro Paleologo di Montferrato was born in Casale Monferrato on 14 August 1425, the son of John Jacob, Marquess of Montferrat, and Princess Giovanna of Savoy, the daughter of Amadeus VII, Count of Savoy and sister of Antipope Felix V.

In his early career, he was a protonotary apostolic and served as dean of the cathedral church of Santa Maria di Saluzzo in Saluzzo.

Upon the recommendation of Paleologo's brother-in-law John II of Cyprus, Pope Paul II made him a cardinal deacon in the consistory of 18 September 1467. He arrived in Rome on 21 April 1468, and received the red hat in a public consistory. On 27 April he received the deaconry of San Teodoro. He left Rome on 1 May 1470.

He returned to Rome to participate in the papal conclave of 1471 that elected Pope Sixtus IV.

In 1475, he was elected Bishop of Casale and subsequently held this office until 1481. He split his final years between Rome, Piedmont, and Lombardy.

He died in Asti on 24 January 1481 after a minor injury became infected. He is buried in the church attached to Lucedio Abbey.

== See also ==
Catholic Church titles
Preceded by	Cardinal-Deacon of San Teodoro; 1468–1484	Succeeded by Federico Sanseverino
