= Louis de Bourbon-Vendôme =

French prince du sang and religious leader

His Eminence Louis de Bourbon-Vendôme
- Cardinal, Bishop of Laon
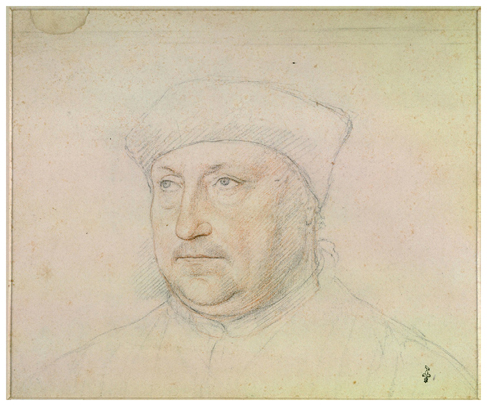
- Louis de Bourbon-Vendôme about 1530
- See: Laon
- Appointed: 24 April 1510
- Term ended: 23 March 1552
- Other post: Cardinal-Bishop of Palestrina (1550–57)
- Previous posts: Cardinal-Priest of Santa Sabina (1533–50); Cardinal-Priest of San Silvestro e Martino ai Monti (1521–33); Cardinal-Priest of San Silvestro in Capite (1517–21)

Orders
- Consecration: 3 May 1517 by Philippe de Luxembourg
- Created cardinal: 1 July 1517 by Pope Leo X
- Rank: Cardinal-Bishop

Personal details
- Born: 2 January 1493 Château de Ham, France
- Died: 13 March 1557 (aged 64) Paris, France
- Buried: Laon Cathedral

Louis de Bourbon-Vendôme (2 January 1493, in Ham, Picardy, France – 13 March 1557), was the son of Francis, Count of Vendôme and Marie of Luxembourg and a French prince du sang and religious leader.

== Life ==
He was the third son of François de Bourbon and Marie de Luxembourg, Countess of St. Pol, he was raised largely in the castle of La Fere, where his mother had come to reside after being widowed. He was godfather to Louis de Bourbon, Prince de la Roche-sur-Yon. He is sometimes called Francois-Louis, with Vendome Latinised as "Vendocimo".

He was the nephew of Cardinal Philippe de Luxembourg (1495) and Charles II of Bourbon (1476). He was the uncle of Cardinal Charles II of Bourbon (1548), and great-uncle of Cardinal Charles III of Bourbon (1583).

He studied at the College of Navarre, and became doctor of theology at the Sorbonne, he had become headmaster during the reign of Henry II. He was ordained priest in Faremoutiers by Cardinal Georges d'Amboise, Legate of France.

Elected Bishop of Laon on 24 April 1510 with an exemption because he had not reached the canonical age, he took his vows in front of King Francis I 9 June 1517 and was elevated to cardinal in the consistory of 1 July 1517; he was appointed as the first abbot of St. Denis in 1529, Archbishop of Sens in 1535, Father, Lord of Conde. He raised his nephew, Louis I de Bourbon, Prince de Conde.

He rebuilt the castle Anizy-le-Chateau, and build the Palais Bourbon. He was present at the coronation of Queen Claude of France in the abbey of Saint-Denis (10 May 1517), signed the marriage contract of Dauphin Francis with Mary of England.

He baptized Prince Francis (Fontainebleau, 2 February 1542) and Henry of Navarre (1554), celebrated the marriage of Madeleine of France (1520–1537) with James V of Scotland (Notre-Dame de Paris, 1 January 1536). He presided over the funeral of Louise of Savoy (18 August 1530) and of the king in the Abbey of St. Denis 23 May 1547. He crowned the queen Eleanor of Austria (5 March 1531) and Catherine de Medicis (Abbey of St. Denis, 10 June 1549).

He stood away from the elections of Pope Adrian VI (1521–22), Pope Clement VII (1523) and Pope Julius III (1549–1550), but was present at the election of Pope Paul III (1534), Pope Marcellus II (1555), and Pope Paul IV (1555). He took part in the war council of 18 February 1536 decided that the resumption of hostilities with Emperor Charles V. He presided over the convocation at Melun in 1548. In 1551 Henry II appointed him military governor of Picardy, and in 1552 Paris and the Ile-de-France.

He is buried in the chancel of the cathedral of Laon. Pierre Jumel pronounced his funeral oration.
