= Marie of Savoy, Countess of Saint-Pol =

Luxembourgish noble (1448–1483)

Marie of Savoy
- Countess of Saint-Pol, de Brienne, de Ligny, and Conversano
- Born: 20 March 1448
- Died: 9 March 1483 (aged 34); France
- Noble family: House of Savoy
- Spouses: Louis de Luxembourg, Count of Saint-Pol, de Brienne, de Ligny, and Conversano
- Issue: Louis of Luxembourg, Duke of Andria, and of Venosa, Prince of Altamura; Jeanne of Luxembourg; Margaret of Luxembourg
- Father: Louis, Duke of Savoy
- Mother: Anne de Lusignan of Cyprus

Marie of Savoy, Countess of Saint-Pol, de Brienne, de Ligny, and Conversano (20 March 1448 – March 9, 1483) was the second wife of Louis de Luxembourg, Count of Saint-Pol, Constable of France. She was the younger daughter of Louis, Duke of Savoy, and Anne de Lusignan, Princess of Cyprus, one of 19 children.

== Family and marriage ==
Marie was born on 20 March 1448, one of the 19 children of Louis, Duke of Savoy and Anne de Lusignan of Cyprus.

In 1454 at the age of six, she was betrothed to Filippo Maria Sforza (1448–1492), the son of Francesco I Sforza, Duke of Milan, and Bianca Maria Visconti. The contract was dated 13 December 1454. For reasons unknown, the betrothal was annulled, and he married instead his cousin, Costanza Sforza. In 1466 her younger sister Bona married Galeazzo Maria Sforza, the older brother of Filippo Maria.

In 1466, she married Louis de Luxembourg, Count of Saint-Pol, de Brienne, de Ligny, and Conversano, Constable of France (1418–19 December 1475). The marriage contract was dated 1 August 1466. She was his second wife, his first wife, Jeanne de Bar, Countess of Marle and Soissons having died in 1462. Together Louis and Marie had three children:

- Louis of Luxembourg, Duke of Andria, and of Venosa, Prince of Altamura (died 31 December 1503), married Eleanor of Guevara and Beaux, Princess of Altamura. He was Governor of Picardy and a Lieutenant General in the French Army.
- Jeanne of Luxembourg, a nun in Ghent
- Marguerite of Luxembourg, died 9/19/1553 Soissons-sur-Nacey, Cote d'Or, Bourgogne-Franche-Comte Francais.

Marie died 9 March 1483.

== Sources ==
- Bayer, Andrea, ed. (2008). Art and Love in Renaissance Italy. Yale University Press.
- Gregory, Philippa; Baldwin, David; Jones, Michael (2011). The Women of the Cousins' War: The Real White Queen And Her Rivals. Simon & Schuster.
