= Charlotte of Savoy =

Queen of France from 1461 to 1483

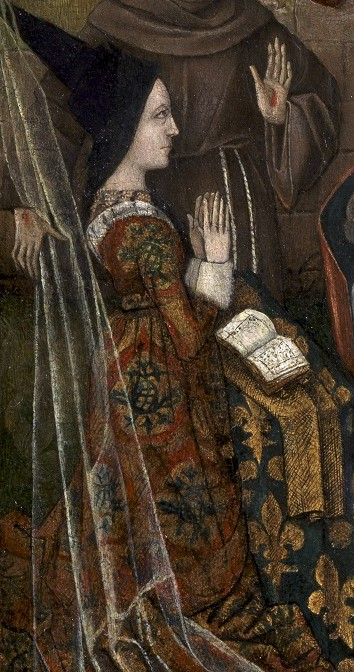
- Portrait of Charlotte of Savoy, c. 1472

Queen consort of France
- Tenure: 22 July 1461 – 30 August 1483

Queen regent of France
- Regency: 1465
- Monarch: Louis XI
- Born: c. 1441
- Died: 1 December 1483; Amboise, France
- Burial: Notre-Dame de Cléry Basilica, Cléry-Saint-André, France
- Spouse: Louis XI (m. 1451; died 1483)
- Issue: Anne, Duchess of Bourbon; Joan, Queen of France; Charles VIII of France
- House: House of Savoy
- Father: Louis, Duke of Savoy
- Mother: Anne of Cyprus

Charlotte of Savoy (c. 1441 – 1 December 1483) was Queen of France as the second wife of Louis XI. She served as regent during the king's absence in 1465 and was a member of the royal regency council during her son's minority in 1483.

== Life ==
Born c. 1441, (Note: Joni M. Hand, professor of Art History, indicates Charlotte was born c. 1443.) Charlotte was a daughter of Louis, Duke of Savoy and Anne of Cyprus. She was one of 19 children, 14 of whom survived infancy.

=== Marriage ===
On 11 March 1443, when Charlotte was just over a year old, she was betrothed to Frederick of Saxony (28 August 1439- 23 December 1451), eldest son of Frederick II, Elector of Saxony. The betrothal did not lead to a marriage, however, and was annulled for reasons unknown. The younger Frederick died at the age of 12. On 14 February 1451, 10 months before Frederick's death, Charlotte married Louis, Dauphin of France (future Louis XI), eldest son of Charles VII of France and Marie of Anjou. The bride was nine years old and the groom twenty-seven. The marriage, which had taken place without the consent of the French king, was Louis' second; his first spouse, Margaret of Scotland, had died childless in 1445. Upon her marriage, Charlotte became Dauphine of France.

Louis reportedly neglected her. When the news of his succession to the throne of France reached the couple at the Burgundian court, he immediately abandoned her in Burgundy to secure his inheritance, leaving her dependent upon Isabella of Bourbon to borrow the carts and entourage necessary to travel to France to join him.

=== Queen ===
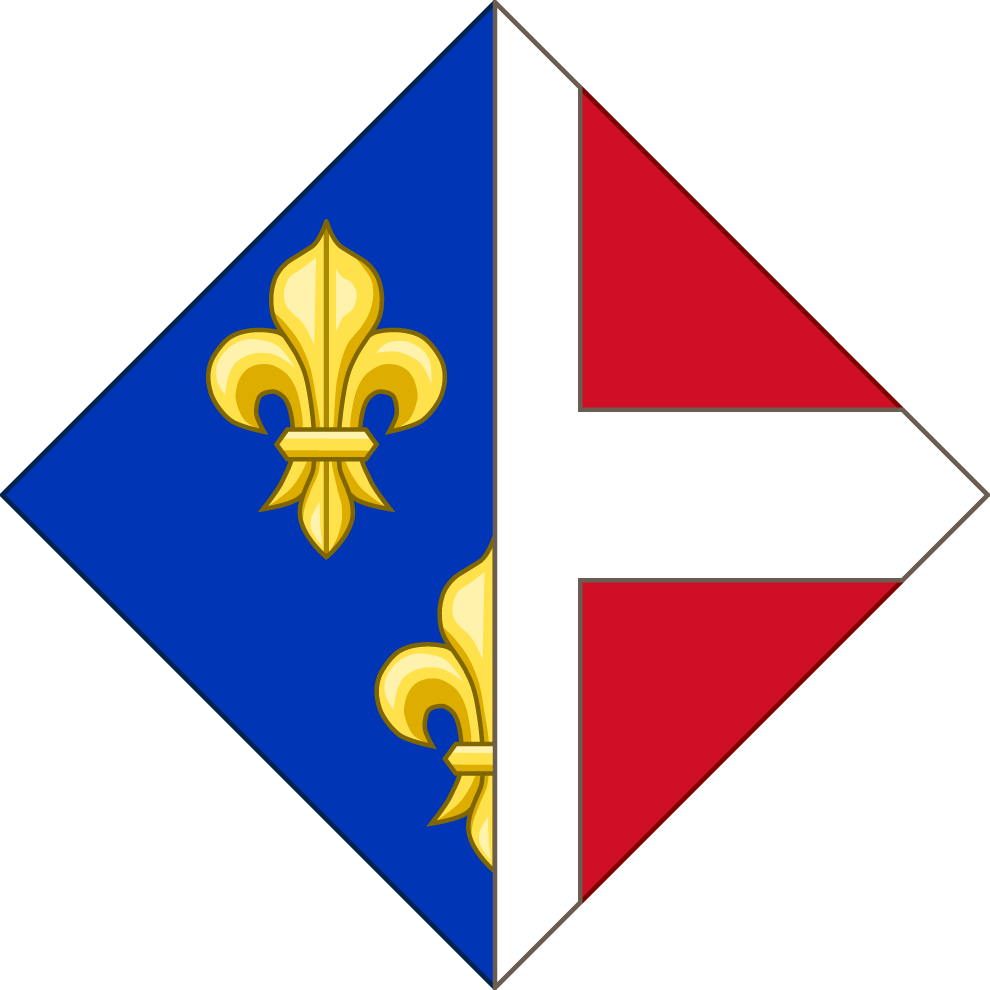
Arms of Charlotte as queen consort of France

On 22 July 1461, Charlotte became Queen of France. The following year, she became seriously ill and was close to death by August 1462. Although she recovered, her health was weakened.

Louis XI did not keep much of a representational court life. He had Queen Charlotte and her household kept secluded at the Château of Amboise, where she spent her days with her sisters and courtiers, supervising the education of her daughters (her son was educated by the king), playing chess and marbles, listening to her lute player, doing needlework and fulfilling her religious duties. On rare occasions, she was asked to fulfil ceremonial tasks as queen such as greeting foreign guests, for example in 1470, when the king took the powerful Earl of Warwick and the Duke of Clarence from England to Amboise to visit her. Charlotte was interested in literature and was praised for the taste and excellence of her personal library. She left a collection of about one hundred manuscripts, which would become the genesis of the Bibliothèque Nationale de France.

Charlotte was regarded as virtuous. A contemporary noted that "while she was an excellent Princess in other respects, she was not a person in whom a man could take any great delight"; However, after the birth of her last child in 1472, Louis swore that he would no longer be unfaithful, and according to the chronicler Phillip de Commynes, he kept this vow.

Charlotte served as regent in September 1465.

=== Queen dowager ===
Charlotte was widowed on 30 August 1483, upon which Louis XI was succeeded by their son Charles VIII, who was still a minor.

Louis XI did not make Charlotte regent if his son should succeed him while still a minor; he did in fact not formally appoint a regent at all, but he did leave instructions for a royal council to govern during such a minority, in which Charlotte, alongside Duke Jean de Bourbon II and their two sons-in-law Louis d'Orleans (married to their daughter Jeanne) and Peter II, Duke of Bourbon (married to their daughter Anne), were made members. In practice, her daughter Anne took control over France as regent during the minority of Charles.

Charlotte died on 1 December 1483 in Amboise, just a few months after her spouse's death. She is buried with him in the Basilica of Our Lady, Cléry in Cléry-Saint-André (Loiret) in the arrondissement of Orléans.

== Issue ==
Charlotte was the mother of eight children, of whom three, Charles VIII, who became king of France, Anne, who acted as regent of France for Charles, and Joan, who became queen of France as the spouse of Louis XII survived infancy.

- Louis (18 October 1458 – 1460)
- Joachim (15 July 1459 – 29 November 1459)
- Louise (born and died in 1460)
- Anne (3 April 1461 – 14 November 1522), married Peter II, Duke of Bourbon
- Joan (23 April 1464 – 4 February 1505), married Louis XII, King of France
- Louis (born and died on 4 December 1466)
- Charles VIII of France (30 June 1470 – 8 April 1498)
- Francis, Duke of Berry (3 September 1472 – November 1473)

== Sources ==
- Hand, Joni M. (2013). Women, Manuscripts and Identity in Northern Europe, 1350-1550. Ashgate. ISBN 9781409450238.
- Matarasso, Pauline. Queen's Mate: Three women of power in France on the eve of the Renaissance.
- Bridge, John Seargeant Cyprian. A History of France from the Death of Louis XI.
- Jansen, Sharon L. (2004). Chance, Jane (ed.). Anne of France: Lessons For My Daughter. D.S. Brewer. ISBN 1 84384 016 2.
- Kendall, Paul Murray (1971). The Universal Spider: Louis XI.
- Stieber, Joachim W. (1978). Pope Eugenius IV, the Council of Basel and the Secular and Ecclesiastical Authorities in the Empire. E.J. Brill. ISBN 90 04 05240 2.
- Vaughan, Richard (2010). Philip the Good: The Apogee of Burgundy. Vol. 3. The Boydell Press. ISBN 0 85115 917 6.

Charlotte of Savoy House of Savoy Born: 1441/3 Died: 1 December 1483
French royalty
Preceded by Marie of Anjou	Queen consort of France; 22 July 1461 – 30 August 1483	Vacant Title next held by Anne of Brittany
