= John Jacob of Montferrat =

Marquess of Montferrat (1395–1445)

John Jacob, Marquis of Montferrat

Marquis of Montferrat
- Reign: 1418–1445
- Predecessor: Theodore II Palaiologos
- Successor: John IV Palaiologos
- Born: 23 March 1395; Trino
- Died: 12 March 1445 (aged 49); Casale Monferrato
- Noble family: Palaeologus-Montferrat
- Spouse: Joanna of Savoy
- Issue: John IV, Marquis of Montferrat; Amadea; Isabella; William VIII, Marquis of Montferrat; Boniface III, Marquis of Montferrat; Teodoro Paleologo di Montferrato
- Father: Theodore II of Montferrat
- Mother: Joanna of Bar

John Jacob Palaeologus (Italian: Giovanni Giacomo Paleologo) (23 March 1395 – 12 March 1445) was the Margrave of Montferrat from 1418 to 1445.

He was born in Trino, Piedmont, the son of Theodore II of Montferrat, with whom he collaborated in the government of the marquisate from 1404. His mother was Johanna of Bar, daughter of Robert of Bar and Marie of France, Duchess of Bar. In 1412 he married Joanna of Savoy, sister of Duke Amadeus VIII.

After his father's death in 1418, John Jacob received the investiture as Marquis by emperor Sigismund. He distinguished himself for some brilliant military campaign in the Apennines area; he also increased his prestige through the marriage between his sister Sofia and the second last Byzantine Emperor, John VIII Palaiologos.

John Jacob's expansion, however, spurred the reaction of the Dukes of Savoy and of Filippo Maria Visconti of Milan. In 1431 they signed an alliance aiming at the cancellation of the Montferrat state. John Jacob was therefore compelled to ask support to France. In 1432 he was defeated anyway and sued for peace, ceding several territories to Savoy but retaining the seigniory over Montferrat, although with the status of Savoy vassal.

However, when Amadeus VIII asked him the payment of the war expenses, John Jacob rebelled; but, after having besieged in Chivasso, he was forced to cease. His state and his prestige were shattered, and he had again to declare himself vassal of Savoy.

John Jacob died at Casale Monferrato in 1445, being succeeded by his son John IV.

== Marriage and children ==
On 26 April 1411 John Jacob married Joanna of Savoy (1395–1460), daughter of Amadeus VII, Count of Savoy and Bonne of Berry. Their children were:

- John IV (1413–1464), Marquis of Montferrat 1445–1464.
- Amadea (1418–1440), married to John II de Poitiers-Lusignan, king of Cyprus.
- Isabella (ca. 1419–1475); married to Ludovico I del Vasto, Marquis of Saluzzo.
- William VIII (1422–1483), Marquis of Montferrat 1464–1483
- Boniface III (1424–1494), Marquis of Montferrat 1483–1494.
- Theodoro (1425–1481), cardinal.

== Sources ==
- Djurić, Ivan (2009). Il Crepuscolo Di Bisanzio: I tempi di Giovanni VIII Paleologo (in Italian). Donzelli Editore.
- de Ganay, Marianne Constrance (1913). Les bienheureuses dominicaines: (1190-1577); d'après des documents inédits (in French). Librairie academique Perrin et Cie.
- Soler, Abel (2017). L’Europa cavalleresca i la ficció literària: La cort napolitana d’Alfons el Magnanim: el context de Curial e Guelfa (in Spanish). Vol. III. Publicacions de la Universitat de Valencia.

== See also ==
- Wars in Lombardy

John Jacob of Montferrat Palaeologus-Montferrat Cadet branch of the Palaiologos dynasty Born: 23 March 1395 Died: 12 March 1445
Regnal titles
Preceded by Theodore II	Margrave of Montferrat; 1418–1445	Succeeded by John IV
