= Anne of Cyprus =

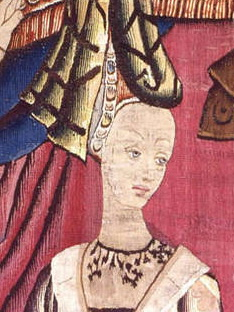
- Detail of a tapestry. An art historian has hypothetically suggested that it could depict either Mary of Cleves or Anne of Cyprus.

Duchess consort of Savoy
- Tenure: 1440–1462
- Born: 24 September 1418; Nicosia, Cyprus
- Died: 11 November 1462 (aged 44); Geneva
- Spouse: Louis, Duke of Savoy
- Issue more...: Amadeus IX, Duke of Savoy; Louis, King of Cyprus; Philip II, Duke of Savoy; Margaret, Margravine of Montferrat; Charlotte, Queen of France; Maria, Countess of Saint-Pol; Bona, Duchess of Milan; Jacques, Count of Romont
- House: Poitiers-Lusignan
- Father: Janus of Cyprus
- Mother: Charlotte of Bourbon

Anne of Cyprus (also known as Anne de Lusignan) (24 September 1418 – 11 November 1462) was a Duchess of Savoy by marriage to Louis, Duke of Savoy. She was the daughter of King Janus of Cyprus, and Charlotte of Bourbon; and a member of the Poitiers-Lusignan crusader dynasty.

Anne was highly influential in the Duchy of Savoy and served as a political advisor and the de facto ruler at the behest of her husband.

== Life ==
On 9 August 1431 a marriage contract was signed between 12-year-old Anne and Prince Amadeus of Piedmont, eldest surviving son and heir of Duke Amadeus VIII of Savoy; however, the prince died only twenty days later, on 29 August.

Five months later, on 1 January 1432, a second marriage contract was signed for 13-year-old Anne, this time with Louis of Savoy, Amadeus's younger brother and new heir of the Duchy of Savoy. The wedding took place two years later, on 12 February 1434. in Chambéry. A few months later, on 7 November, Duke Amadeus VIII resigned, leaving the government in the hands of his son Louis, although he officially abdicated in his favor only when he was elected as antipope, in 1440.

Anne's husband, who was more interested in poetry than his duchy, but very much in love with his wife, gradually left her to manage affairs of state. She, due to nostalgia for her own country, organized many receptions on behalf of the most powerful Cypriot lords. To impress the visitors, she decorated the castles, organized festivals, and offered gifts to the guests, the expense of which caused much protest from the peasants and nobles of the county of Vaud.

To relieve some of her debts, Anne organized a match for one of her daughters, which was an advantageous alliance for the house of Savoy. In 1451, at the age of ten, her daughter Charlotte married the dauphin of France, the future King Louis XI. He later would claim default of the promised dowry –new strongholds– and seized several castles in Bresse and several chief towns of Vaud.

In 1452, Anne bought the Shroud of Turin from Jeanne de Charny in exchange for the castle of Varambon. Years later Pope Paul II authorised Yolande of France to deposit the relic of the Holy Shroud in the vault of the castle of Chambéry from which she raised a tower above the sacristy, as a religious symbol.

== Death ==
Anne died on 11 November 1462 in Geneva, present-day Switzerland, at age 44.

== Issue ==
Louis and Anne had the following children:

1. Amadeus IX (Thonon-les-Bains, 1 February 1435 – 30 March 1472), Duke of Savoy.
2. Marie (Morges, 10 March 1436 – Thonon, 1 December 1437), died in childhood.
3. Louis (Geneva, 1 April 1437 – Ripaille, 12 July 1482), Count of Geneva, King of Cyprus.
4. Philip II (Thonon, 5 February 1438 – Torino, 7 November 1497), Duke of Savoy.
5. Marguerite (Pinerolo, April 1439 – Bruges, 9 March 1485), married firstly in December 1458 Giovanni IV Paleologo, Marquis of Montferrat, and secondly Pierre II de Luxembourg, Count of Saint-Pol, Brienne, Ligny, Marle, and Soissons.
6. Pierre (Geneva, c. 2 February 1440 – Torino, 21 October 1458), Archbishop of Tarentaise.
7. Janus (Geneva, 8 November 1440 – Annecy, 22 December 1491), Count of Faucigny and Geneva; married Hélène of Luxembourg, daughter of Louis de Luxembourg, Count of Saint-Pol and Jeanne de Bar, Countess of Marle and Soissons.
8. Charlotte (Chambéry, 16 November 1441 – Amboise, 1 December 1483), married King Louis XI of France.
9. Aimon (Geneva, 2 November 1442 – Geneva, 30 March 1443), died in childhood.
10. Jacques (Geneva, 29 November 1444 – Geneva, 1 June 1445), died in childhood.
11. Agnes (Chambéry, October 1445 – Paris, 16 March 1509), married François d'Orléans, Count of Dunois. Their son was Louis I d'Orléans, Duke of Longueville.
12. Jean Louis (Geneva, 26 February 1447 – Torino, 4 July 1482), Bishop of Geneva.
13. Maria (Pinerolo, 20 March 1448 – 13 September 1475), married Louis de Luxembourg, Count of Saint-Pol, Constable of France.
14. Bonne (Avigliana, 12 August 1449 – Fossano, 17 November 1503), married Galeazzo Maria Sforza, Duke of Milan.
15. Jacques (Giacomo) (Geneva, 12 November 1450 – Ham, Picardy, 30 January 1486), Count of Romont, Lord of Vaud.
16. Anne (Geneva, September 1452 – Geneva, 1 October 1452), died in childhood.
17. François (Annecy, 19 August 1454 – Torino, 6 October 1490), Archbishop of Auch and Bishop of Geneva.
18. Jeanne (died at birth, c. 1455).
19. François (1456 – 1458), died in childhood.

== Sources ==
- Anderson, Michael Alan (2014). St Anne in Renaissance Music: Devotion and Politics. Cambridge University Press.
- Hand, Joni M. (2013). Women, Manuscripts and Identity in Northern Europe, 1350-1550. Routledge.
- Planchart, Alejandro Enrique (2018). "The Last Years (1458–1474)". Guillaume Du Fay: The Life and Works. Vol. 1. Cambridge University Press. ISBN 978-1107166042.
- Rohr, Zita Eva (2016). Yolande of Aragon (1381-1442) Family and Power: The Reverse of the Tapestry. Palgrave Macmillan.
- Scott, John Beldon (2003). Architecture for the Shroud: Relic and Ritual in Turin. University of Chicago Press.
- Spencer, Eleanor P.; Stechow, Wolfgang (1966). "Sts. Nereus and Achilleus in the Fifteenth Century". The Art Bulletin. 48, No. 2 (Jun): 207–209.
