= Jacques of Savoy, Count of Romont =

Savoyard nobleman and military commander

Jacques of Savoy Count of Romont
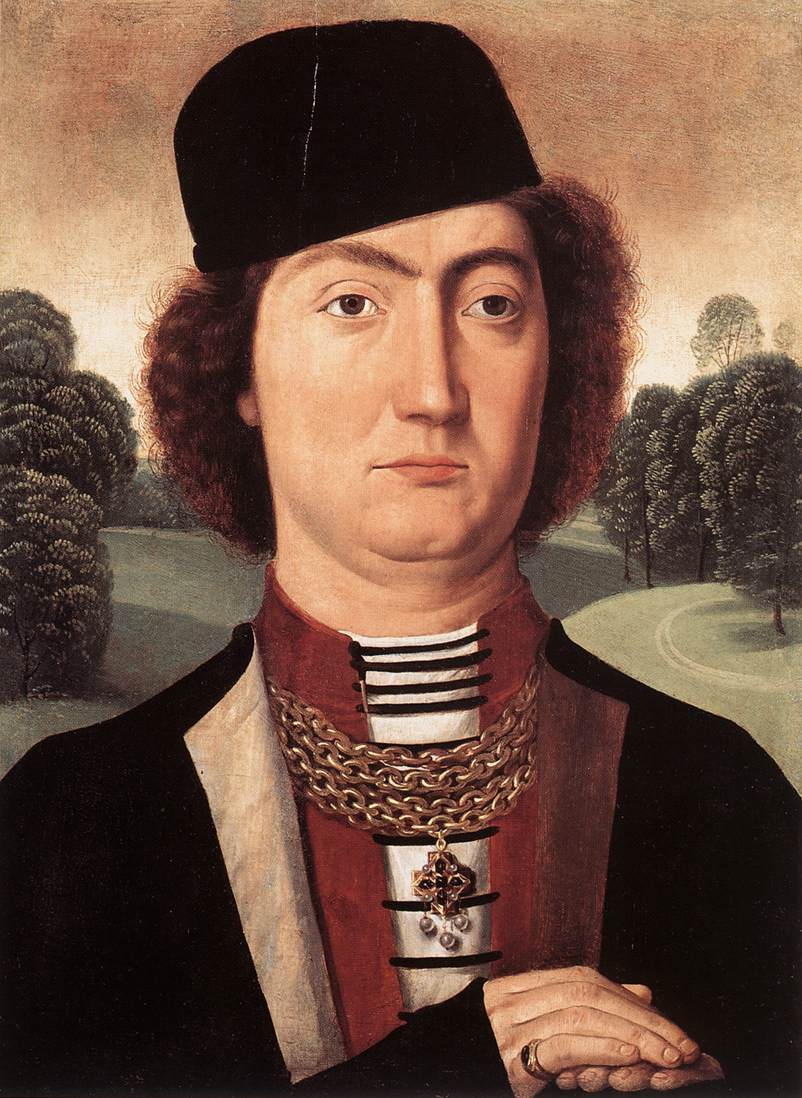
- Portrait by Hans Memling, 1470s
- Born: 12 November 1450; Geneva, Duchy of Savoy
- Died: 30 January 1486 (aged 35); Château de Ham, Ham, Burgundian Low Countries
- Noble family: House of Savoy
- Spouse: Marie I, Countess of Saint-Pol and Soissons

Jacques of Savoy, Count of Romont (12 November 1450 – 30 January 1486) was a member of the House of Savoy and military commander during the Burgundian Wars.

== Early life ==
Coat of Arms of Jacques of Savoy

Jacques was the seventh son of Louis, Duke of Savoy and Anne of Cyprus. In 1460, his father gave him as an appanage the region of Vaud, under the title of Count of Romont. The House of Savoy possessed the Lordship of Vaud since the 12th century, when it wrested control from the original owners, the House of Zähringen. Savoy extended its influence by supporting the city of Bern against the House of Habsburg. After the Battle of Laupen, Savoy and Bern became allies.

In 1468, Jacques became a guest at the court of Charles the Bold, Duke of Burgundy, and was appointed to important military commands in the Burgundian army. As his brother Amadeus IX, Duke of Savoy suffered from epilepsy, his wife, Yolande of Valois, and his brother, the Count of Bresse govern for him. Taking advantage of the weakness of the Savoyard ducal power Amadeus IX, in 1471 Jacques elevated his appanage into a quasi-principality, headed by a governor. Jacques took the opportunity of a conflict with his sister-in-law Yolande to grab several fortified places that Amadeus IX had retained, and an arbitration by Bern and Fribourg in 1471 awarded them to him. However, these different alliances and clever political manoeuvering by King Louis XI eventually led to the loss of all the territories belonging to the Count of Romont in Vaud.

== In the army of Charles the Bold ==
Jacques of Savoy became a close friend of Charles the Bold. In 1473, he became Governor of Burgundy, Grand Marshal and supreme commander of a third of the Burgundian army. Jacques had made the city of Bern—at that time on friendly terms with the House of Savoy—protector of his territories in Vaud during his absence. However, Bern joined the confederacy of the original 8 cantons, becoming an ally of King Louis XI through the League of Constance, which further comprised Sigismund of Tirol, the town of Basel and the Alsatian towns of Strasbourg, Colmar, and Sélestat. The treaty stipulated mutual assistance in case of outside attack and was directed against the Duke of Burgundy.

Sigismund of Austria, of the House of Habsburg, had given the Upper Alsace to Burgundy as an appanage. The region revolted against its Burgundian bailiff, Peter von Hagenbach, and the League of Constance declared war on Charles the Bold and laid siege to Héricourt, starting the Burgundian Wars. In November 1474 Jacques of Savoy led his army in an attempt to lift the siege. However, when he arrived, Héricourt had already surrendered and in the ensuing battle the Burgundian army suffered a crushing defeat.

== The looting of Vaud ==
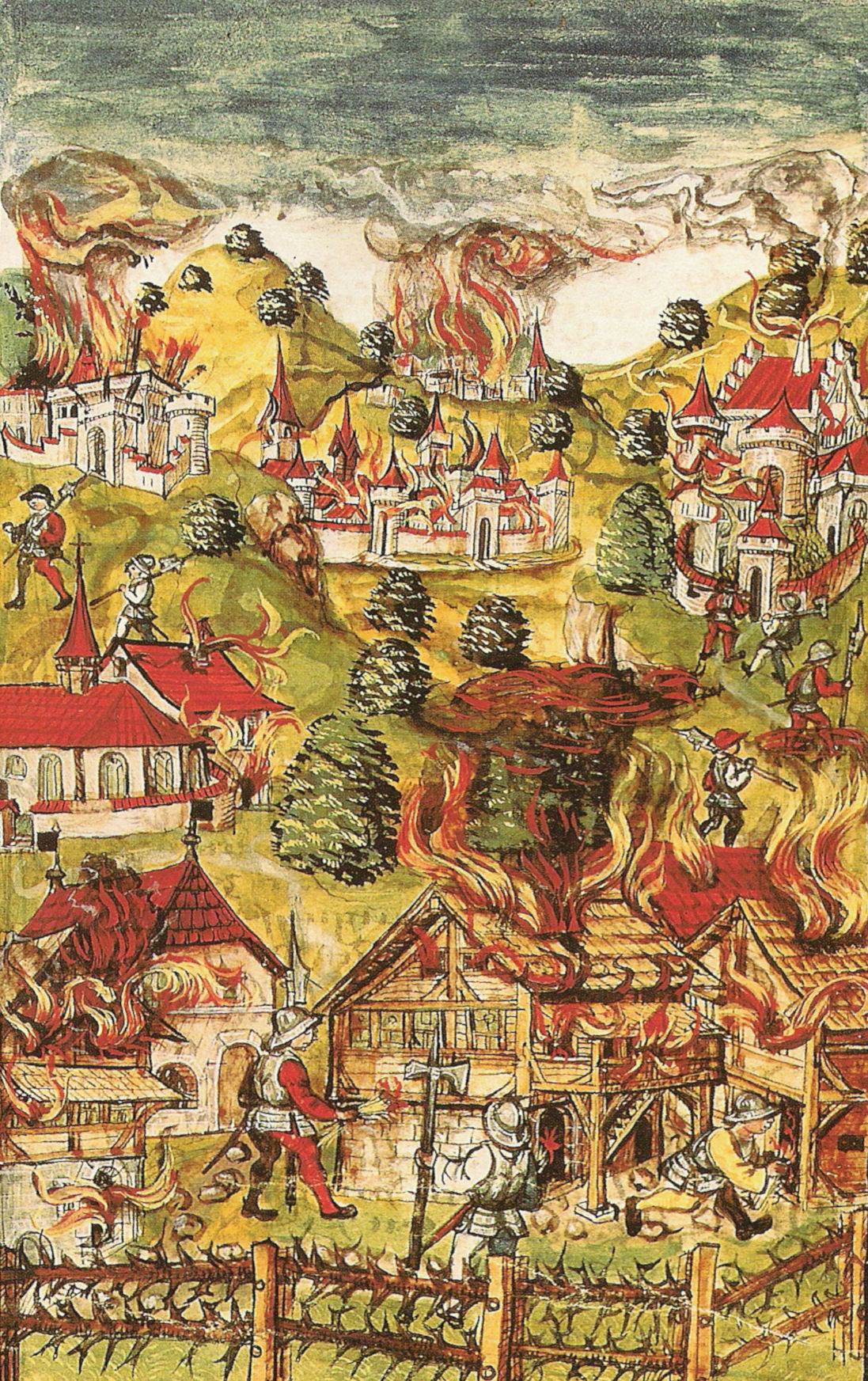
Depiction of the looting of Vaud in the Luzerner Schilling

Winter put an end to the military campaign in the Haute-Alsace, but in April 1475 the Swiss Confederacy, led by Bern, raised militia groups against Vaud. Vaud is strategically located, offering access to the Alps and transit to the Mediterranean and Italy. Bern also wanted to stop the flow of Italian mercenaries using Vaud to join the army of Charles the Bold. The armed groups ravaged the land, killing, raping, plundering and ransoming. As Jacques de Savoy could not return to defend his territories, the "Swiss bands" had soon overrun them, taking Grandson, Orbe, Montagny and Echallens. Murten took the side of the invaders. Massacres took place in Nyon, Clées and Jougne. La Sarraz and Cossonay were taken. Genève and Lausanne, bishop's cities, were heavily ransomed. In the East, troops from Bern took Aigle and a part of Chablais. In the end, the surviving population of 16 towns and 43 castles swore allegiance to their new Swiss masters.

On 14 October 1475 Bern declared war on Jacques of Savoy on the pretext of the hostility of the population they had themselves terrorised. Troops from Bern invaded Vaud again and massacred resisting garrisons. As no help would be forthcoming, other Vaudois villages surrendered before being attacked. However, as Charles the Bold became successful on the European battlefields, Jacques of Savoy could at last concentrate his attention on his territories in Vaud. In the beginning of 1476 he was able to retake his territories, in part because the Swiss were withdrawing everywhere before the powerful army of Charles the Bold arrived.

== Loss of Vaud ==
After the battles of Grandson and Murten, both decisive Swiss victories, Vaud was again conquered by the Swiss and lost to Jacques of Savoy. Bern demanded Vaud and threatened Geneva and Savoy. Meanwhile, Duchess Yolande had fallen into the hands of Charles the Bold. King Louis XI intervened in favor of his sister and forced the Swiss to accept an armistice. On 14 April 1476 the Swiss Confederacy and Savoy concluded a peace treaty under the sponsorship of the French King.

The Treaty of Fribourg stipulated that the Swiss would be paid to return the territories of Savoy. However, the House of Savoy was unable to raise the ransom, so the territories remained in the hands of Bern. The Treaty also prevented the "Barony of Vaud" from being separated from Savoy in appanage and excluded the Count of Romont forever as Lord of Vaud. In this way, Jacques of Savoy lost all rights to his fiefs.

== New fiefs and death ==
After the loss of his possessions in Vaud and the death of Charles the Bold before the walls of Nancy, Jacques of Savoy joined the court of Charles's daughter and heiress, Mary of Burgundy, wife of the Habsburg emperor Maximillian I. In 1478, he was awarded the Order of the Golden Fleece. He participated courageously in the Battle of Guinegate in 1479, where he was wounded, helping to beat the army of King Louis XI of France and keeping the County of Flanders for Mary.

In 1484 Jacques of Savoy married Marie de Luxembourg (1462–1546), his niece and the granddaughter of Louis of Luxembourg-Saint-Pol, Count of Saint-Pol. They had one child, Françoise Louise of Savoy (1485–1511). She married Henry III of Nassau-Breda but died without issue.

Jacques received Saint-Pol from King Charles VIII of France, with other fiefs in Flanders and Brabant out of the inheritance of Louis of Luxembourg.

Jacques of Savoy died on 30 June 1486 in the Château de Ham, an old possession of the Counts of Saint-Pol.

== Ancestry ==
Ancestors of Jacques of Savoy, Count of Romont

8. Amadeus VII, Count of Savoy
4. Amadeus VIII, Duke of Savoy
9. Bonne of Berry
2. Louis, Duke of Savoy
10. Philip the Bold
5. Mary of Burgundy
11. Margaret III, Countess of Flanders
1. Jacques of Savoy, Count of Romont'
12. James I of Cyprus
6. Janus of Cyprus
13. Helvis of Brunswick-Grubenhagen
3. Anne of Cyprus
14. John I, Count of La Marche
7. Charlotte of Bourbon-La Marche
15. Catherine of Vendôme

== Bibliography ==
- Bauchau, B., "Jacques de Savoie (1450–1486) : histoire d'un portrait et portrait historique.", à l'occasion du 500^{e} anniversaire de la réunion du 15^{e} chapitre de l'Ordre de la Toison d'Or à Malines en 1491. Actes du colloque international "L'Ordre de la Toison d'Or à Malines en 1491", pages 117–147, Malines, 7 septembre 1991, publ. mai 1992.
- Verdeil, Auguste, "Histoire du Canton de Vaud", Martignier et Compe., Lausanne 1849–1852, Chapitre IX
