= Pierre de Craon =

French nobleman (c. 1345–c. 1409)

The Blazon of Pierre de Craon le Grand

Pierre de Craon (c. 1345 – c. 1409), known as "le Grand", was a medieval French aristocrat notorious for his riotous temperament, culminating in his attempted murder of Olivier V de Clisson, Constable of France. Events following the assault led to the mental breakdown of King Charles VI of France and ushered in a long period of political instability in France.

== Early life ==
Craon inherited considerable wealth from his father, Guillaume I de Craon. He held the titles Lord of La Ferté-Bernard and Sablé.

Craon was entrusted with money to finance the expedition of Louis I, Duke of Anjou to seize the Kingdom of Naples, but he kept the funds himself and spent his time in debauchery in Venice. He was blamed for Louis' premature death and the collapse of the expedition. On his return to Paris, he was publicly upbraided by Louis' brother, John, Duke of Berry. However, his wealth protected him.

== Attack on Clisson ==
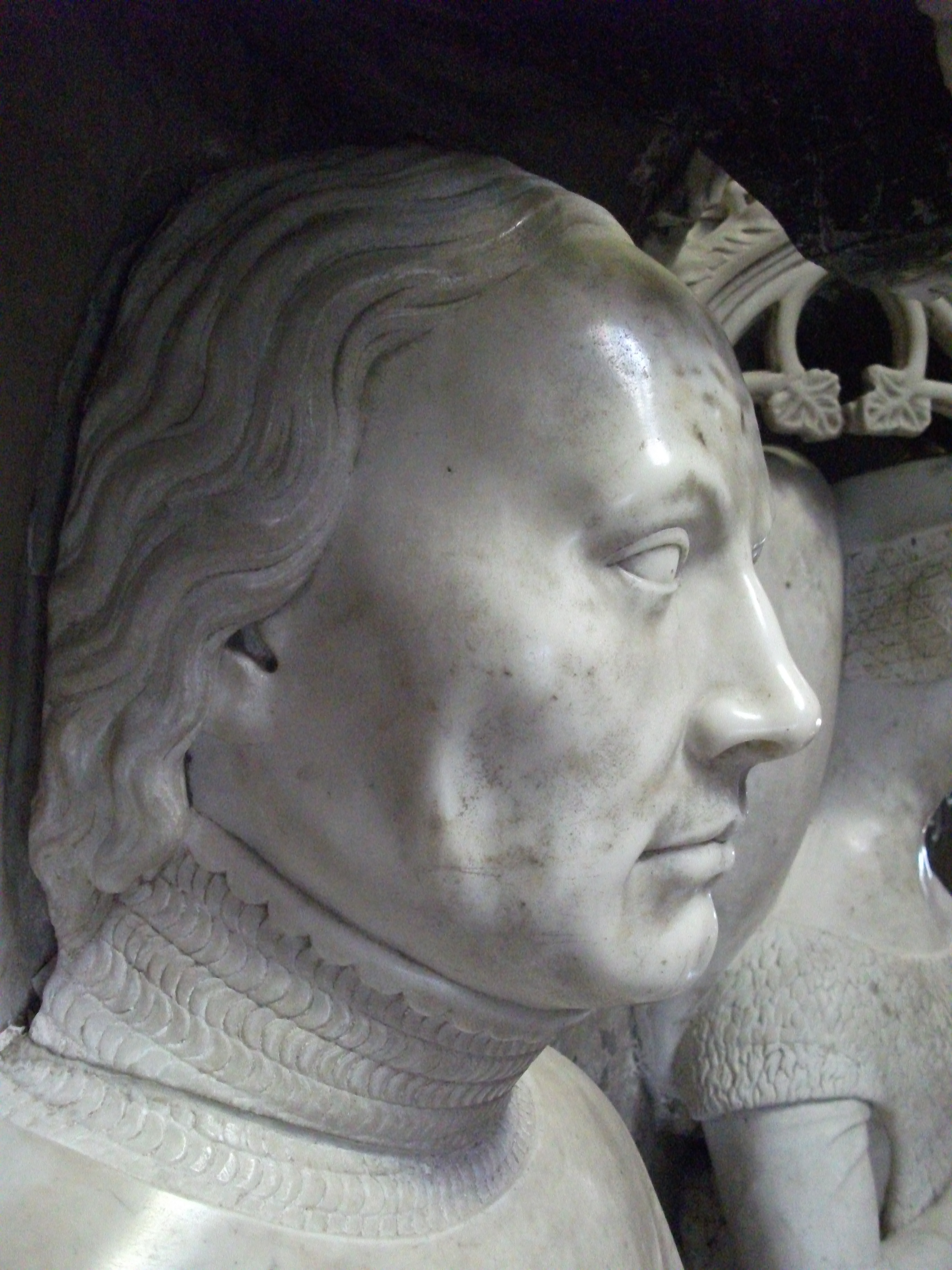
Olivier V de Clisson as depicted on his tomb, Basilique Notre Dame du Roncier, Josselin, Brittany, France

In 1391, Craon was abruptly expelled from the royal court in Paris for unknown reasons. He blamed Olivier V de Clisson, encouraged by de Clisson's enemy John IV, Duke of Brittany. After a period in Brittany, Craon returned to Paris in secret, planning to murder Clisson. He waylaid Clisson in a narrow street. Clisson's unarmed servants fled, but Clisson was saved from death by his chainmail coat, and was able to draw his sword and fend off his attackers. In the struggle, he fell from his horse and was knocked unconscious against the door of a baker's shop. Believing him dead, Craon fled Paris for Brittany.

In fact Clisson was only superficially injured. In the aftermath of the attack, several of Craon's servants in Paris were arrested and executed for assisting him. Craon's property was seized and his castle in Porchefontaine near Versailles was razed to the ground. John V refused to deliver Craon to the king, so Charles and Clisson marched on Brittany, only for the king to have a mental breakdown during the expedition, killing several of his own soldiers in a deranged fit. Clisson's enemies at court blamed him for provoking the disaster and instituted proceedings against him. Clisson himself then fled to Brittany, becoming a lifelong ally of his old enemy John IV.

== Exile and return ==
Craon was forced to move from place to place, at last seeking refuge with Richard II of England, who granted him a pension. When the threat of prosecution for the attack on Clisson was lifted, Craon returned to France; however, his enemies instituted legal measures to recover the money that Craon had misappropriated from Louis I, Duke of Anjou. Craon was imprisoned in the Louvre, but was soon released following interventions by the Queen of England and the Duchess of Burgundy. A deal was made over the money and Craon made penance for his crimes. In an unprecedented move, he was made confessor to some monks who had been convicted of bewitching the king. He erected a cross bearing his coat of arms at the gallows of Paris, at which criminals could confess before their execution. He also donated money to the Conventual Franciscans, dedicating them to acts of mercy.

The date of Craon's death is not known. His son Antoine de Craon was implicated in the murder of Louis I, Duke of Orléans and was killed at the Battle of Agincourt in 1415.
