= Louis, Duke of Savoy =

Duke of Savoy from 1440 to 1465

Louis I
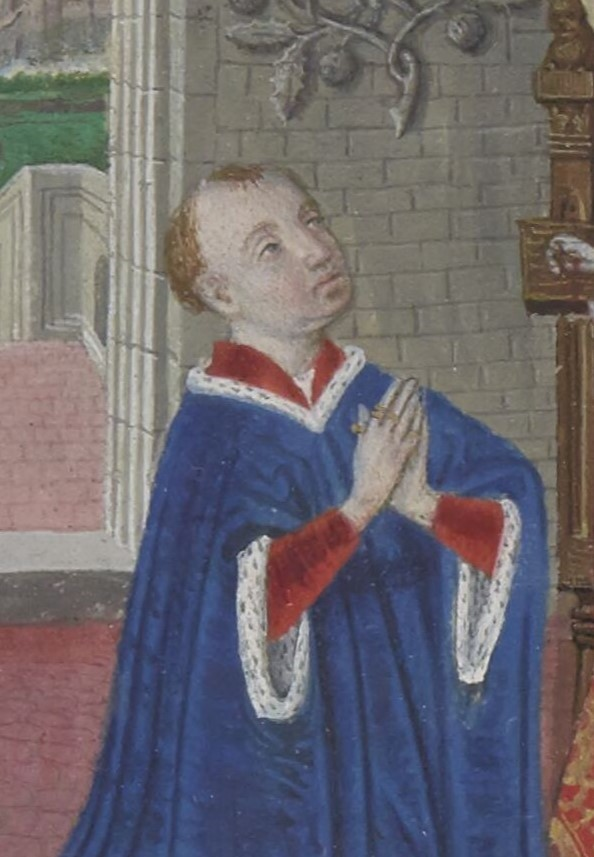
- Louis in an Illuminated miniature from the Hours of Louis of Savoy, 1445–1460

Duke of Savoy
- Reign: 6 January 1440 – 29 January 1465
- Predecessor: Amadeus VIII
- Successor: Amadeus IX
- Born: 24 February 1413; Geneva
- Died: 29 January 1465 (aged 51); Lyon
- Spouse: Anne of Cyprus
- Issue: Amadeus IX, Duke of Savoy; Louis, King of Cyprus; Philip II, Duke of Savoy; Marguerite, Countess of Saint-Pol; Charlotte, Queen of France; Maria, Countess of Saint-Pol; Bona, Duchess of Milan; Jacques, Count of Romont
- House: Savoy
- Father: Amadeus VIII
- Mother: Mary of Burgundy

Louis I (Italian: Lodovico; 24 February 1413 – 29 January 1465) was Duke of Savoy from 1440 until his death in 1465.

== Life ==
Louis was born in Geneva, the son of Amadeus VIII, Duke of Savoy and Mary of Burgundy. He was the first to hold the title of Prince of Piedmont.

On 1 November 1433 (or 12 February 1434), at Chambéry, he married Princess Anne of Cyprus, an heiress of the Kingdom of Cyprus and the defunct Kingdom of Jerusalem.

The family resided at Allaman Castle, in the region of Vaud (present-day Switzerland). As Count of Vaud, Louis attempted to conquer the Duchy of Milan, then ruled by the short-lived Ambrosian Republic, but the campaign was unsuccessful.

In 1452, Louis received the Shroud of Turin from Margaret de Charny. The relic remained in the possession of the House of Savoy until 1946, when the Kingdom of Italy came to an end. It was later bequeathed to the Holy See in 1983.

Louis died in Lyon in 1465 while returning from a visit to France.

== Issue ==
Louis and Anne had:

1. Amadeus IX (Thonon-les-Bains, 1 February 1435 – 30 March 1472), Duke of Savoy.
2. Marie (Morges, 10 March 1436 – Thonon, 1 December 1437), died in childhood.
3. Louis (Geneva, 1 April 1437 – Ripaille, 12 July 1482), Count of Geneva, King of Cyprus.
4. Philip II (Thonon, 5 February 1438 – Torino, 7 November 1497), Duke of Savoy.
5. Marguerite (Pinerolo, April 1439 – Bruges, 9 March 1485), married firstly in December 1458 Giovanni IV Paleologo, Marquis of Montferrat, and secondly Pierre II de Luxembourg, Count of Saint-Pol, Brienne, Ligny, Marle, and Soissons.
6. Pierre (Geneva, c. 2 February 1440 – Torino, 21 October 1458), Archbishop of Tarentaise.
7. Janus (Geneva, 8 November 1440 – Annecy, 22 December 1491), Count of Faucigny and Geneva; married Hélène of Luxembourg, daughter of Louis de Luxembourg, Count of Saint-Pol and Jeanne de Bar, Countess of Marle and Soissons.
8. Charlotte (Chambéry, 16 November 1441 – Amboise, 1 December 1483), married King Louis XI of France.
9. Aimon (Geneva, 2 November 1442 – Geneva, 30 March 1443), died in childhood.
10. Jacques (Geneva, 29 November 1444 – Geneva, 1 June 1445), died in childhood.
11. Agnes (Chambéry, October 1445 – Paris, 16 March 1509), married François d'Orléans, Count of Dunois. Their son was Louis I d'Orléans, Duke of Longueville.
12. Jean Louis (Geneva, 26 February 1447 – Torino, 4 July 1482), Bishop of Geneva.
13. Maria (Pinerolo, 20 March 1448 – 13 September 1475), married Louis de Luxembourg, Count of Saint-Pol, Constable of France.
14. Bonne (Avigliana, 12 August 1449 – Fossano, 17 November 1503), married Galeazzo Maria Sforza, Duke of Milan.
15. Jacques (Giacomo) (Geneva, 12 November 1450 – Ham, Picardy, 30 January 1486), Count of Romont, Lord of Vaud.
16. Anne (Geneva, September 1452 – Geneva, 1 October 1452), died in childhood.
17. François (Annecy, 19 August 1454 – Torino, 6 October 1490), Archbishop of Auch and Bishop of Geneva.
18. Jeanne (died at birth, c. 1455).
19. François (1456 – 1458), died in childhood.

== Sources ==
- Fletcher, Stella (2000). The Longman Companion to Renaissance Europe, 1390–1530. Pearson Education Limited.
- Grendler, Paul F. (2017). The Jesuits and Italian Universities, 1548–1773. The Catholic University of America Press.
- Hand, Joni M. (2013). Women, Manuscripts and Identity in Northern Europe, 1350-1550. Routledge.
- Vaughan, Richard (1975). Valois Burgundy. Penguin Books Ltd.
- Ward, A.W.; Prothero, G.W.; Leathes, Stanley, eds. (1911). The Cambridge Modern History. Vol. XIII. The Macmillan Company.

Louis, Duke of Savoy House of Savoy Born: 24 February 1413 Died: 29 January 1465
Regnal titles
Preceded by Amadeus VIII	Duke of Savoy; 1440–1465	Succeeded by Amadeus IX
