= List of painted churches in Cyprus =

There are over sixty churches in Cyprus with Byzantine and post-Byzantine wall paintings. Of these, ten that are situated in the Troodos Mountains have been inscribed jointly on the UNESCO World Heritage List as the Painted Churches in the Troodos Region.

== History ==
The origins of Christianity on the island may be traced to the visit of St. Paul, St. Barnabas and St. Mark around AD 46. After the fall of the western Roman Empire, Cyprus came under the sway of Byzantium, although the timely discovery of Barnabas' relics helped the Church of Cyprus uphold its autocephaly. The crusader Kingdom of Cyprus outlived the Fall of Constantinople by a generation; the subsequent sale of the island to Venice led to a brief period of Italo-Byzantine painting. In 1571 Cyprus fell to the Ottomans and the practice of ecclesiastic wall painting largely came to an end.

== Organization of space ==
Subject to the layout of each church, the iconographic schema typically accords with the classic Byzantine tripartition, evident also in Byzantine mosaic decoration, the three zones comprising: (1) the dome and conch of the apse; (2) the pendentives, squinches and upper vaults; and (3) the lower, secondary vaults and walls. The first is reserved for depictions of the holiest persons, the Christ Pantokrator and the Virgin; the second for scenes from the Life of Christ and the festival cycle; and the third for the choir of intercessory saints.

== Preservation ==
Since the Turkish invasion of Cyprus in 1974, a number of churches in the north have been looted and their wall paintings detached to supply the international antiquities trade. Among them is the Church of St. Evphemianos in Lysi: the thirteenth-century Christ Pantocrator mural and surrounding angels were detached, leaving their feet behind; the paintings were then acquired for the Menil Collection and displayed at the Byzantine Fresco Chapel in Houston, Texas before their repatriation to the south in 2012. Meanwhile, many churches in the south been the subject of conservation interventions, conducted by the Department of Antiquities, Dumbarton Oaks and the Courtauld Institute of Art, aimed at reconciling the competing demands of stability, legibility and authenticity within the framework of ongoing devotional practice.

== Churches ==
Church	Municipality	Exterior	Comments	Interior	Coordinates	Ref.
Panagia Kanakaria; Παναγία Κανακαριά; Our Lady Kanakaria	Lythrangomi		sixth-century wall mosaics were looted in the 1970s; some have been recovered from art dealers		35°28′42″N 34°09′58″E	
Panagia Angeloktisti; Παναγία η Αγγελόκτιστη; Virgin Mary Built by the Angels	Kiti				34°50′51″N 33°34′14″E	
Panagia Kyra; Παναγιά Κυρά; Most Holy Lady	Livadia				35°23′53″N 34°01′30″E	
Agios Nikolaos tis Stegis; Άγιος Νικόλαος της Στέγης; St. Nicholas of the Roof	Kakopetria		included in UNESCO inscription		34°58′38″N 32°53′22″E	
Panagia Theotokos; Παναγία Θεοτόκος; Most Holy Mother of God	Kakopetria				34°59′13″N 32°54′04″E	
Agios Georgios Perachoritis; Άγιος Γεώργιος ο Περαχωρίτης; St. George Perachoritis	Kakopetria				34°59′13″N 32°54′04″E	
Agios Sozomenos; Άγιος Σωζόμενος; St. Sozomenos	Galata				34°59′49″N 32°53′53″E	
Panagia Theotokos; Παναγία Θεοτόκος / Αρχάγγελος Μιχαήλ; Most Holy Mother of God or Archangel Michael	Galata				34°59′49″N 32°53′53″E	
Panagia Podithou; Παναγία Ποδίθου; Our Lady of Podithou	Galata		included in UNESCO inscription		34°59′49″N 32°53′53″E	
Agia Paraskevi; Αγία Παρασκευή; St. Paraskevi	Galata				34°59′49″N 32°53′53″E	
Agioi Ioachim kai Anna; Αγίοι Ιωακείμ και Άννα; Saints Joachim and Anna	Kaliana				35°00′45″N 32°53′03″E	
Archangelos Michael; Αρχάγγελος Μιχαήλ; Archangel Michael	Vyzakia				35°04′37″N 33°00′50″E	
Panagia Phorbiotissa; Παναγία Φορβιώτισσα / Παναγία της Ασίνου; Virgin Mary Phorbiotissa or Our Lady of Asinou	Nikitari		included in UNESCO inscription		35°02′47″N 32°58′24″E	
Panagia Chrysokourdaliotissa; Παναγία Χρυσοκουρδαλιωτισσα; Virgin Mary Chrysokourdaliotissa	Spilia		also known as the Church of the Dormition, Kourdali; submitted in 2002 as an extension to the UNESCO inscription and currently on the Tentative List; the timber roof is a reconstruction of the 1960s		34°58′27″N 32°57′02″E	
Timios Stavros; Τίμιος Σταυρός; Holy Cross	Agia Eirini				34°58′52″N 32°58′08″E	
Panagia tou Arakos; Παναγία του Άρακος; Our Lady of Arakos	Lagoudera		included in UNESCO inscription close examination during conservation and restoration work has indicated the use of the fresco technique for the 1192 paintings, with plaster joins revealing the giornate		34°57′55″N 33°00′25″E	
Stavros tou Agiasmati; Σταυρός του Αγιασμάτι; Holy Cross of Agiasmati	Platanistasa		included in UNESCO inscription		34°56′46″N 33°02′38″E	
Timios Stavros; Τίμιος Σταυρός; Holy Cross	Kyperounta				34°56′21″N 32°58′34″E	
Timios Stavros; Τίμιος Σταυρός; Holy Cross	Pelendri		included in UNESCO inscription		34°53′46″N 32°58′01″E	
Panagia Katholiki; Παναγία Καθολική; Virgin Mary the Catholic	Pelendri				34°53′46″N 32°58′01″E	
Timios Stavros; Τίμιος Σταυρός; Holy Cross	Kouka				34°51′00″N 32°53′10″E	
Agia Mavra; Αγία Μαύρα; St. Mavra	Koilani				34°50′38″N 32°51′36″E	
Agios Georgios; Άγιος Γεώργιος; St. George	Monagri				34°48′31″N 32°54′35″E	
Archangelos Michael; Αρχάγγελος Μιχαήλ; Archangelos Michael	Monagri				34°50′38″N 32°51′36″E	
Panagia Amasgou; Παναγία της Αμασγούς; Our Lady Amasgou	Monagri				34°48′34″N 32°54′36″E	
Agios Mamas; Άγιος Μάμας; St. Mamas	Louvaras				34°50′10″N 33°02′17″E	
Tou Soteros; Μεταμόρφωση του Σωτήρος; Transfiguration of the Saviour	Palaichori Oreinis		included in UNESCO inscription		34°55′23″N 33°05′38″E	
Panagia Chrysopantanassa; Παναγία η Χρυσοπαντάνασσα; Virgin Mary Chrysopantanassa	Palaichori Oreinis				34°55′20″N 33°05′34″E	
Timios Prodomos; Τιμιος Προδρομος; St. John the Precursor	Askas				34°55′44″N 33°04′41″E	
Agia Christina; Αγία Χριστίνα; St. Christina	Askas				34°56′28″N 33°04′29″E	
Agios Ioannis Lampadistis; Άγιος Ιωάννης ο Λαμπαδιστής; St. John Lampadistis	Kalopanagiotis		included in UNESCO inscription		34°59′32″N 32°49′49″E	
Agioi Andronikos kai Athanasia; Αγίoi Ανδρόνικοs και Αθανασία; Saints Andronicus and Athanasia	Kalopanagiotis				34°59′31″N 32°49′41″E	
Panagia tou Moutoulla; Παναγία του Μουτουλλά; Our Lady of Moutoullas	Moutoullas		included in UNESCO inscription		34°59′02″N 32°49′30″E	
Archangelos Michael; Αρχάγγελος Μιχαήλ; Archangel Michael	Pedoulas		included in UNESCO inscription		34°58′01″N 32°49′44″E	
Timios Stavros; Τιμιος Σταυρος; Holy Cross	Palaiomylos				34°56′06″N 32°49′23″E	
Panagia Kardiovastouza; Παναγία η Kαρδιοβαστάζουσα; Virgin Mary who Holds the Heart	Kaminaria				34°55′41″N 32°47′02″E	
Agios Vasilios; Άγιος Βασίλειος; St. Basil	Kaminaria				34°55′41″N 32°47′02″E	
Katakomba Agia Solomoni; Κατακόμβη Αγίας Σολομωνής; Catacomb of St. Solomoni	Paphos				34°45′42″N 32°24′45″E	
Enkleistra kai Monasteri tou Agiou Neophytou; Εγκλείστρα και Μοναστήρι του Αγίου Νεοφύτου; Enkleistra and Monastery of Agios Neophytos	Tala		see Neophytos of Cyprus		34°50′47″N 32°26′47″E	
Agia Paraskevi; Αγία Παρασκευή; St. Paraskevi	Yeroskipou				34°45′34″N 32°27′11″E	
Panagia Katholiki; Παναγία Καθολική; Virgin Mary the Catholic	Kouklia				34°42′26″N 32°34′30″E	
Palaia Enkleistra; Παλαιά Εγκλείστρα; Palaea Enkleistra	Kouklia				34°41′53″N 32°35′35″E	
Agios Nikolaos; Άγιος Νικόλαος; St. Nicholas	Galataria				34°52′37″N 32°37′55″E	
Agios Theodosios; Άγιος Θεοδόσιος; St. Theodosius	Akhelia				34°44′17″N 32°29′10″E	
Panagia Chryseleousa; Παναγία Χρυσελεούσα; Virgin Mary Chryseleousa	Emba				34°48′00″N 32°25′01″E	
Agios Kirykos; Άγιος Κήρυκος; St. Kirykos	Letymvou				34°51′18″N 32°30′47″E	
Archangelos Michael; Αρχάγγελος Μιχαήλ; Archangel Michael	Kholi				34°58′44″N 32°26′42″E	
Agioi Apostoloi; Άγιοι Απόστολοι; Holy Apostles	Pera Chorio				35°00′47″N 33°23′35″E	
Agios Demetrianos; Άγιος Δημητριανός; St. Demetrianus	Dali				35°00′47″N 33°23′35″E	
Agia Aikaterini; Αγία Αικατερίνη; St. Catherine	Pyrga				34°55′35″N 33°25′49″E	
Agia Marina; Αγία Μαρίνα; St. Marina	Pyrga				34°55′29″N 33°25′55″E	
Agios Antonios; Άγιος Αντώνιος; St. Anthony	Kellia				34°58′30″N 33°37′19″E	
Agios Georgios; Άγιος Γεώργιος; St. George	Xylofagou				34°58′37″N 33°51′00″E	
Agios Georgios tis Arperas; Άγιος Γεώργιος της Άρπερας; St. George of Arpera	Tersefanou				34°51′14″N 33°32′46″E	
Archangelos Michael; Αρχάγγελος Μιχαήλ; Archangel Michael	Kato Lefkara				34°51′43″N 33°18′54″E	
Agia Mavra; Αγία Μαύρα; St. Mavra	Kyrenia				35°20′20″N 33°19′16″E	
Khrysokava; Χρυσοκάβα; Khrysokava	Kyrenia				35°20′20″N 33°19′16″E	
Agios Ioannis Chrysostomos; Άγιος Ιωάννης Χρυσόστομος; St. John Chrysostom	Koutsovendis		the wall paintings in the chapel of the Holy Trinity, dating to c. 1100, were documented and conserved by a team from Dumbarton Oaks under Cyril Mango in the 1960s; they have been whitewashed and covered in large sheets of paper since 1974		35°16′27″N 33°25′06″E	
Panagia Aphendrika; Παναγία Αφέντρικα; Our Lady of Aphendrika	Rizokarpaso				35°16′26″N 33°25′05″E	
Antiphonitis; Χριστός Αντιφωνητής; Christ Antiphonitis	Kalograia		some of the paintings, including most of the Tree of Jesse, were detached in the 1970s and have been found in the hands of private collectors		35°19′38″N 33°37′08″E	
Panagia Theotokos; Παναγία Θεοτόκος; Most Holy Mother of God	Trikomo				35°17′02″N 33°53′24″E	
Agios Evphemianos; Άγιος Ευφημιανός; St. Euphemianos	Lysi		the detached thirteenth-century Pantrokrator was acquired for the Menil Collection and displayed at the Byzantine Fresco Chapel in Houston, Texas before its repatriation in 2012		35°05′09″N 33°39′53″E	
Agios Ioannis Evangelistis; Άγιος Ιωάννης ο Ευαγγελιστής; Cathedral of St. John the Evangelist	Nicosia				35°10′24″N 33°22′04″E	
Agios Sozomenos; Άγιος Σωζόμενος; St. Sozomenos	Potamia				35°02′31″N 33°26′42″E	
Agios Andronikos; Αγίos Ανδρόνικοs; St. Andronicus	Polis Chrysochous				35°02′20″N 32°25′26″E	
Agioi Barnabas kai Ilarion; Αγίοι Βαρνάβας και Ιλαρίων; Saints Barnabas and Hilarion	Peristerona				35°07′48″N 33°04′55″E	
Panagia Pergaminiotissa; Παναγία Περγαμηνιώτισσα; Our Lady Pergaminiotissa	Akanthou				35°23′02″N 33°45′50″E	
Agios Photios; Άγιος Φώτιος; St. Photius	Yialousa				35°32′06″N 34°11′17″E	
Agia Solomoni; Αγία Σολομωνή; St. Solomoni	Koma tou Yialou				35°25′23″N 34°07′30″E	
Agios Nikolaos; Άγιος Νικόλαος; St. Nicholas	Koma tou Yialou				35°25′23″N 34°07′30″E	
Agia Mavri; Αγία Μαύρή; St. Mavra	Rizokarpaso				35°37′05″N 34°24′29″E	
Agios Philon; Άγιος Φίλων; St. Philon	Rizokarpaso				35°37′44″N 34°26′28″E	
Agios Prokopios; Άγιος Προκόπιος; St. Procopius	Sygkrasi				35°17′06″N 33°51′25″E	
Panagia Avgasida; Παναγία Αυγασίδα; St. Augasida	Aloa				35°12′43″N 33°49′44″E	
Panagia Apsinthiotissa; Παναγία Αψινθιώτισσα; Our Lady Apsinthiotissa	Sichari		some of the Byzantine wall paintings have been detached since 1974 and have since appeared on the antiquities market		35°17′00″N 33°23′22″E	
Agios Georgios ton Hellenon; Άγιος Γεώργιος των Ελλήνων; St. George of the Greeks	Famagusta				35°07′26″N 33°56′37″E	
Panagia Chrysogialiotissa; Παναγία Χρυσογιαλιώτισσα; The Golden Virgin of Gialia	Gialia				35°05′22″N 32°33′18″E	
Agios Georgios Exorinos; Άγιος Γεώργιος ο Εξορινός; St. George the Exiler	Famagusta				35°07′32″N 33°56′16″E	

== See also ==
- Byzantine art
- Dionysius of Fourna
- Orthodox church architecture
- Painted Churches in the Troödos Region
- Hague Convention for the Protection of Cultural Property in the Event of Armed Conflict
