= Painted Churches in the Troodos Region =

UNESCO World Heritage Site
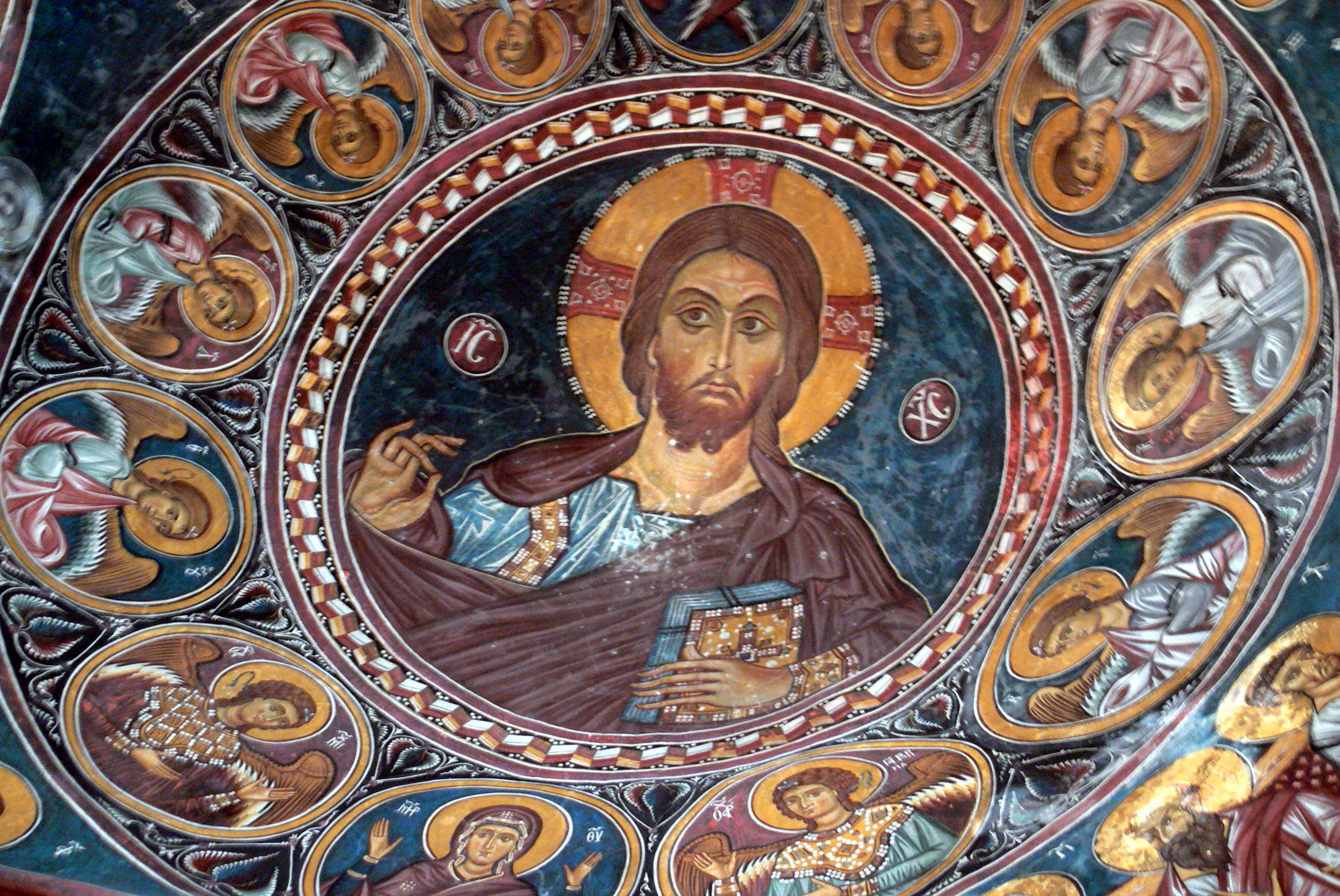
- Asinou, Panagia Phorbiotissa church: fresco of Christ Pantocrator (narthex).

- Location within Cyprus Location within West and Central Asia Location within Mediterranean
- Location: Troodos Mountains, Cyprus
- Criteria: Cultural: (ii), (iii), (iv)
- Reference: 351bis
- Inscription: 1985 (9th Session)
- Extensions: 2001
- Area: 3.693 ha (9.13 acres)
- Coordinates: 34°55′13″N 33°5′45″E

The Painted Churches in the Troödos Region (Greek: Τοιχογραφημένοι ναοί στην περιοχή του όρους Τρόοδος, romanized: Toichografiménoi naoí stin periochí tou órous Tróodos) is a UNESCO World Heritage Site in the Troödos Mountains of central Cyprus. The complex comprises ten Byzantine churches and monasteries richly decorated with Byzantine and post-Byzantine murals:

1. Church of Agios Nikolaos (St. Nicholas) tis Stegis in Kakopetria: An 11th-century monastery and the oldest surviving katholikon in Cyprus
2. Agios Ioannis (St. John) Lampadistis Monastery in Kalopanagiotis: A 13th-century monastery
3. Church of Panagia (The Virgin) Phorviotissa (Asinou) in Nikitari: A 12th-century church
4. Church of Panagia (The Virgin) tou Arakou in Lagoudhera: A 12th century church
5. Church of Panagia (The Virgin) in Moutoullas: A 13th-century chapel and the earliest example of steep-pitched wooden roofs
6. Church of Archangelos Michael (Archangel Michael) in Pedoulas: A late 15th-century church
7. Church of Timios Stavros (Holy Cross) in Pelendri: A church containing unique 14th-century wall paintings
8. Church of Panagia (The Virgin) Podithou in Galata: An early-16th century church
9. Church of Stavros (Holy Cross) Agiasmati in Platanistasa: A 14th-century church
10. Church of Agia Sotira (of the Transfiguration of the Savior) tou Soteros in Palaichori Oreinis: A 16th-century church.

Initially nine of these churches were designated by UNESCO in 1985 with the church in Palaichori added to the list in 2001. The Church of Panagia Chrysokourdaliotissa in Kourdali, Spilia, was submitted as a potential further extension in 2002 and currently resides on the Tentative List.

== Description ==
In 965 AD, Cyprus was annexed by the Byzantine Empire in the Arab-Byzantine wars. Over a period of 500 years until the 16th century, many Byzantine churches were constructed in the Troödos Region. In fact, this regions holds one of the greatest concentrations of monasteries and churches in the former Byzantine Empire. The World Heritage Site includes a variety of churches, ranging from small chapels to grand monasteries. These site demonstrate the range of architectural and artistic influences affecting Cyprus over the entire Byzantine reign. However, all sites display some architectural elements that are unique to Cyprus, including steep-pitched wooden roofs with tiling.

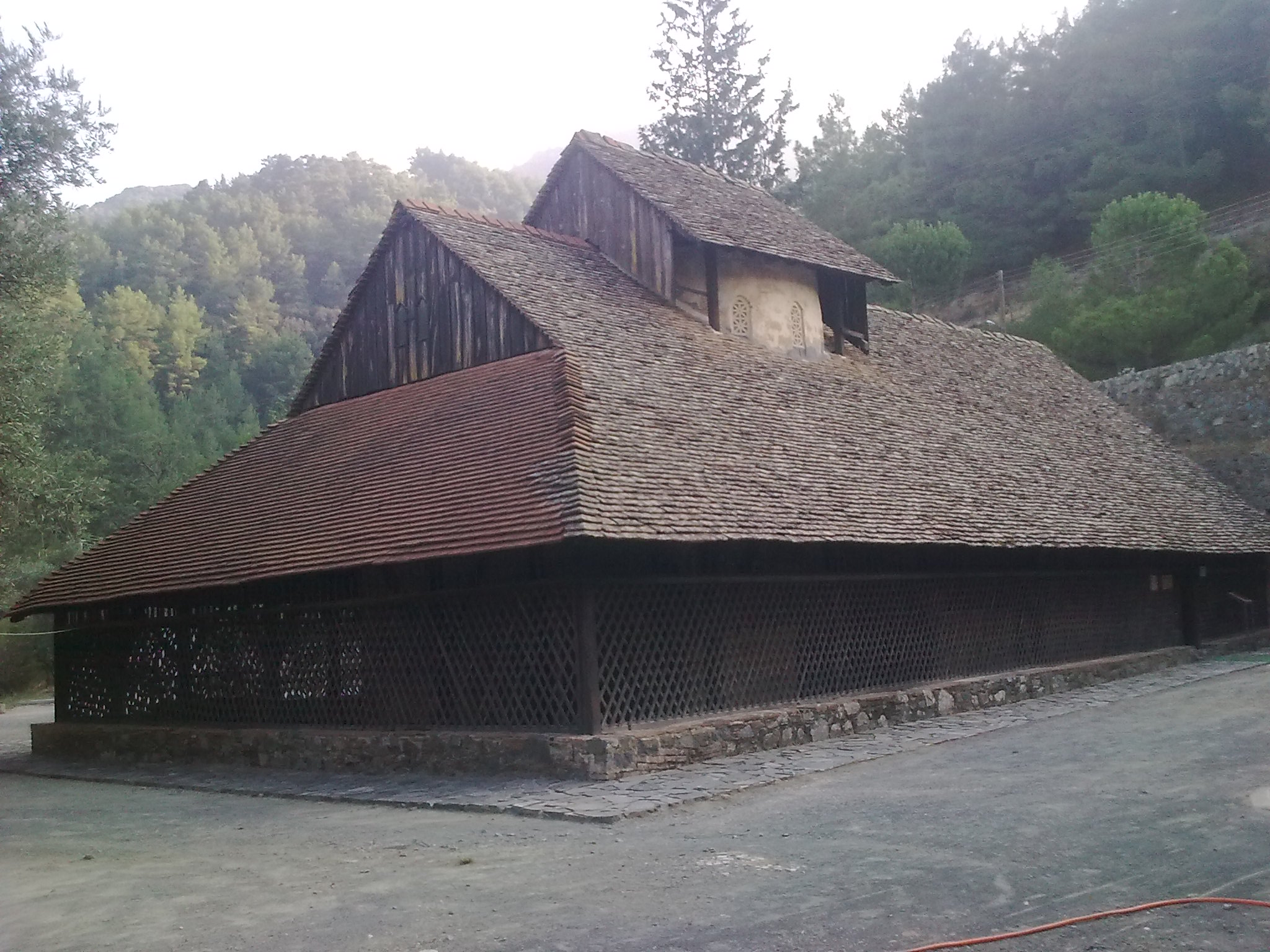
Panagia Tou Araka, showing the steep-sided wooden roofs of many of the smaller churches

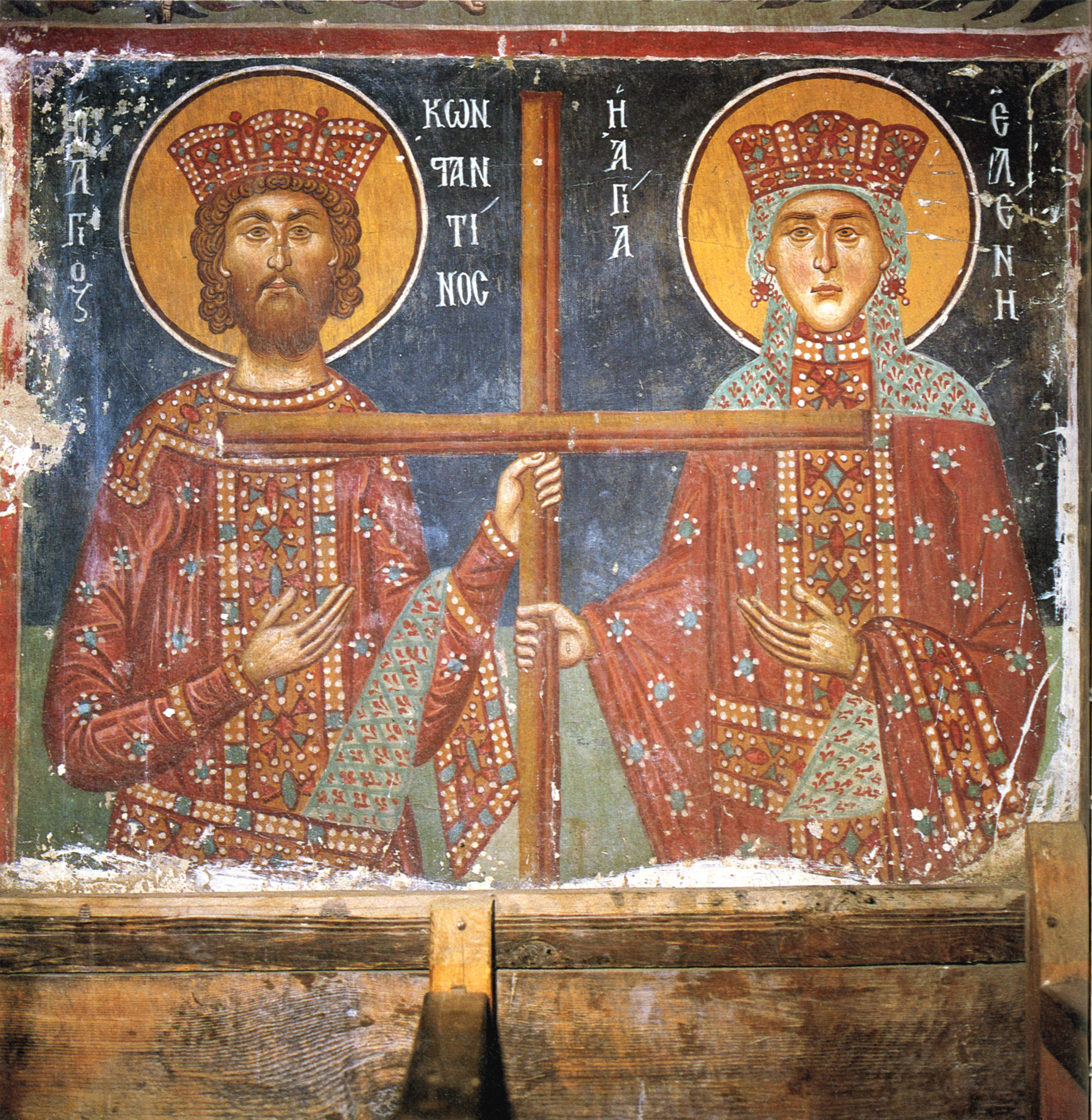
Constantine and Helen, Church of Archangel Michael, Pedoulas

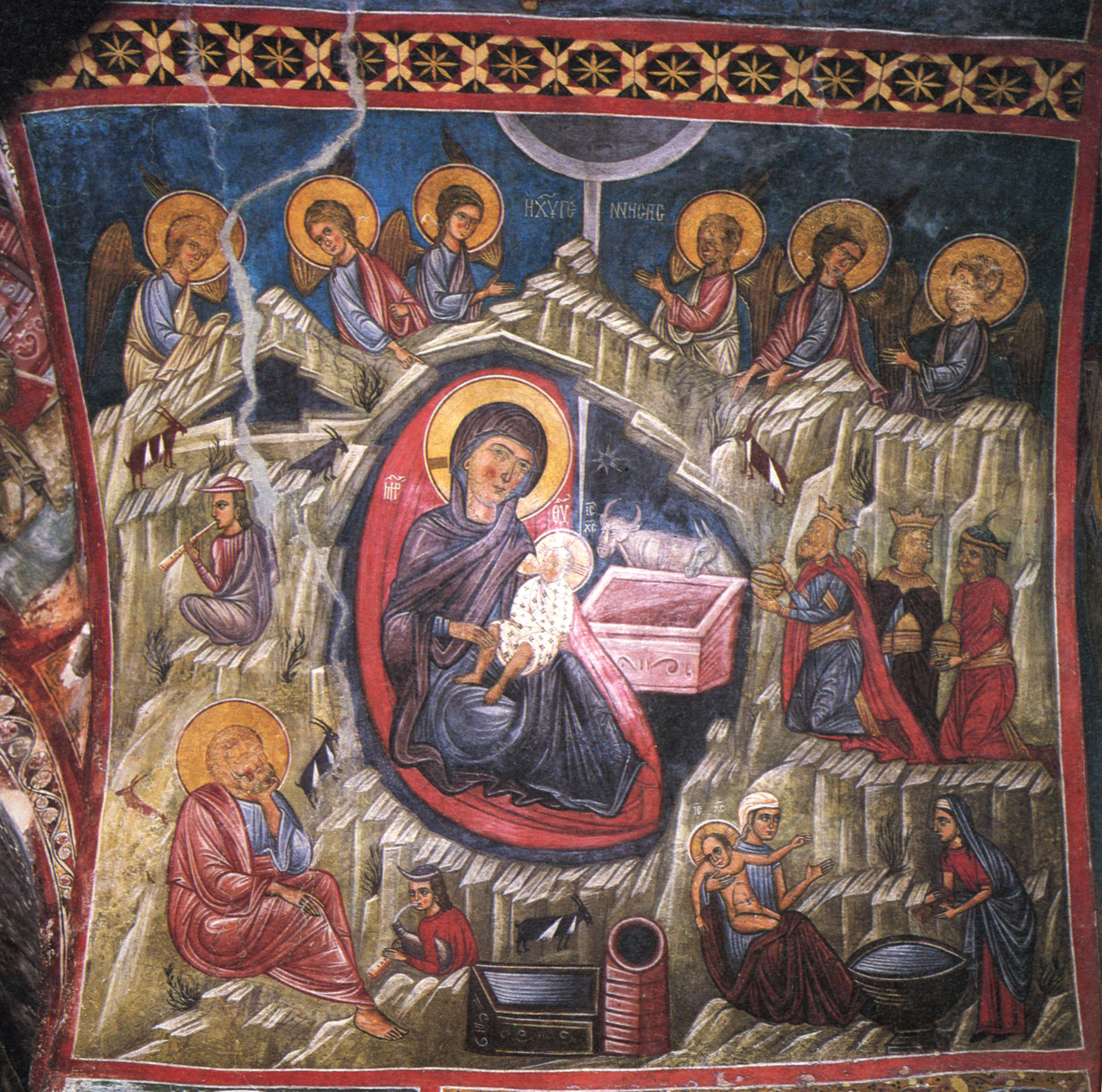
Birth of Christ in Agios Nikolaos Tis Stegis

== See also ==
- List of painted churches in Cyprus
