= Stavrovouni Monastery =

Cypriot monastery

Stavrovouni
- Σταυροβούνι
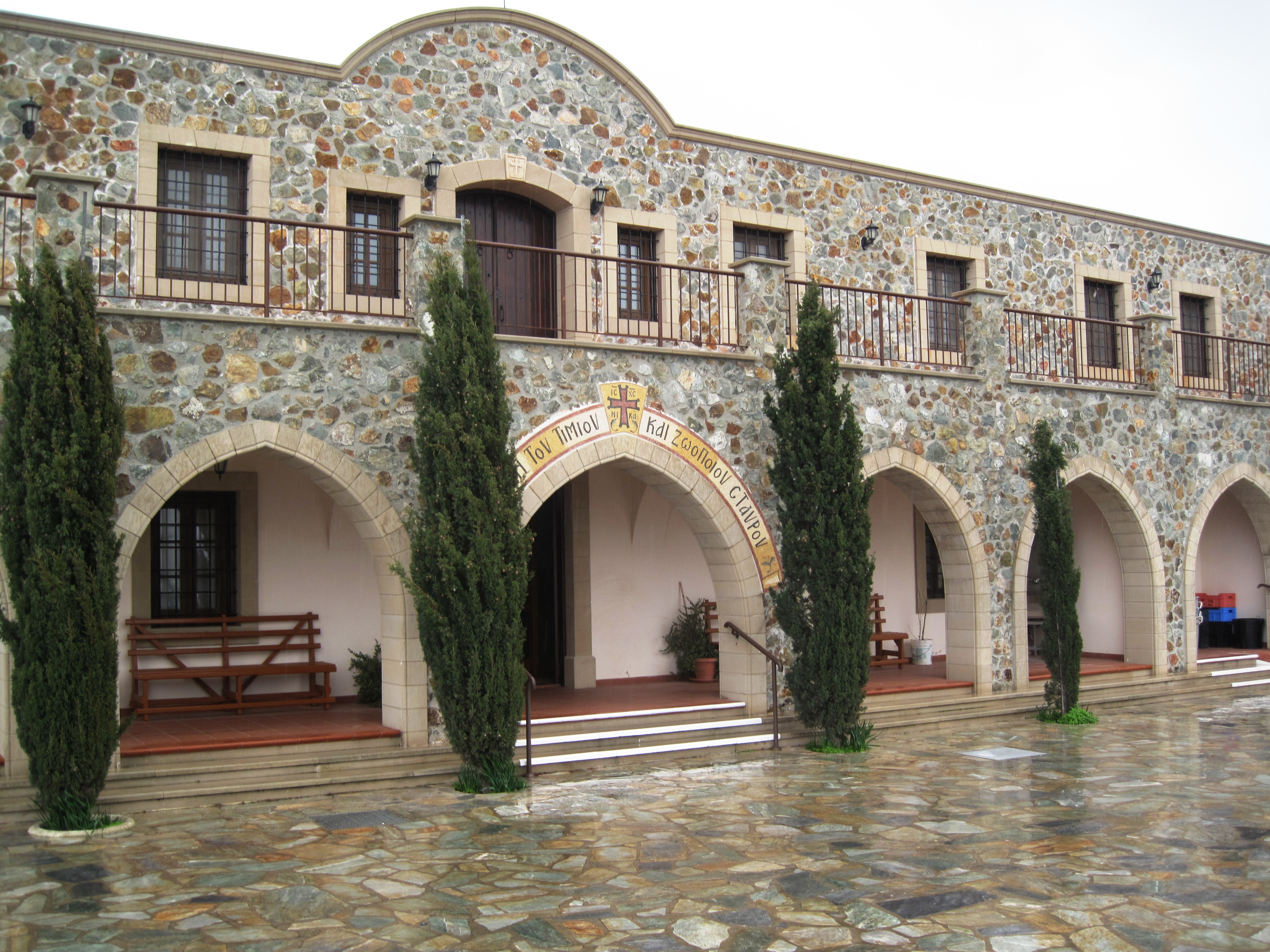
- Monastery entrance

- Location within Cyprus
- Interactive map of Stavrovouni

Monastery information
- Full name: Holy Monastery of Stavrovouni
- Other names: Monastery of the Precious and Life-giving Cross
- Order: Orthodox monasticism
- Established: AD 327–329
- Dedication: Holy Cross
- Diocese: Church of Cyprus

People
- Founders: Saint Helena, Saint Constantine
- Prior: Archimandrite Elder Dionysios C'

Architecture
- Style: Byzantine

Site
- Location: near Pyrga, Larnaca District
- Country: Cyprus
- Coordinates: 34.885875°N 33.435499°E
- Visible remains: Church, Holy Cross
- Public access: Men only

Stavrovouni Monastery (Greek: Ιερά Μονή Σταυροβουνίου) is a Greek Orthodox monastery which stands on the top of a hill called Stavrovouni (Greek: Σταυροβούνι) in Cyprus; it is sometimes simply known as Stavrovouni. The monastery is one of the few places where one can see a piece of the True Cross. Stavrovouni Monastery was founded by Saint Helena and Saint Constantine c. AD 327–329.

== Location ==
The monastery is located on the peak of the mountain of the same name (Stavrovouni) in the District of Larnaca. The mountain in earlier times had been known under the name of Olympus, but nowadays the highest point of the Troodos Mountains further to the west bears that name. Stavrovouni, as the name already indicates, is dedicated to the True Cross; it can be derived from two words 'stavros' (Greek: Σταυρός) for cross and 'vouno' (βουνό) for mountain, so that it basically means "the mountain of the Cross".

== Establishment ==
According to religious tradition, the monastery was founded by St. Helena and the Roman Emperor Constantine the Great. According to the 15th-century Cypriot chronicler Leontios Makhairas, after the end of the First Ecumenical Council of Nicaea (325), Helena went on a pilgrimage to the Holy Land where she discovered the three crosses on which Jesus and the two thieves had been crucified. She had them excavated and wanted to bring them to Constantinople, but she is said to have left one of these crosses in Cyprus during an involuntary visit caused by shipwreck. Religious history says that the True Cross was transferred by a miracle to the peak of a high hill overnight and that a strong light was coming out of that peak. After several unsuccessful attempts to get the True Cross out of that mountain, Helena decided to leave a piece there, and built a small chapel to house it.

Stavrovouni is therefore considered to be one of the oldest monasteries in the world; other ancient monasteries include Saint Athanasius (344), Saint Anthony (356), Saint Macarius (360), Saint Gabriel (Mor Gabriel) (397), Saint Euthymius (460), Saint Sabbas (Mar Saba) (483) and Saint Catherine, Sinai (565).

== Relics ==
The most significant relic that Stavrovouni Monastery possesses is a piece of the True Cross, left at the monastery by Saint Helena. There are references which report that the True Cross used to stand in the air unsupported. Today, the remaining piece of the Cross is kept within a large, silver, cross-shaped reliquary. Other relics left at the monastery by Helena include the Cross of the Good Thief, one of the Holy Nails, and what is believed to be part of the rope that had bound Jesus to the Cross.

In addition, visitors will find two small chains which were worn by Saint Panaretos, Bishop of Paphos, during his life, and which were in direct contact with his body.

== History ==
Stavrovouni is the earliest documented monastery on the island. The oldest written reference dates from the Byzantine period, and it proves that Stavrovouni had been an important religious centre since the 4th century. The relevant information can be found in the memoirs of a Rus' traveler, Abbot Daniel, who stayed on Cyprus in 1106. He recorded that the True Cross was located on Mount Olympus with the objective of "warding off evil spirits and curing any illness", and he noted, "This cross is like a meteorite, it is not supported in the ground, because the Holy Ghost holds it in the empty space. I, unworthy man, knelt down before this holy, mysterious object and have seen with my own, sinful eyes the inherent holy grace present in this place."

After its foundation, Stavrovouni was occupied by Orthodox monks living according to the rule of St. Basil. We obtain further historical information from Western visitors to Cyprus in the 13th century. Willibrandi de Oldenburg, for example, visited Stavrovouni in 1211 and wrote, "The cross of the Good Thief is on the highest mountain in Cyprus" – which was incorrect, as Stavrovouni is not as high as the Troodos peak. Ludolph von Suchen noted in 1305, "The mountain is like the Mount Tabor on which the Benedictine monks live. From its peak one can see the Lebanon." This is true, but the weather must be very clear in order to verify this.

In its long history, Stavrovouni went through times of great poverty and hardship caused by the numerous invasions by foreigners on the island. Nowadays, the True Cross is no longer there and nobody knows what has happened to it. In 1598, the Bohemian nobleman Krystof Harant noted, "Nobody knows what the Turks have done with the True Cross." The walls, the church, the iconostasis, and the monks' cells in Stavrovouni were almost completely destroyed during a great fire in 1888. The only relic which has been preserved down to the present is a silver cross in which a minute piece of the True Cross is inserted, the only major reliquary which is still kept in Stavrovouni.

=== Recent history ===
The records suggest that the monastery had no monks for a period roughly between the 16th and the 19th century, a time when the Turks ruled the island. The monastery was abandoned from 1571; however, some hermits continued to live there. This fact was mentioned by Russian monk and pilgrim, Vasil Grigorovich-Barsky in the first half of the 18th century. At the end of the 19th century, Elder Dionysios I moved to Stavrovouni from Mount Athos in 1889, and the monastery was in operation again. In 1890, three more Cypriot monks, again from Mount Athos, joined him at Stavrovouni: Fathers Varnavas – who would become the next Abbot – and his two brothers Kallinikos and Gregorios.

Following that, new monks entered the monastery, which grew larger and larger and soon became the spiritual center of the island of Cyprus. The monastery grew so much during the mid-20th century that it was in a position where it was able to send monks to other ruined monasteries to help their growth. For example, monks from Stavrovouni moved to the Monastery of Panagia Trooditissa in Troodos and created a new group. Other monks attempted to move to, and revive, the Monastery of Saint John the Baptist in Mesa Potamos in Limassol.

=== Most recent Abbots ===
Elder Dionysios I served as the first Abbot until 1902, and then Elder Varnavas took over. The most recent Abbots are:

- Elder Dionysios I – 1889–1902
- Elder Varnavas – 1902–1948
- Elder Dionysios II – 1948–1952
- Elder Germanos – 1952–1982
- Elder Athanasios – 1982–2021
- Elder Dionysios III – 2021–present

=== Known monks ===
Stavrouvouni Monastery has been a center of spirituality and worship in Cyprus over the last century, as many spiritual monks made their homes there. Saint Filoumenos the Cypriot martyr, member of the Brotherhood of the Holy Sepulchre, is one such important monk who started his monastic life at Stavrovouni. On the 16/29 November 1979, he died violently as a martyr at Jacob's Well, where he served as Superior. His twin brother Archimandrite Elpidios started his monastic life at Stavrovouni, as well.

The Hieromonk Kyprianos († 1955) is another significant figure who lived at Stavrovouni; he was known for his strict way of life and his helpful advice to the people of Cyprus. Archbishop Leontios of Cyprus (1896–1947) was staying at Stavrovouni for some period and was closely related with Hieromonk Kyprianos.

== Today ==
Recently, the monastery underwent a complete renovation. Its small church was restored again with frescoes and icons by the well-known painter, Fr. Kallinikos, a monk from Stavrovouni. The legend of the foundation is recorded in these pictures: St. Helena in a brilliant red garment and the Finding of the True Cross in Jerusalem. (As an aside, the emperor's mother recognised that she had the True Cross by the miraculous healing of a woman). Colourful, but also not without the skull painted beneath Christ's Cross for centuries is the Deposition. The majority of the frescoes in the church refer to the Cross and the life of St. Helena. In this manner, Stavrovouni is continuing the deeply rooted Byzantine painting tradition.

=== Ministries ===
Stavrovouni has a long tradition in icon painting and frescoes, and its most famous icon painter monk is Father Kallinikos. Even the first Abbot Dionysios I was an icon painter, and there are several pieces of work by monks from Stavrovouni on the island. Apart from icon painting, the monks work in a number of other ministries, such as agriculture and the production of aromatics for the church. Moreover, locals visit the monastery, especially on feast days, and follow the monks in their worship programme – in liturgy, vespers, etc.

=== Metochia ===
Metochia or Dependencies (Greek: Μετόχια) are small monasteries or chapels that belong to a main monastery. Stavrovouni has a number of metochia, of which the most well-known is Agia Varvara at the foot of Stavrovouni hill. Until some decades ago, most of the monks used to stay at this metochi as there was no water and electricity at the top of the hill, and only two or three monks would stay at the top. Other metochia are Panagia Stazousa and Agios Modestos, which are located between the villages of Pyrga and Klavdia. Today, monks at Agia Varvara work as icon painters and in agriculture, whereas monks at the other two metochia concentrate more on prayers and live more closely to the life of a hermit.

At present, monks in Stavrovouni live a very strict form of monastic life, similar to that of the monks on Mount Athos. The rule of their first abbot, Dionysios I, forms the basis of this. Women are not allowed to enter the main part of the monastery, but they are allowed to visit the chapel out of it on the top of the hill. They are also allowed to visit the Metochi Agia Varvara at the foot of the hill only on Sundays. This rule is called avato (Greek: άβατο, meaning: entry is prohibited), and it is analogous to the strict life of monks in Mount Athos where women are not allowed to enter. This rule is applied in order to keep the monks isolated and living a stricter way of life.

Today, there are over 30 monks in Stavrovouni Monastery, and the current Abbot is Elder Dionysios.

== See also ==
- List of oldest church buildings
