= Vyzakia =

Vyzakia: Βυζακιά (Greek); Vizakya (Turkish)
- Village
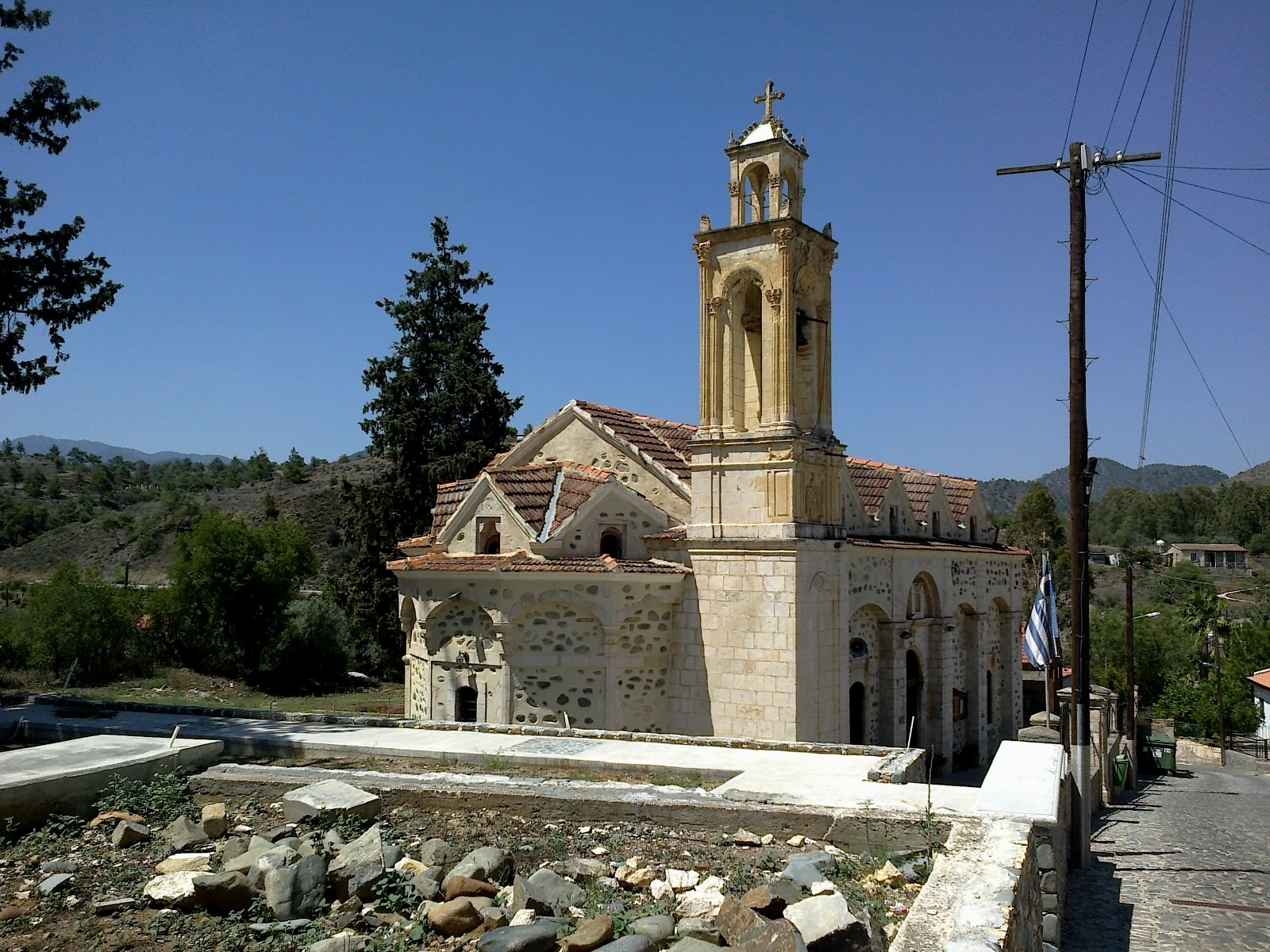
- Agia Ekaterini church

- Location in Cyprus
- Coordinates: 35°4′39″N 33°0′52″E
- Country: Cyprus
- District: Nicosia District

Population (2001)
  - Total: 384
- Time zone: UTC+2 (EET)
  - Summer (DST): UTC+3 (EEST)
- Website: http://www.vyzakia.org/

Vyzakia (Greek: Βυζακιά [locally [vizˑaˈt͡ʃa]]; Turkish: Vizakya) is a village in the Nicosia District of Cyprus, located 2 km east of Nikitari.

A village in the district of Nicosia. Built on the banks of the river Elia, 300 metres above sea level and about 9 kilometres south of Astromeritis. In older times, water mills were constructed perpendicularly to the valley of Elia, so as to serve the needs of the village as well as those of several other neighbouring communities. The village's territory sits upon pebbles, sand and clay in the north and lava in the south. Some believe that the village owes its name to the shingles carried by the river and deposited on its banks, this being one of the village's impressive elements. The traditional houses of the village with their idiosyncratic architecture have these shingles as their base, offered to them by the river of Elia, while the rest part of the structure is made with mud-bricks. The sloping, tiled roofs complete the beautiful picture of the architecture of the village's houses. The inhabitants call these pebbles "vyzatzia" (plural, referring to a breast-like figure), these being stones that were shaped so by the river. These "vyzatzia" are a characteristic observed in tens of other villages in the region. Vyzakia's landscape is also characterised by an inclination toward the valley of Morfou.

The village receives an average annual rainfall of around 350 millimetres and a large variety of produce is cultivated in its region. These crops are cereals (mainly barley), legumes, a few fruit-trees, almonds, and olives. Thyme, daffodils, prickly bushes, pines, cistuses, and many other prickly plants grow in the uncultivated slopes and the precipitous areas of the village, whereas reeds, oleanders, and eucalypti grow by the riverbed.

The population has well increased. From 124 in 1881, the inhabitants increased to 440 in the census performed in 1982. In the last census of 2001 the community's inhabitants were 384.

Vyzakia is a village with a history and tradition. According to Mas Latri, it was a feud during the Lusignan - Venetian era. According to researchers, Vyzakia was granted to Nicolas Morabit by King Jacob the "Nothos" (illegitimate).

This village however, where the nut-brown colour of lava in the summer and the deep green of the various kinds of plantations in the winter prevail, is more known for its mediaeval church of Archangel Michael. It is a small church with very interesting 16th-century frescoes in its interior.

The dam south of Vyzakia and the beautification of the landscape through irrigation and land re-allotment projects are expected to increase the vegetation and raise the living standard of the inhabitants. Nevertheless, the valley of Elia with its running water during the months of winter, the folkloric architecture of the rather mountainous village, and the church of Archangel Michael will continue being the main natural and cultural assets of Vyzakia.
