= Moutoullas =

Moutoullas: Μουτουλλάς (Greek); Mudulla (Turkish)
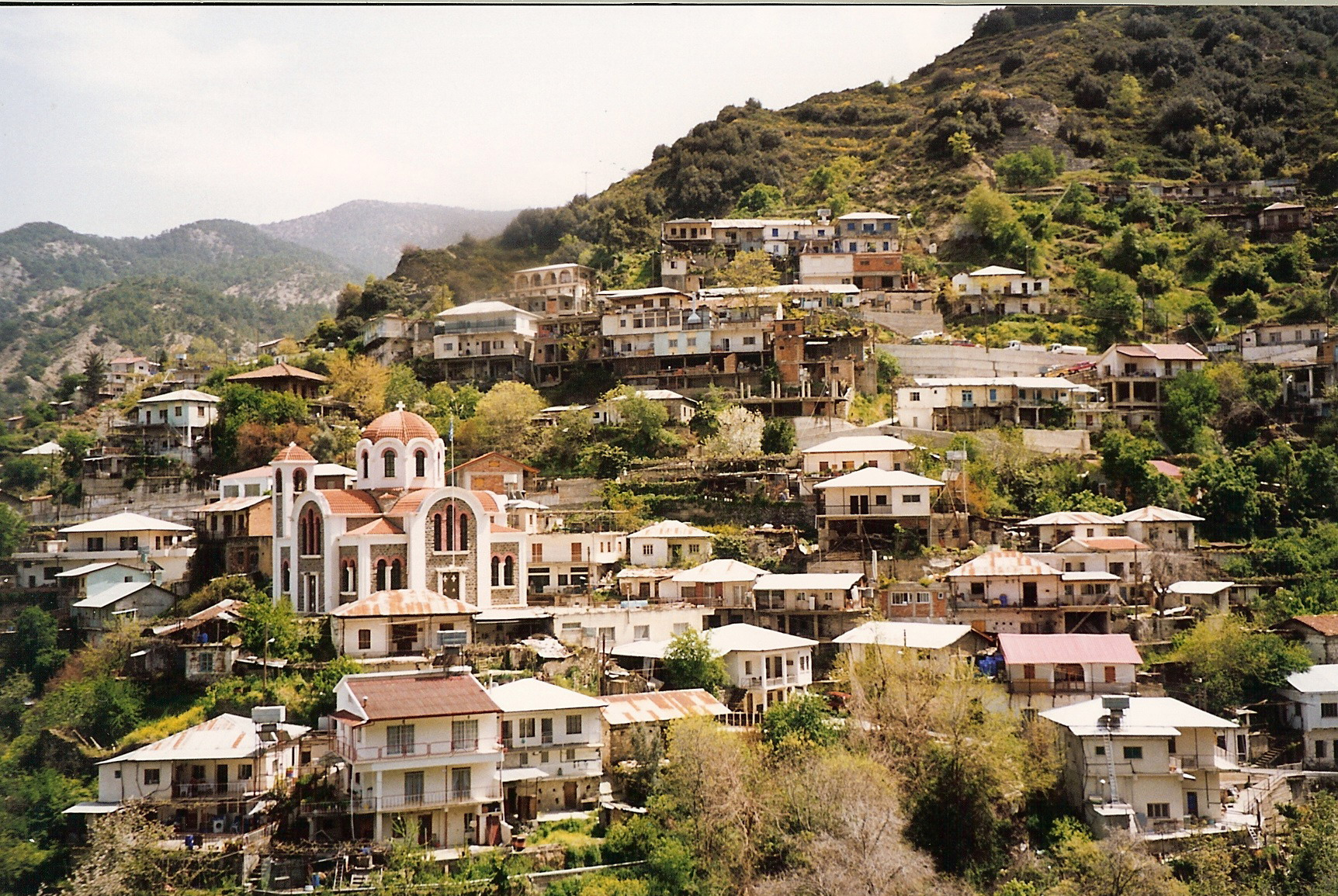

- Location within Cyprus
- Coordinates: 34°59′N 32°49′E
- Country: Cyprus
- District: Nicosia District
- Elevation: 800 m (2,600 ft)

Population (2011)
  - Total: 174
- Time zone: UTC+2 (EET)
  - Summer (DST): UTC+3 (EEST)
- Postal code: 2866
- Website: moutoullas.com.cy

Moutoullas (Greek: Μουτουλλάς [locally [mutuˈlːas]]; Turkish: Mudulla) is a mountain village in the Nicosia District of Cyprus, at an elevation of 800 m (2,600 ft) in Marathasa Valley. In 2011, it had a population of 174.

The old village church, the 13th-century chapel of Panayia tou Moutoulla, is one of the earliest-dated examples of the steep-pitched wooden roof type with frescoes. It was built in around 1280 and has been declared a UNESCO World Heritage Site, along with nine other Painted Churches in the Troodos Region, because of their unique murals and archicture.
