= Galata, Cyprus =

Galata: Γαλάτα (Greek); Galata (Turkish)
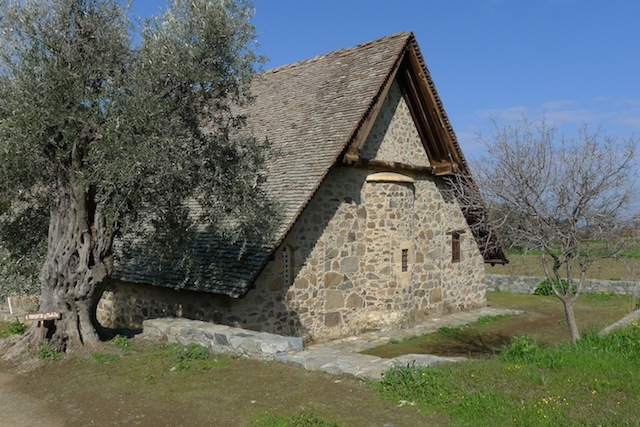
- Panagia tis Podhithou on UNESCO list

- Location within Cyprus
- Coordinates: 34°59′0″N 32°53′0″E
- Country: Cyprus
- District: Nicosia District

Population (2001)
  - Total: 653
- Time zone: UTC+2 (EET)
  - Summer (DST): UTC+3 (EEST)
- Postal code: 2827
- Website: http://www.galata.org.cy

Galata (Greek: Γαλάτα; Turkish: Galata) is a village in the Solea valley, located about 60 km west of the capital Nicosia, at an altitude of 620 m in the Troodos Mountains of Cyprus. It is a popular summer tourist destination (especially among locals) for its cooler climate in the summer months. It is also well known on the island for its fruit produce. In Galata there is Panagia tis Podithou (Greek: Παναγία της Ποδίθου), church, which was designated a UNESCO World Heritage Site in 1985 along with nine other Painted Churches in the Troödos Region, because of their unique murals and testimony to the history of Byzantine rule in Cyprus.

== Name of village and history ==
According to Greek mythology, Cyprus was the first land that Aphrodite set foot on; where Pygmalion begged her to let him be with the statue that he created in her image. Aphrodite brought the statue to life and Pygmalion married Galatea.

According to one version of villages name first settlers came from Galatia in Asia Minor. According to other version village was populated with shepherds who sold milk, that is milkmens (in Greek galataes). Leontios Machairas in his Chronicle mentioned that Galata belongs to feud of king after 1196. From his chronicles could be concluded that during Lusignan Period Galata belonged to de Giblet family. Demetrios de Coron, senior officer of House of Lusignan, after fall of Lusignans retired close to Galata, where he built the monastery Panagia tis Podithou in 1502. Russian traveler and pilgrim Vasyl Hryhorovych-Barskyi visited Galata and wrote 1735. Edward Stafford of the English Consulate of the island lived in Galata in 1691. In 1910, Galata opened its first hotel.

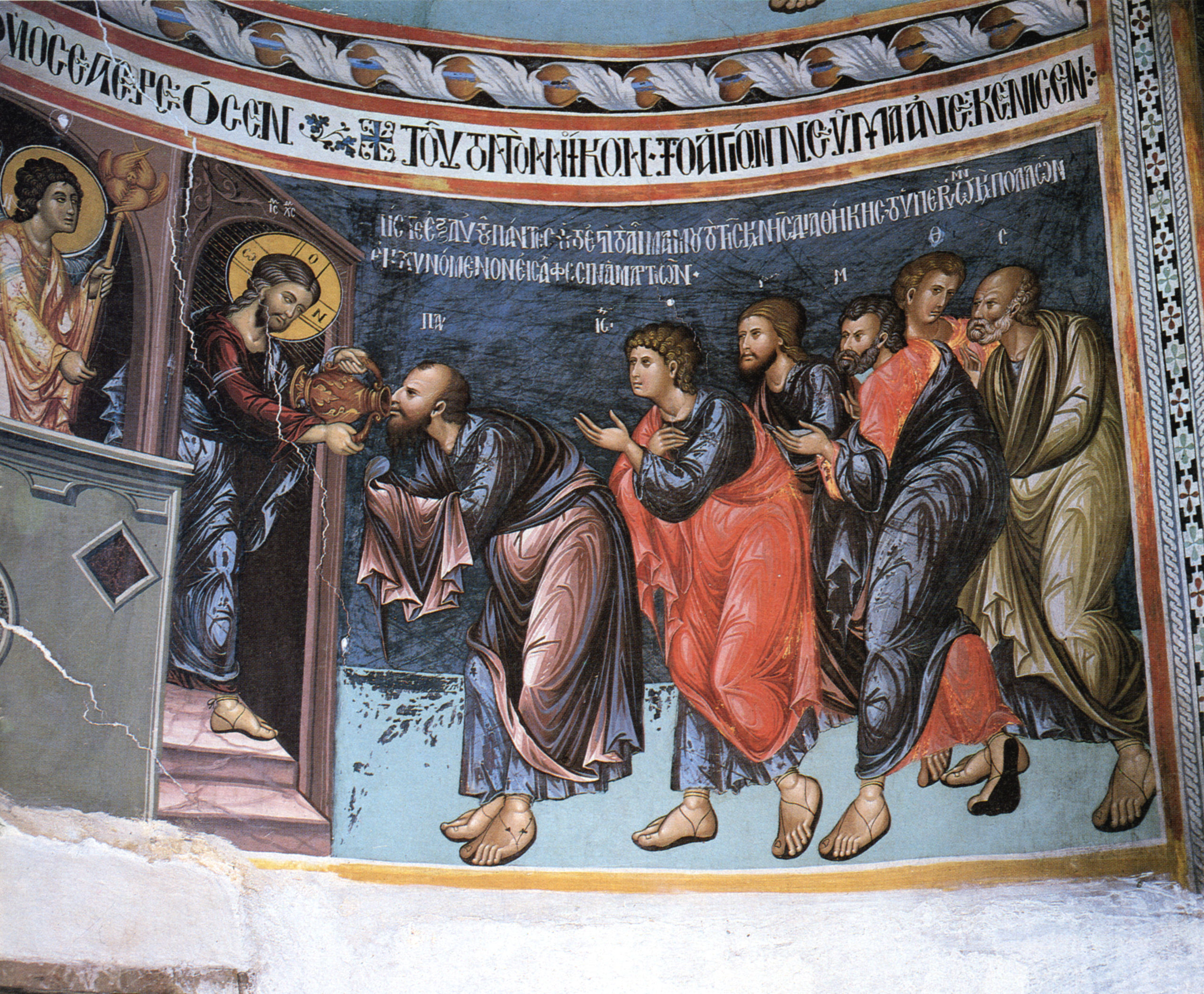

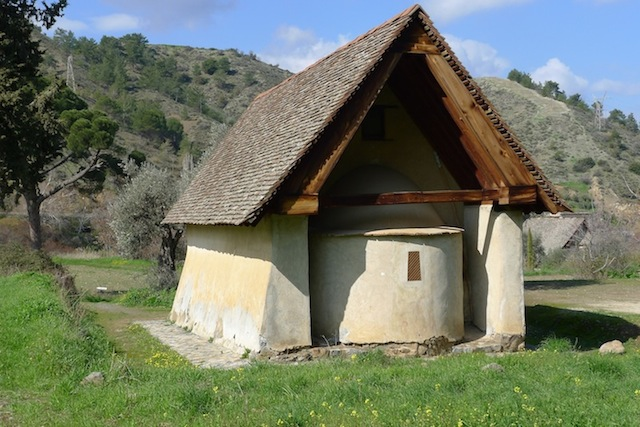
Panagia Theotokos

== Village of balconies ==
Galata is built on the banks of the Klarios River, which crosses the Solea Valley. Galata is almost merged with nearby Kakopetria.

Its traditional houses have wooden balconies and there are still many balconies in the village. They had two floors and the wooden balcony was an extension of the second floor, which faced the main road. The Museum of Folkloric Art was established in 1990. Galata had four watermills, and the watermill of "Kyrillos" is still operational.

== Churches ==
In Galata there is Panagia tis Podithou (Greek: Παναγία της Ποδίθου), church from 1502, which is a UNESCO World Heritage Site along with nine other Painted Churches in the Troödos Region. Church Panagia Theotokos/Archangel Michael from 1514. is located 100 m near Panagia tis Podithou. Small church Agios Sozomenos from 1513 is in middle of village near big main Galata church Panagia Odegetria (Virgin Mary guiding), built in 1930. Agia Paraskevi and Agios Georgios are small 16th century churches on road between Galata and Kakopetria. Agios Nicolaos is small church from the 15th century at western entrance of Galata.
