= Pelendri =

Pelendri Πελένδρι Pelentri or Pelendria
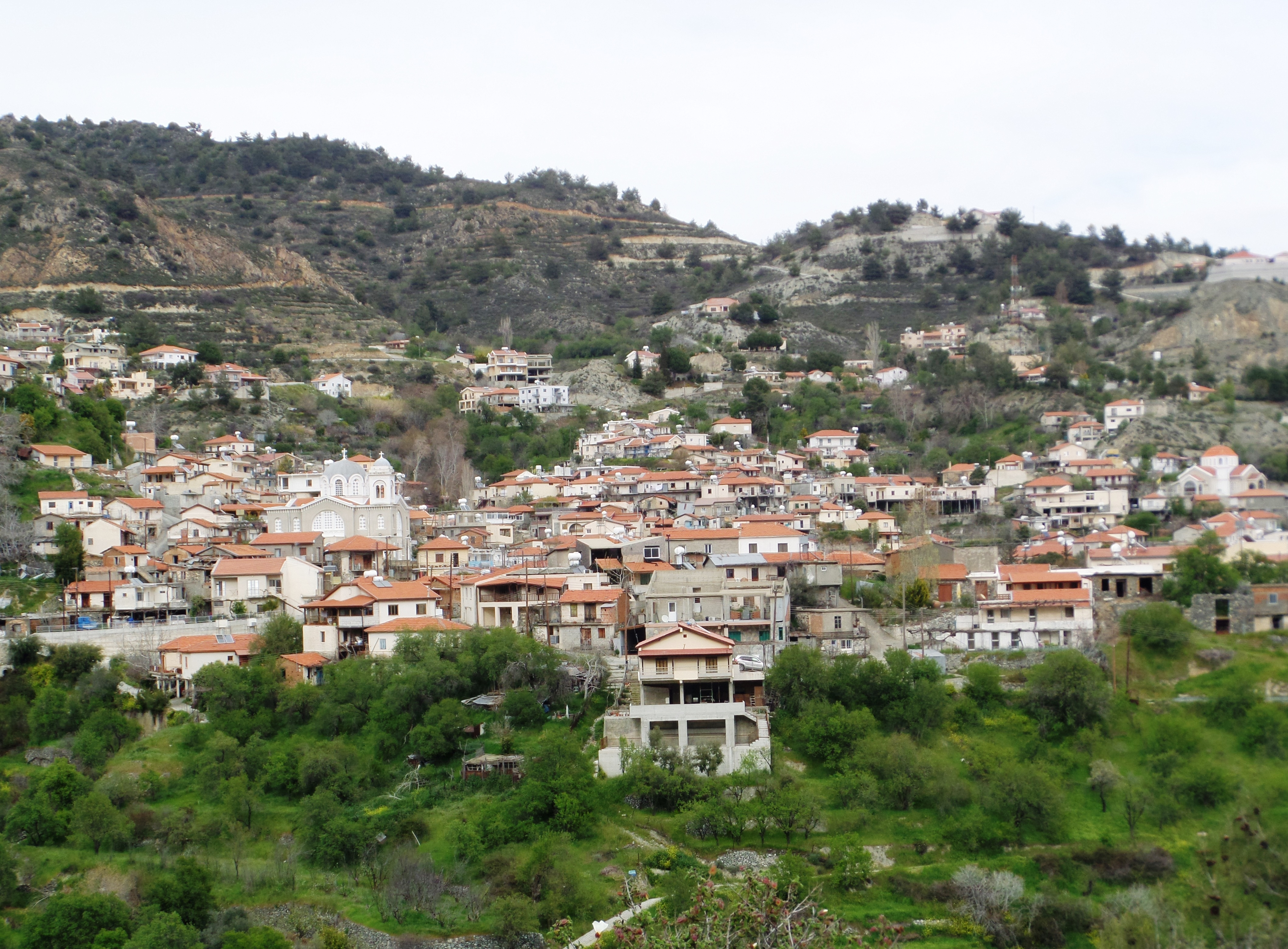
- Pelendri village

- Location in Cyprus
- Coordinates: 34°53′45″N 32°57′54″E
- Country: Cyprus
- District: Limassol District

Population (2001)
  - Total: 1,185
- Time zone: UTC+2 (EET)
  - Summer (DST): UTC+3 (EEST)
- Postal code: 4878
- Website: www.pelendri.org

Pelendri (Greek: Πελένδρι, Turkish: Pelendri) is a village in the Limassol District of Cyprus.

== Location ==
Pelendri is located below the Troodos Mountains, in the region of Pitsilia. It is located on a barren hillside, at an altitude of 800 meters above sea level, 40 kilometers from the city of Limassol. Adjacent to the Trimiklini villages Saittas, Potamitissa and Amiandos.

== Physical geography ==
=== Geology ===
The terrain is rugged and mountainous with narrow deep valleys and steep slopes. On three sides of the village loom tall peaks, their height in many cases exceeding 1000 metres.

=== Climate, flora and vegetation ===
The climate of the region combined with the relatively high annual rainfall received by the village (about 750 millimetres) favours the cultivation of various fruit trees (apple, peach, pear), grapevines, olive, almond, nuts, raspberries and vegetables (green beans, peas, tomatoes, cucumbers, onions, zucchini, potatoes).

However, due to the relief of the area there are several uncultivated areas with a rich presence of natural vegetation. Here there are a variety of plants: πεύκων, λατζιές, αντρουκλιές, τρεμιθιές, ξυσταριές, περνιές, αγριοελιές, σκλήδρους, πλατάνους, μερσινιές. Part of the Troodos and Monastery state forests are within the administrative boundaries of Pelendri.

== History ==
Pelendri was a well-known settlement during the Middle Ages. Louis de Mas Latrie refers to it as Pelendres or Pelondres. He also says that in 1353 it was a fief of John de Lusignan, Prince of Antioch and a member of the royal family of Cyprus. The medieval chronicler Georgios Boustronios mentioned the village twice in his chronicle. In one case he mentions that in around 1461, a rich trader named Satin lived in the village. In the second, he speaks of two Prastio (farms) in Pelendri owned by Ritzzo di Marino. They were seized in 1474 by Catherine Cornaro. These two farms, Kardamas (Kardama) and Filagra, were dissolved during the Ottoman occupation. Filagra was re-established in the mid 20th century.

The church of 'Timios Stavros' was built in the 14th century and is one of the best preserved Byzantine churches in Cyprus. It, along with 9 other Painted Churches in the Troödos Region were inscribed as a UNESCO World Heritage Site in 1985 because of their outstanding frescoes and testimony to the history of Byzantine rule in Cyprus.

According to narratives, there were still 14 small villages in the area. They were abandoned, their residents joining with those of Pelendri for security. As such villages reads: Poulos, in which many important archaeological artefacts of the era of Alexander the Great were found, Fournia, in which there are traces of old settlement, Troumithos, in which there is a very old chalcopyrite mine, the Tzeramis, which was completely destroyed by a landslide, Rontia, Konnara, Kaminia, Mazokampos, Chalazin, Argyrou, Deisis, Ais Giannis Potamoulion, Pontikia and Kountouries.

== Population history ==
Population history of Pelendri
Census	Population	Comments
1881	444	The census does not distinguish the inhabitants according to their religion or nationality.
1891	515	514 non-Muslims, 1 Muslim.
1901	579	Only non-Muslims.
1911	715	714 non-Muslims, 1 Muslim.
1921	798	798 non-Muslims, 1 Muslim.
1931	982	982 Christians, 1 Muslim.
1946	1504	1503 Greeks Orthodox, 1 Muslim Turkish.
1960	2094	Only Greeks.
1973	2253	Only Greek Cypriots.
1976	2218	Only Greek Cypriots.
1982	1739	Only Greek Cypriots.
1992	1377	Only Greek Cypriots.
2001	1185	Only Greek Cypriots.
2011	1074	Only Greek Cypriots.
The comments refer to the separation of the residents according to their religion or nationality as it was in the corresponding census.
