= Agios Prokopios =

Beach village in Naxos, Greece

Coordinates: 37°4′30″N 25°21′6″E

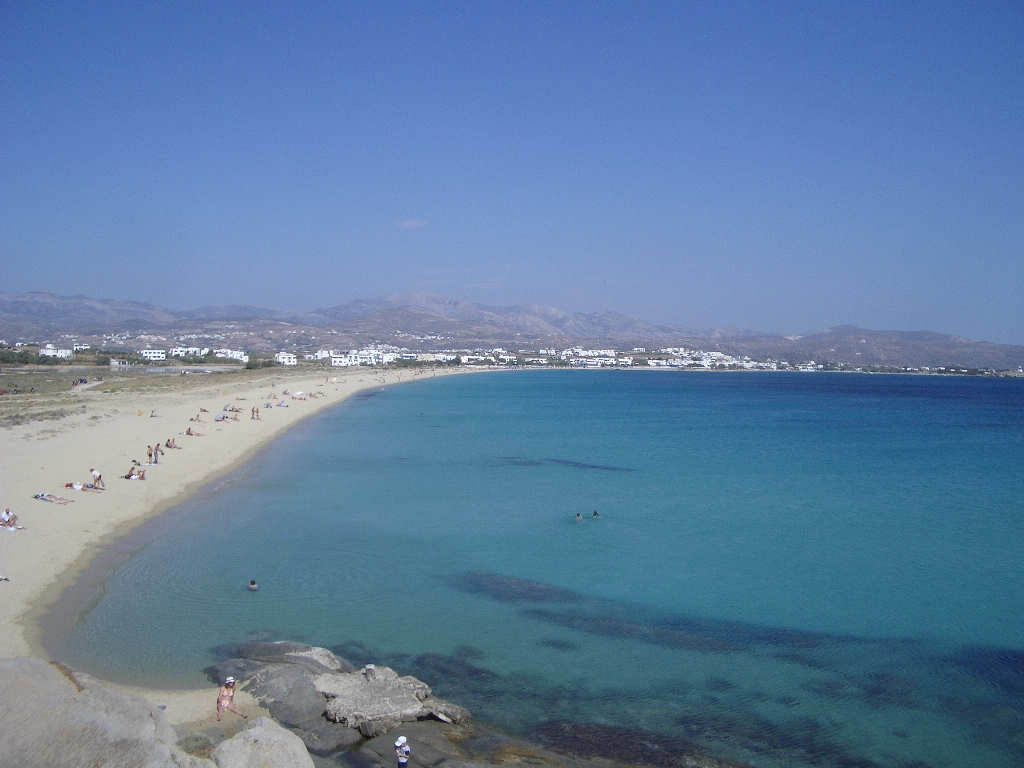
The beach of Agios Prokopios

Agios Prokopios (Greek: Άγιος Προκόπιος) is a seaside village on the island of Naxos, Greece. It is known for its beaches on the Aegean and is a favorite tourist attraction.

At the 2021 census it numbered 182 residents.

== Tourism ==
Agios Prokopios is a hot spot for tourists. Apart from the long sandy beaches, the village itself has a small church. Not far from it is a resort place by the name of Stelida. The "Red Lake" is another attraction near the village; flocks of herons are known to use the spot as a resting place before continuing their migratory flight to Africa.

July 8 there is an annual religious feast in honour of Agios Prokopios.
