= Monagri =

Monagri Μονάγρι
- Village
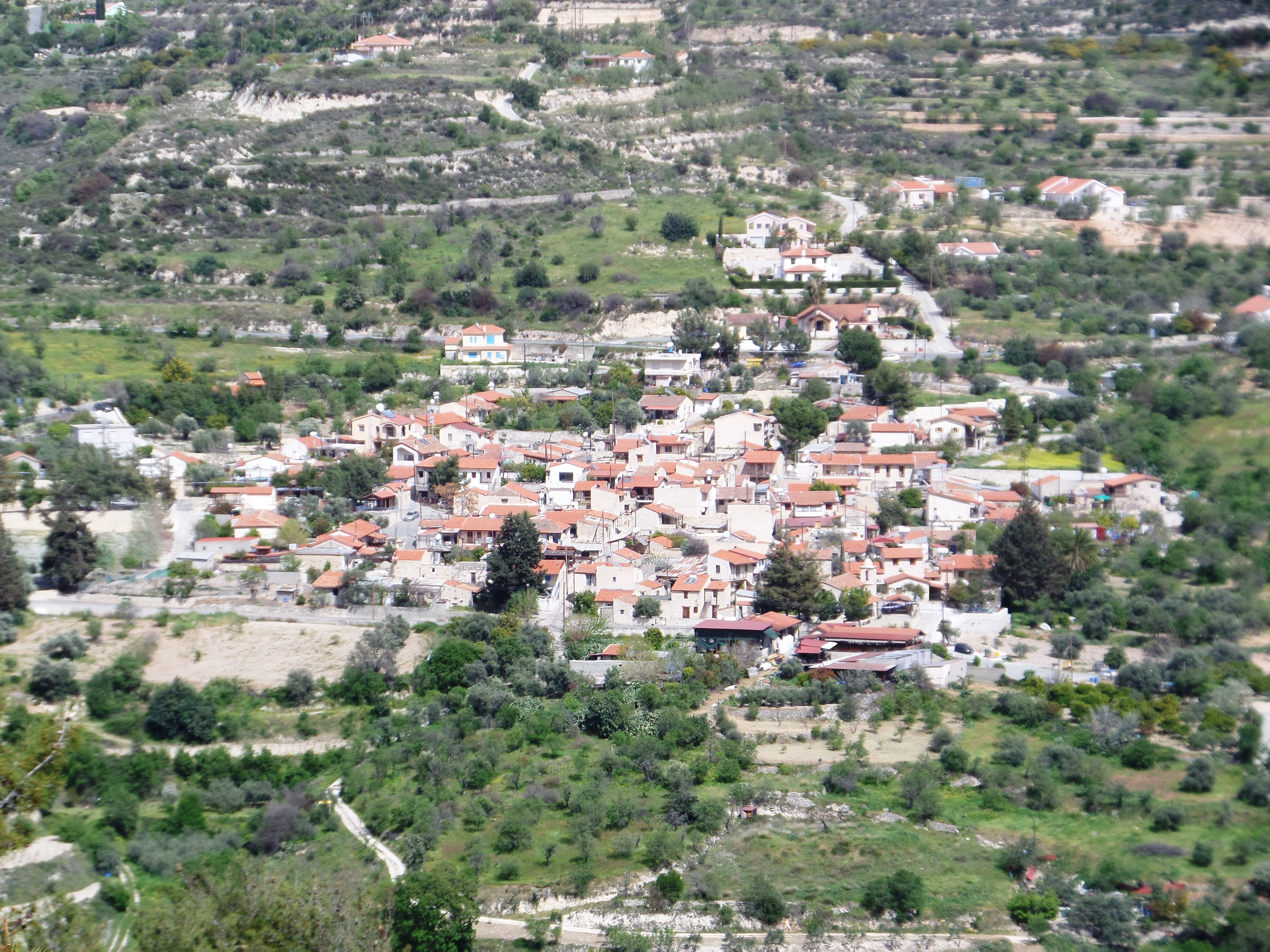

- Location in Cyprus
- Coordinates: 34°48′33″N 32°54′38″E
- Country: Cyprus
- District: Limassol District

Population (2001)
  - Total: 173
- Time zone: UTC+2 (EET)
  - Summer (DST): UTC+3 (EEST)

Monagri (Greek: Μονάγρι) is a village in the Limassol District of Cyprus, located 20 km north of Limassol.
