= Askas =

Askas: Ασκάς (Greek); Aska (Turkish)
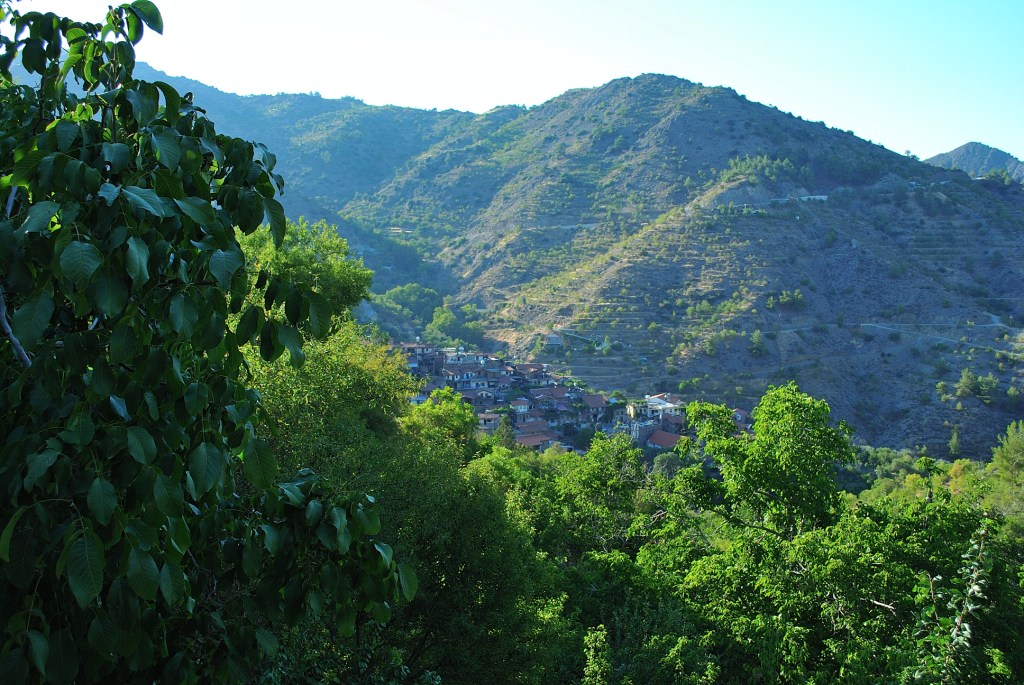

- Location in Cyprus
- Coordinates: 34°56′N 33°05′E
- Country: Cyprus
- District: Nicosia District

Population (2001)
  - Total: 187
- Time zone: UTC+2 (EET)
  - Summer (DST): UTC+3 (EEST)
- Website: http://www.askas.org/

Askas (Greek: Ασκάς; Turkish: Aska) is a small village in Pitsilia region in the Nicosia District on the island of Cyprus. It is positioned 1000 metres above sea level on the north side of the Troodos mountain range, at the foot of Mount Papoutsa. Ioannis Constantinou is the president of the Community Council of Askas.

Askas, like all the villages of the area, has gone through fluctuations of its population. In 1881 its inhabitants numbered 142, increasing to 333 in 1911, and to 439 in 1946. In 1960 the population decreased to 363, and to 321 in 1982. In the 2001 census the village numbered 187 inhabitants.

The village lies close to the Nicosia - Limassol administrative borders, having a distance of about 50 kilometres from Nicosia and just two kilometres west of Palaichori Morphou, receiving an Average annual rainfall is of about 800 millimetres. In this region mainly are cultivated vines of the wine-making variety, vegetables, hazel, walnut, and olive trees, fruit-trees, almond trees, and forage plants.

The village is connected via road to Palaichori in the east and from there on to Nicosia, to Agros in the south-west, and to Alona, Cyprus, Polystypos, and Kyperounta in the west.

The houses, apart from the recent ones, are traditionally built entirely with local materials: the stone, the clay, and the pinewood from the surrounding mountains. The roofs have tiles, all "kneaded" and "baked" locally.

The village's history is lost in the depths of time. No one knows exactly when the village was built and when it was first inhabited. One specific testimony is a date found on the front of an internal door, in the basement of Theofanis's house where the earthenware jars were kept. It was covered with a thin layer of clay. However, one day someone leaned on it with his hand and the clay fell off, revealing the date 1381. This indicates that the village was in existence during the Frank Domination era, without that meaning it did not exist before that.

There are two churches in the village. One is church Timios Prodromos, dedicated to the Holy Baptist (John) and the other is the Church of Timios Stavros, dedicated to the Holy Cross. There is also the country church of "Agia Christina" that today is called the country church of "Agia Paraskevi".

The village -under its present name -was not included in the list of Lusignan - Venetian feuds and royal estates of Mas Latri. However, it is most probable that the "Asta" settlement that is found marked in the Venetian maps is Askas.

According to one version, the village's name is due to its first settler who was a skin-bag maker. Another version reports that it took its name from a medieval family of nobles that was surnamed Askas.

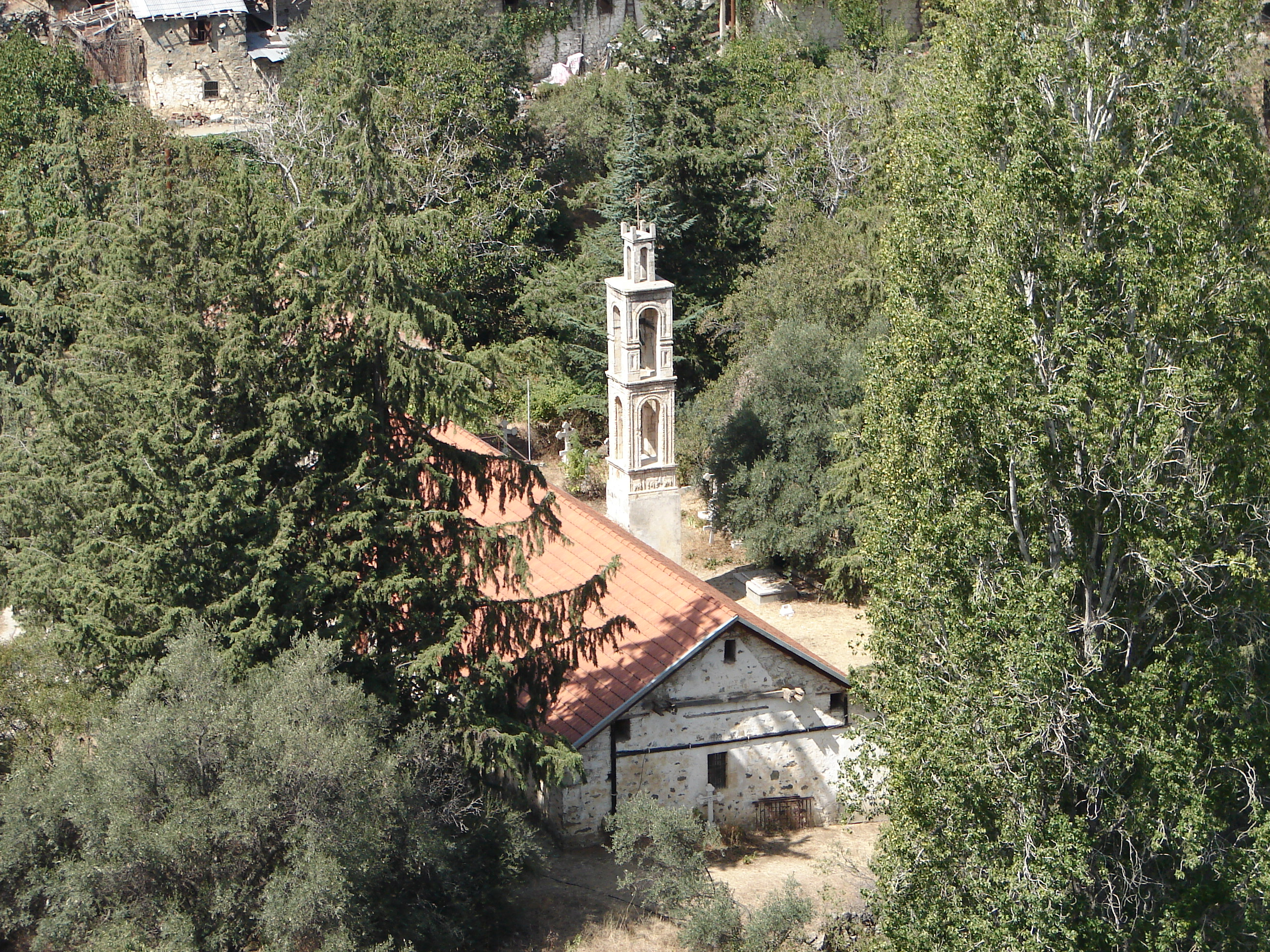
Timios Prodromos church

== Sources ==
- Askas History
- Askas Tour
