= Koutsovendis =

Koutsovendis: Κουτσοβέντης (Greek); Güngör (Turkish); Koutsoventis
- Village
- Location in Cyprus
- Coordinates: 35°15′56″N 33°25′14″E
- Country (de jure): Cyprus
  - District: Kyrenia District
- Country (de facto): Northern Cyprus
  - District: Girne District
- Time zone: UTC+2 (EET)
  - Summer (DST): UTC+3 (EEST)

Koutsovendis or Koutsoventis (Greek: Κουτσοβέντης, Turkish: Güngör) is a village in the Kyrenia District of Cyprus. It is under the de facto control of Northern Cyprus.

== Monastery of St. John Chrysostomos ==
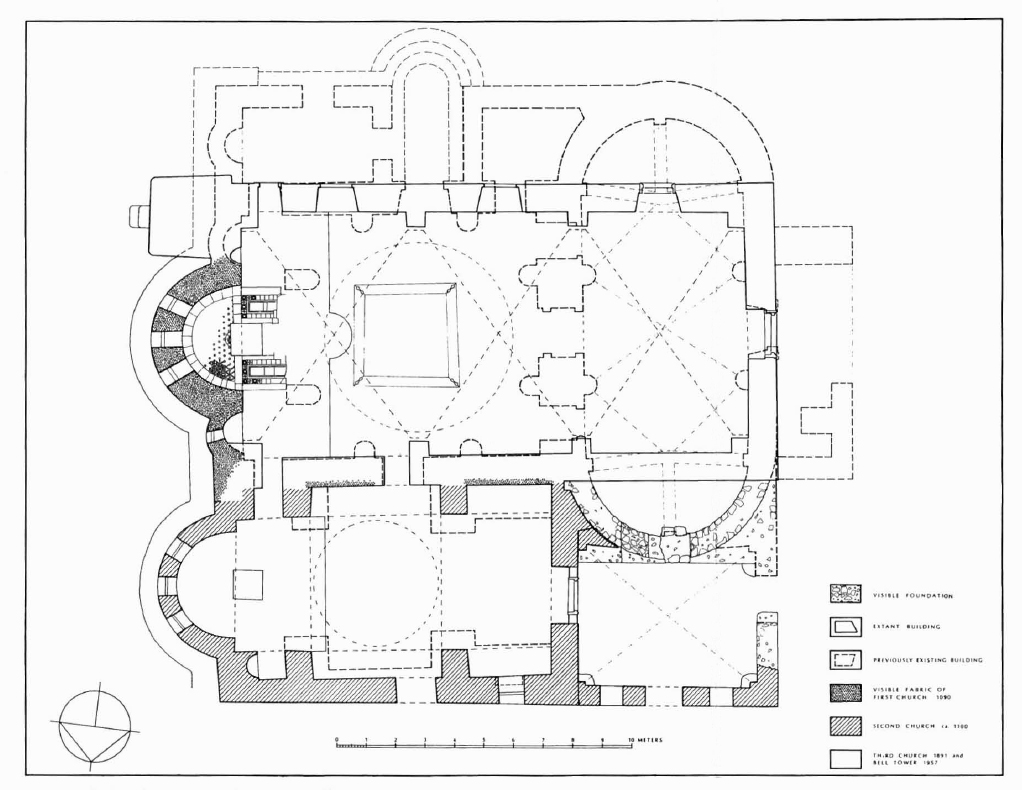
Koutsovendis, Cyprus, floor plan of Saint John Chrysostomos or Agios Ioannis Chrysostomos (Άγιος Ιωάννης Χρυσόστομος)

Just north of the village (at 35.27439, 33.41835) is the Monastery of Saint John Chrysostomos or Agios Ioannis Chrysostomos (Άγιος Ιωάννης Χρυσόστομος). It is also known as Hagios Chrysostomos. The monastery was founded about 1070 by the monk George from the Levant. The monastery is known for its murals, which are currently whitewashed over and covered in white paper as the area is in a Turkish militarized zone and has been since 1974. The church is now inaccessible. The monastery consists of two churches that connected with a shared wall. Headquarters for the monastery are presently located in Nicosia due to the Turkish occupation.

The original south church was destroyed and rebuilt in 1891. This building was the katholikon of the entire monastery. The new south church was rebuilt on the foundations of the old structure and in a rectangular fashion, having three bays, and is covered by pointed cross-groin vaults. Surviving portions of the original church include the pavement, marble door frames, and a carved wooden door.

The north church, dedicated to the Holy Trinity, is what would be considered a "compressed cross-in-square type" that is off axis due to the narthex of the south church that projects into its space. The founder of the chapel and donor for the painted decorations was the Governor of Cyprus, Eumathios Philokales. Out of all the Byzantine era buildings in the relative location, this is the most well preserved. The architectural type is that of a single aisle domed structure. While the building is created largely from brick, what is unique is that the dome is also constructed of brick alternating with stone that is framed by bricks.

== Wall Paintings at the Monastery of St. John Chrysostomos ==
The restoration of wall paintings at Koutsovendis was carried out by Dumbarton Oaks in 1963 and 1968-1969. Further visits and restoration projects have been prevented due to Turkish occupation of the area. While not all the paintings are in good condition, if they exist at all, some that have been eroded show preliminary sketches. Many of the original frescoes included details of gold, vermilion, and lapis lazuli.

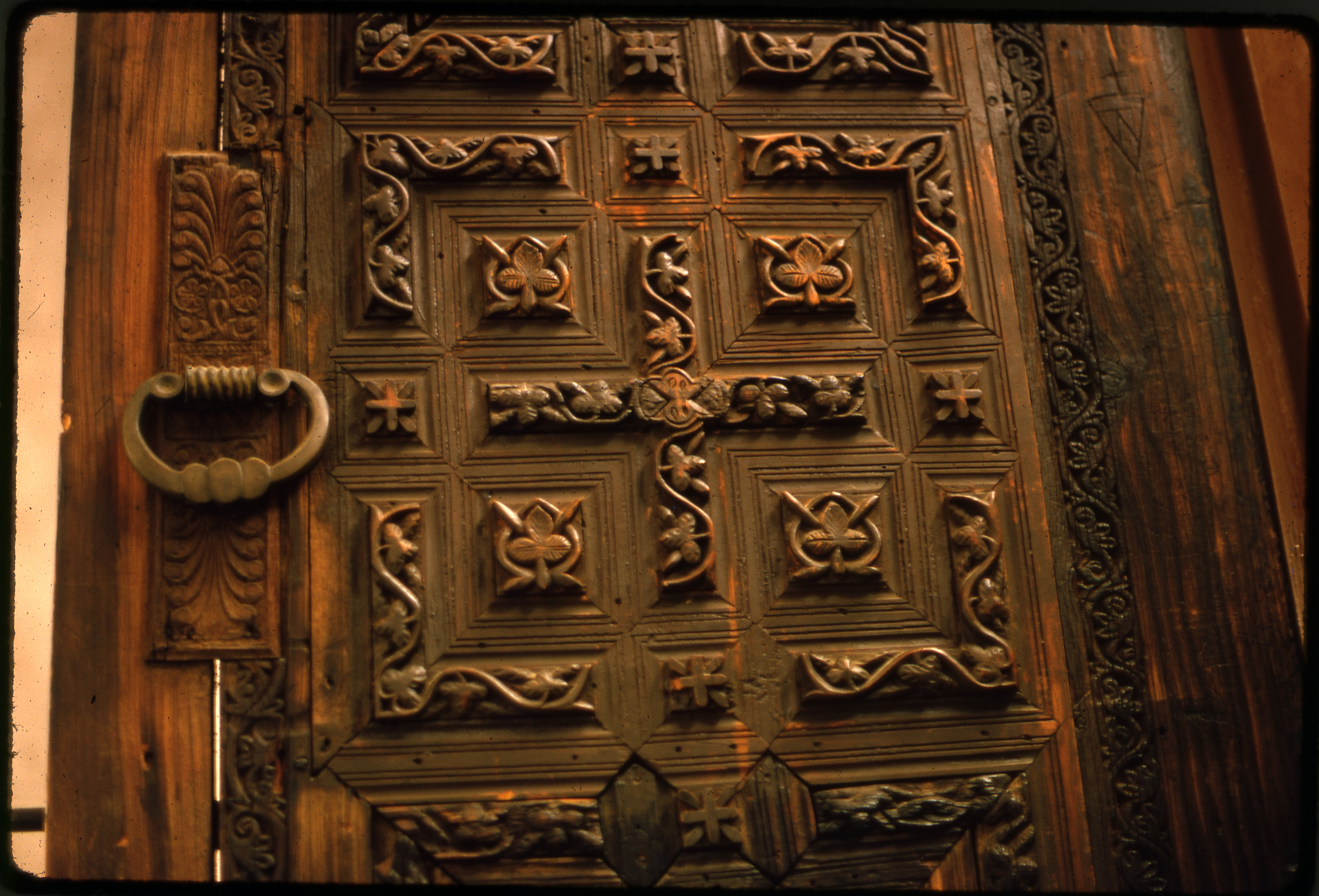
Koutsovendis, Cyprus, detail of the doors of the main church, circa twelfth century, as documented in 1973.

=== Frescoes on the Dome ===
In respect to the dome, the entire interior surface was at one point covered entirely in a single composition depicting the Pentecost. Between each of the twelve windows sat apostles. All that remains currently are remnants and preliminary sketches made in red ocher upon bare masonry. Around the calotte of the dome are remnants of two circles that would have represented the glory of the Etimasia. There exists a segment of a halo between windows nine and ten.

A larger section of the painting still remains between windows ten and eleven and shows the upper half of a seated figure. A majority of the head is missing, but the beard and lower segment of the halo can still be seen. One can see the fold of his chlamys pass from his left shoulder to the height of his right knee .

While no painting exists between windows eleven and twelve, there is a preserved drawing on the plaster and masonry. The figure appears to be St. Peter with a short beard and curly hair. The right hand is lifted with the palm facing outward in the form of blessing with the left hand holding a scroll.

=== Frescoes in the Apse ===
Unfortunately, much of the decoration within the apse was destroyed due to the central portion collapsing. However, there is still some fragmentary fresco decoration throughout. In the conch of the apse, one can discern two archangels standing against a dark blue background. One holds an orb while the other grasps a staff. All that is left of the leftmost angel is the outer edge of the right wing and the orb that was held in his right hand. The second archangel is just as poorly preserved. Part of the wing is discernible in an under painting along with the lower half of the staff. Between the angels stands the Virgin Mary. These three figures reside above a life sized procession of bishops clothed in pale garments and holding open scrolls. While only two can still be seen on either side of the bema, it is thought that there were originally eight. One of the bishops is perhaps St. Basil, but the other remaining figure remains nameless. The bishop thought to be St. Basil, located on the north wall of the bema, is preserved to below the knees and exhibits short dark hair and a long beard.The scroll is held in both hands and bears a text from the prayer of the first antiphon of St. Basil's liturgy.

The vault of the bema holds a fresco of the Ascension with, what would have been six, apostles looking up at Christ being carried by four angels in a mandorla. All that remains of the angels is the right arm, right wing, and a portion of the halo. On the north side there are only remnants of two apostles. The leftmost figure is presented in a three-quarter view from behind. His right hand is seen shielding his eyes. The second apostle is painted in a more profile view. His entire right half is missing along with his left arm. He is shown in a gray tunic and purple-brown chlamys. The south side has only one remaining apostle. His body faces west while the head is turned in the eastward direction. The right arm has not been preserved, but within the apostle's left hand a tied scroll is held.

Upon the face of the apse, in the southeast corner of the bema, there remains fragments of a bishop from just below the eyes to elbow level. His brown beard is outlined in white while coming to a point at the collarbone. Dressed in a brown mantle and a white epitrachelion adorned with small black crosses, the bishop holds a gilded book in his left hand.

=== The South Wall ===
Approximately one-eighth of the painted surface of the south wall has been preserved. These fragments can be found in the soffit of the arch, a low register on the wall, and on the dado below the lowest register. Within the soffit was seven medallions with the busts of saints. There is only one that is well preserved."The medallions were 72-74 cm in diameter, including the yellow-ochre frame...which was outlines with an inner black line and an outer white line. The background of the soffit was a blue-black and that of the medallions alternately green and red...the haloes of all the saints were yellow ochre, outlines in white and red-brown along the outer circumference."

The entire south wall was covered with a fresco of the Anastasis originally. A door has been placed incorrectly due to construction to preserve the integrity of the building, so it seems as if the painting is cut short on one side. What remains of the composition are fragments of Christ towards the middle of the image, David, Solomon, and John the Baptist on the left side of Christ, and the remaining hand that would have belonged to Adam on the right side. All that remains of Christ is his head and the portion of his body extending form his hips to just below the knees. He is flanked by two angels on the left side of his head. John displays his characteristic shaggy hair and beard. His right arm is positioned pointing towards Christ while holding a folded scroll in his left. "David and Solomon stand in identical poses, their left arms raised in the same awkward vertical position, and are dressed in the same costume...The two prophets wear identical crowns composed of six "gold" (yellow ochre) plaques,". Solomon is shown without a beard and as a man of youth adorned with a gilded halo. All three prophets are shown standing on a marble sarcophagus.

=== The North Wall ===
The north wall lacks remains of the wall paintings. There were originally four compositions that were arranged within three registers: The Betrayal, the Judgement of Pilate, and the Road to Calvary, and a depiction of the Crucifixion in the lower section. Only the outer circumference of the painting of the Betrayal survives along with an inscription.

== Bibliography ==
Carr, Annemarie Weyl. "Dumbarton Oaks and the Legacy of Byzantine Cyprus." Near Eastern Archaeology 71, no. 1/2 (2008): 95- 103. JSTOR 20361353.

Kelly, John N.D. Golden Mouth: The Story of John Chrysostom- Ascetic, Preacher, Bishop. Ithaca, NY: Cornell Univ. Press, 2011.

Mango, Cyril, E. J. W. Hawkins, and Susan Boyd. "The Monastery of St. Chrysostomos at Koutsovendis (Cyprus) and Its Wall Paintings. Part I: Description." Dumbarton Oaks Papers 44 (1990): 63-94. doi:10.2307/1291618

Papacostas, Tassos, Cyril Mango, and Michael Grünbart. "The History and Architecture of the Monastery of Saint John Chrysostomos at Koutsovendis, Cyprus." Dumbarton Oaks Papers 61 (2007): 25-156. JSTOR 25472047.

Parani, Maria. "The Monastery of St. Chrysostomos at Koutsovendis, Cyprus: The Wall-Paintings." Dumbarton Oaks. March 16, 2017. Accessed October 21, 2017. http://www.doaks.org/research/support-for-research/fellowships/reports/2004-2005/parani.
