= Sychari =

Sychari: Συγχαρί (Greek); Aşağı Taşkent (Turkish)
- Village
- Location in Cyprus
- Coordinates: 35°16′41″N 33°22′38″E
- Country (de jure): Cyprus
  - District: Kyrenia District
- Country (de facto): Northern Cyprus
  - District: Girne District

Population (2011)
  - Total: 290
- Time zone: UTC+2 (EET)
  - Summer (DST): UTC+3 (EEST)

Sychari or Sichari (Greek: Συγχαρί [locally [sixːaˈɾi]]; Turkish: Aşağı Taşkent or Kaynakköy) is a village in the Kyrenia District of Cyprus. De facto, it is under the control of Northern Cyprus. Its population in 2011 was 290.
