= Platanistasa =

Platanistasa: Πλατανιστάσα (Greek); Platanistasa (Turkish)
- Village
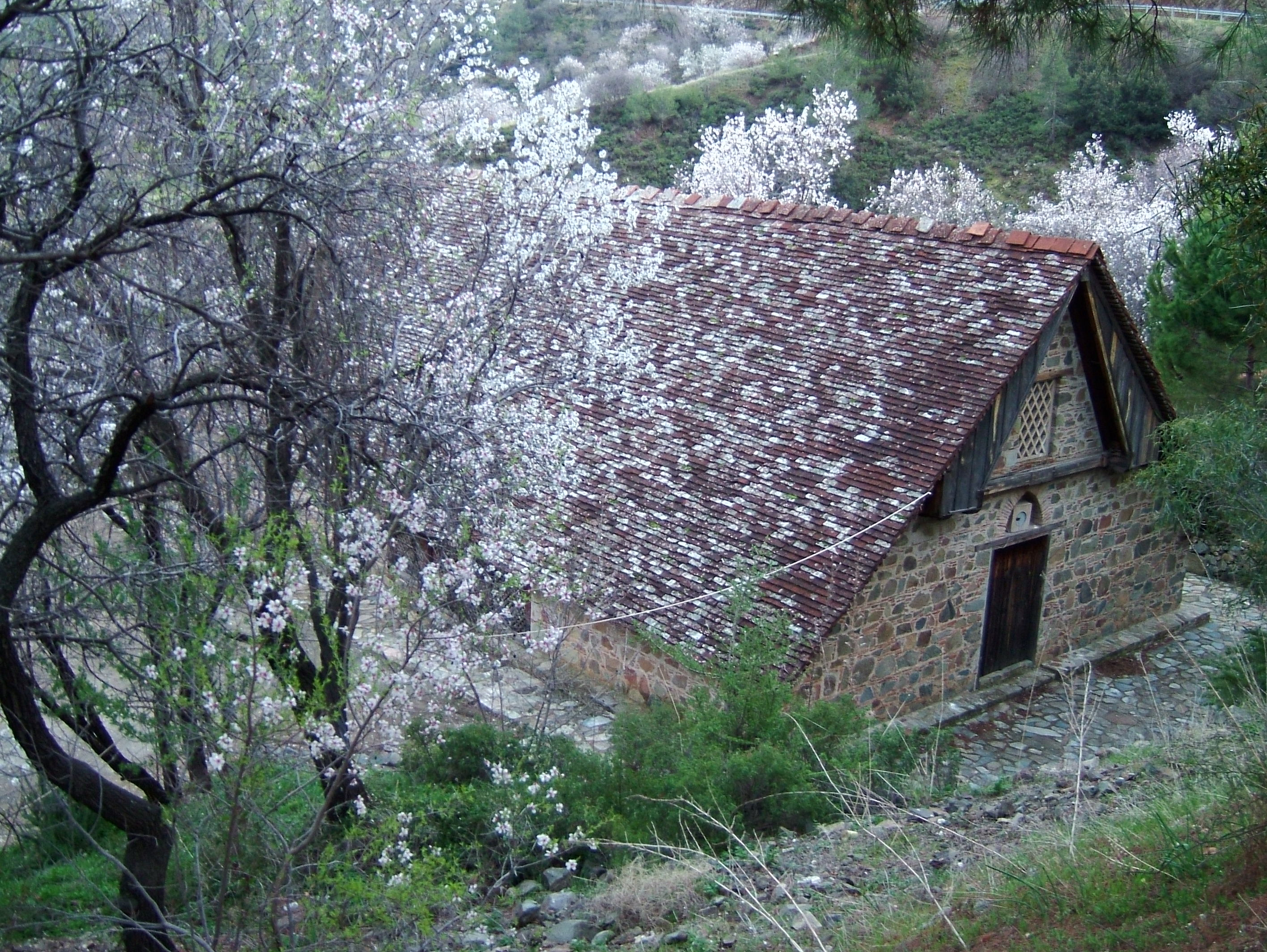
- Stavros Agiasmati on UNESCO list

- Location in Cyprus
- Coordinates: 34°56′47″N 33°2′41″E
- Country: Cyprus
- District: Nicosia District
- Elevation: 3,120 ft (950 m)

Population (2001)
  - Total: 172
- Time zone: UTC+2 (EET)
  - Summer (DST): UTC+3 (EEST)
- Website: http://www.platanistasa.org/

Platanistasa (Greek: Πλατανιστάσα; Turkish: Platanistasa) is a village in the Nicosia District of Cyprus, located 14 km southwest of Mitsero. Platanistasa is in the northern side of Troodos in Pitsilia region. The average altitude of Platanistasa is 940 meters. Pre-Christian graves are found in the village. The village of Platanistasa together with some other villages was granted 1474 to relative of Catherine Cornaro, Queen of Cyprus. In Platanistasa there is Stavros tou Agiasmati (Greek: Σταυρός του Αγιασμάτι, Holy Cross of Agiasmati) church, which is a UNESCO World Heritage Site along with nine other Painted Churches in the Troödos Region.
