= Nikitari =

Nikitari: Νικητάρι (Greek); Nikitari (Turkish)
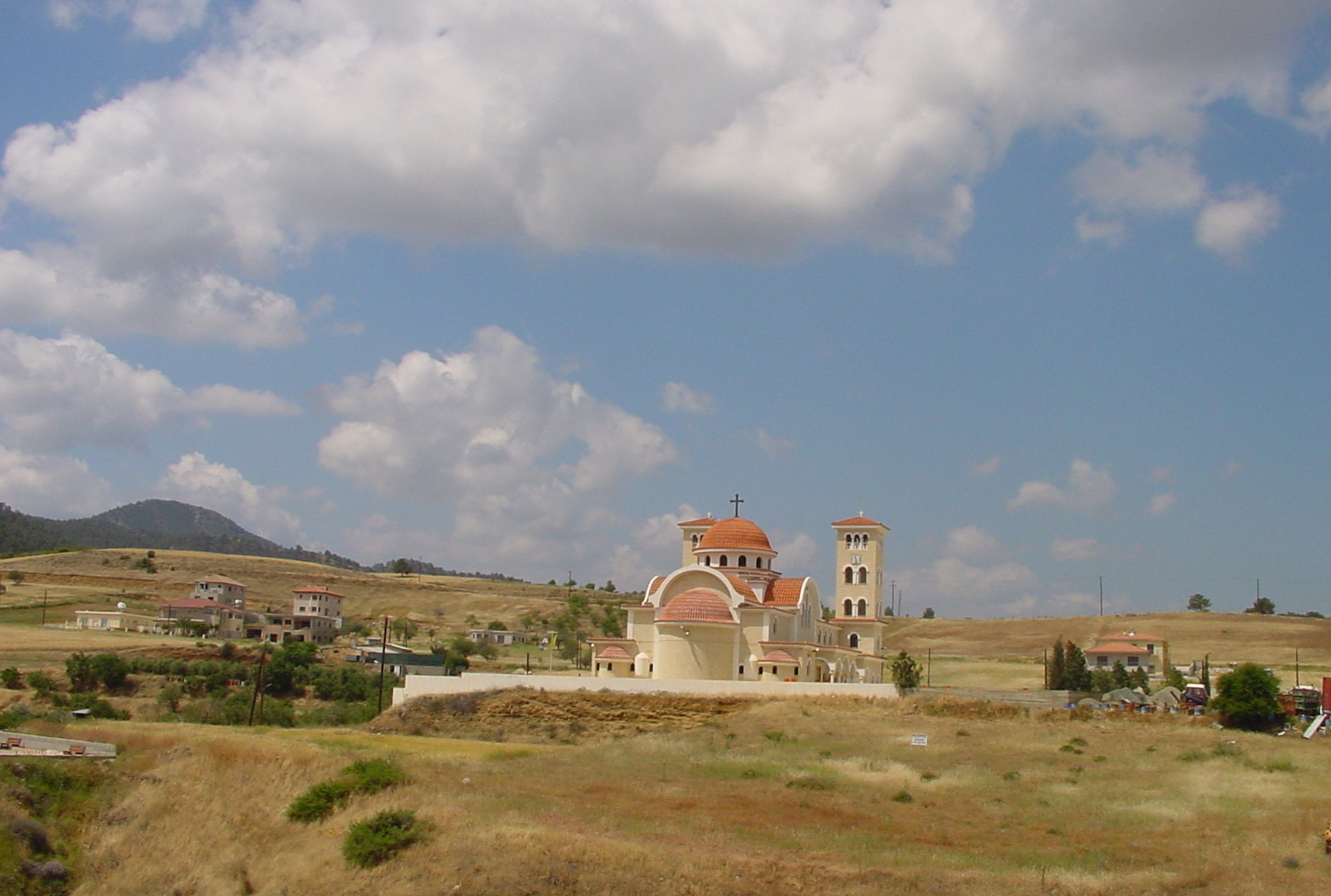
- Church in Nikitari

- Location in Cyprus
- Coordinates: 35°4′0″N 32°59′0″E
- Country: Cyprus
- District: Nicosia District

Population (2001)
  - Total: 426
- Time zone: UTC+2 (EET)
  - Summer (DST): UTC+3 (EEST)

Nikitari (Greek: Νικητάρι; Turkish: Nikitari) is a village in Cyprus. It is located in the Nicosia District.

== UNESCO site— Panagia tis Asinou ==
Very close to Nikitari (5 km) is the church of Asinou, Panagia tis Asinou (Greek: Παναγία της Ασίνου), also called Panagia Forviotissa (Greek: Παναγία Φορβιώτισσας). It is a 12th-century church, dedicated to the Virgin Mary, with frescoes from the 12th century and later periods, considered to be among the finest examples of Byzantine mural painting on the island of Cyprus. It was designated a UNESCO World Heritage Site in 1985 along with nine other Painted Churches in the Troödos Region, because of their outstanding artwork and testimony to the history of Byzantine rule in Cyprus. The site was declared an ancient monument in April 1932. It was briefly referenced by George Jeffrey and later studied more extensively by a team William Hepburn Buckler.

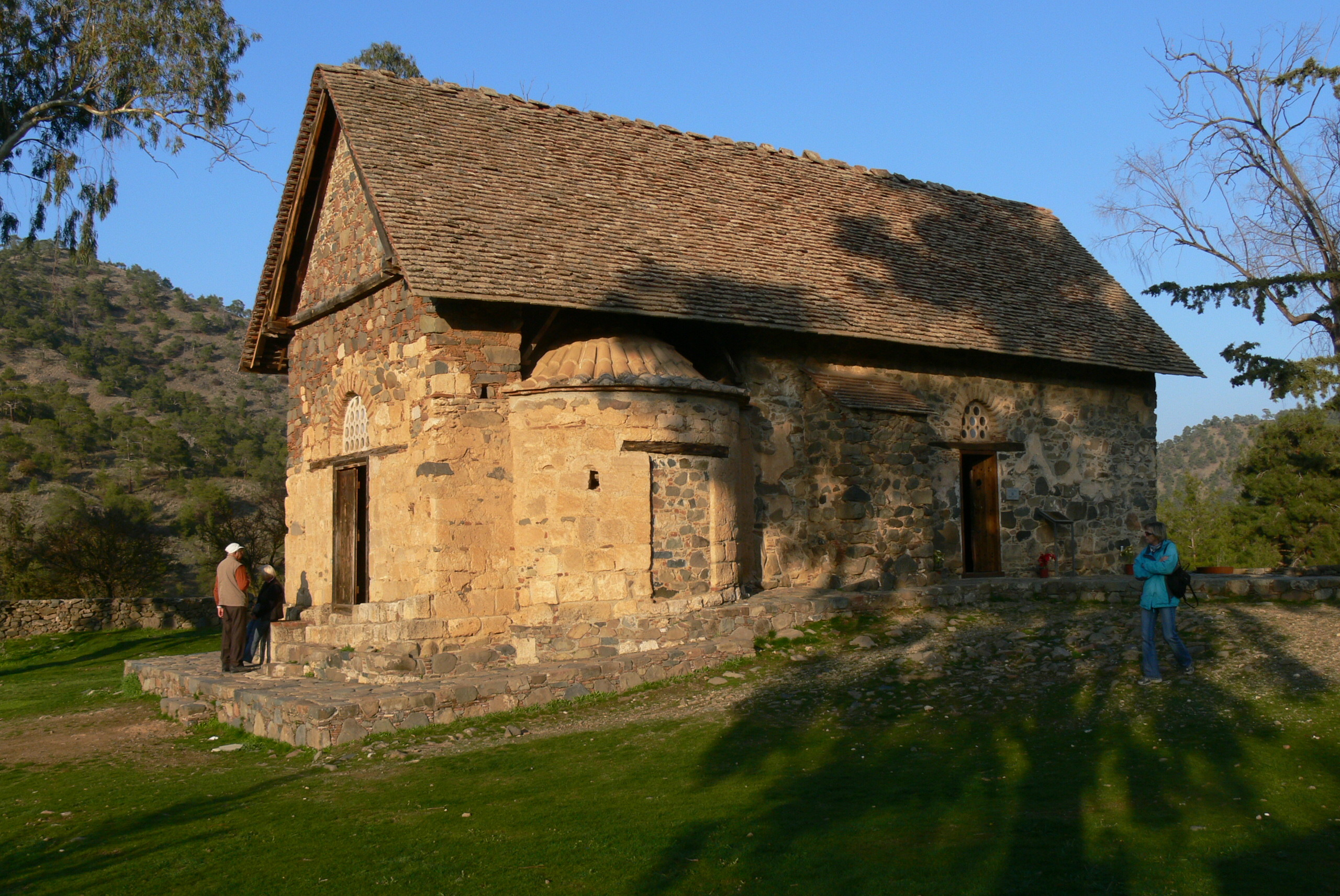
Panagia tis Asinou

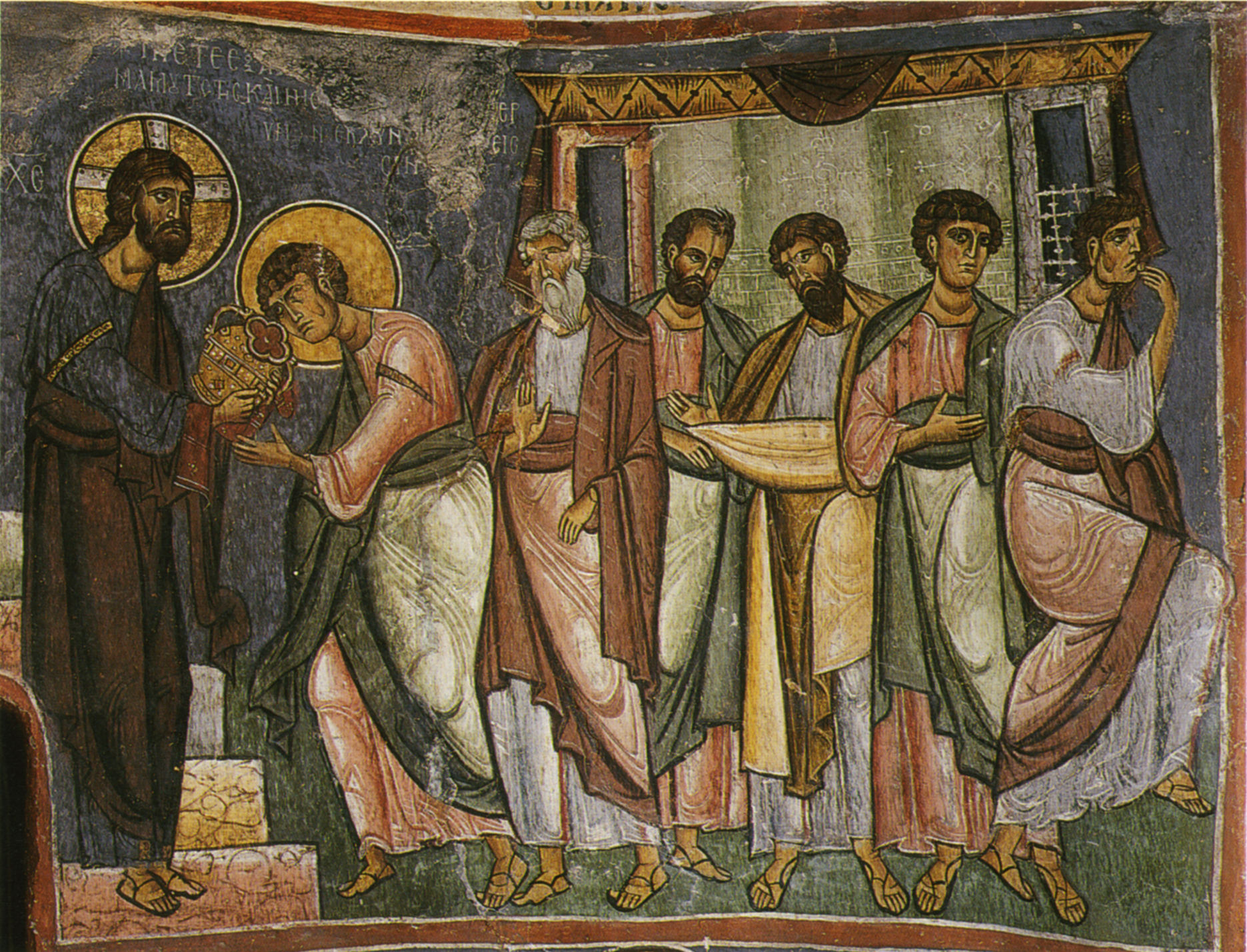

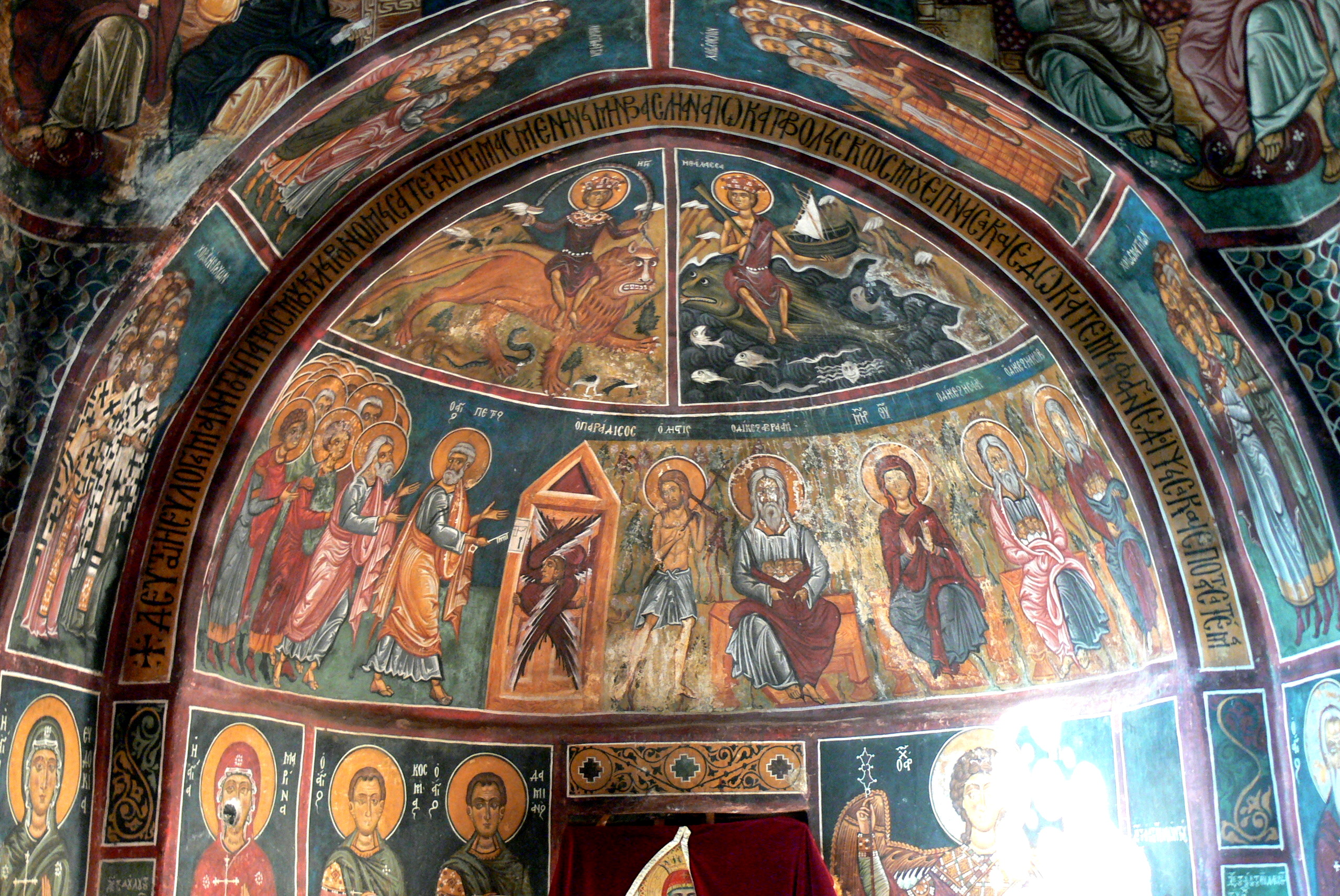

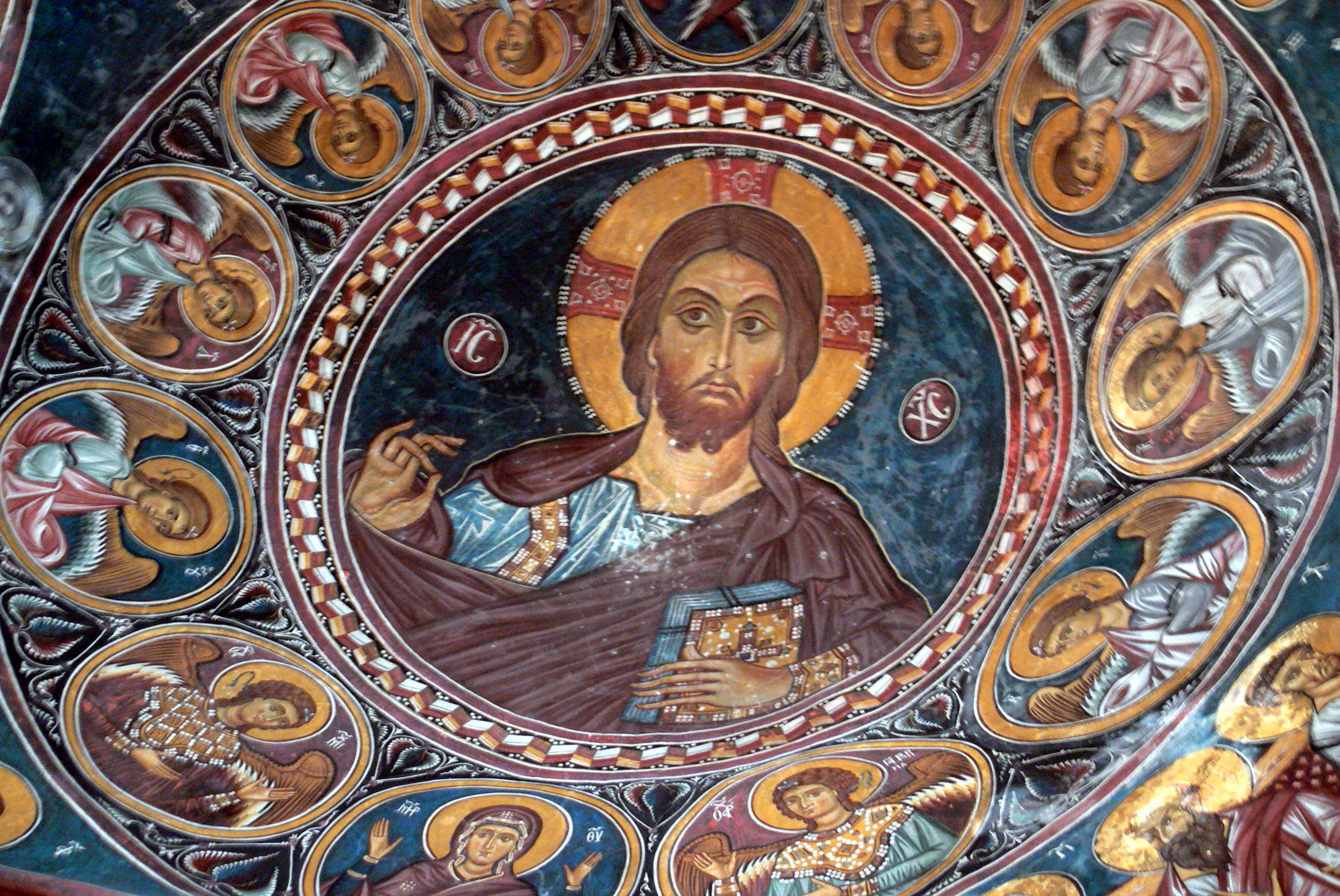

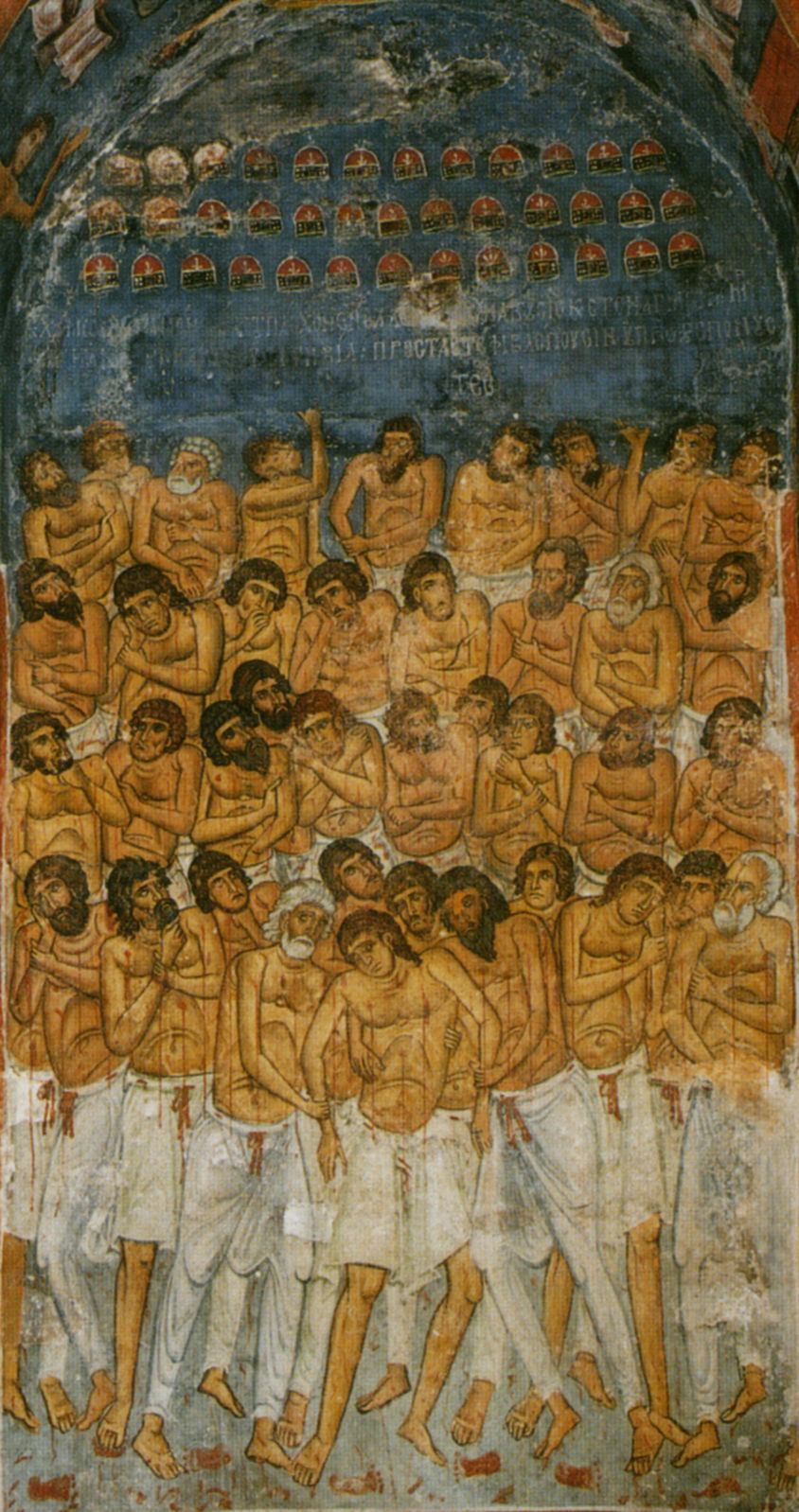
