= Pyrga, Larnaca =

Pyrga
- Village
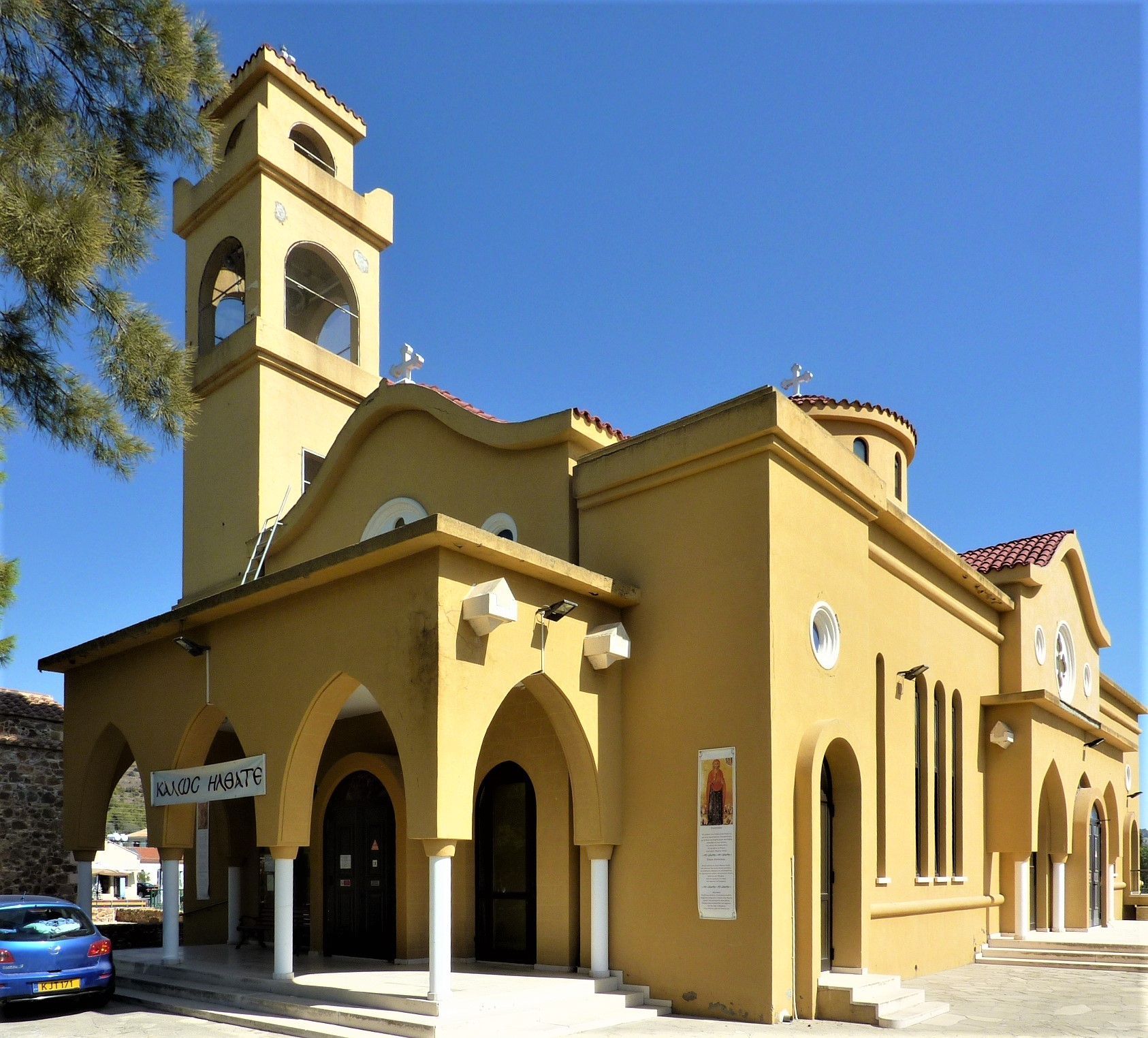
- New church of Agia Marina

- Location in Cyprus
- Coordinates: 34°55′31″N 33°25′59″E
- Country: Cyprus
- District: Larnaca District

Population (2011)
  - Total: 812
- Time zone: UTC+2 (EET)
  - Summer (DST): UTC+3 (EEST)

Pyrga (Greek: Πυργά; Turkish: Çamlıbel) is a village in the Larnaca District of Cyprus, located on 4 km east of Kornos.

The village was built near a medieval building called the Royal Chapel of Pyrgá, or chapel of St Catherine ('Ayia Aikaterini'), at the edge of the village on its eastern side. This ancient chapel has not been used for a long time as a religious building, but it is situated next to the current parochial church of St Mary ('Ayia Marina'), which was constructed in 1992. The ancient chapel is a rare example of a monument constructed in the Lusignan period.

The village also has another church, topped with a cupola, on the southern edge of the village and also named Ayia Marina.

== Climate ==
The climate is Mediterranean, with an average temperature of 22°C. The hottest month is July, averaging 34°C, the coldest January at 11°C. The rainiest month is December, with 112mm of rain, the driest being August with 1mm on average.

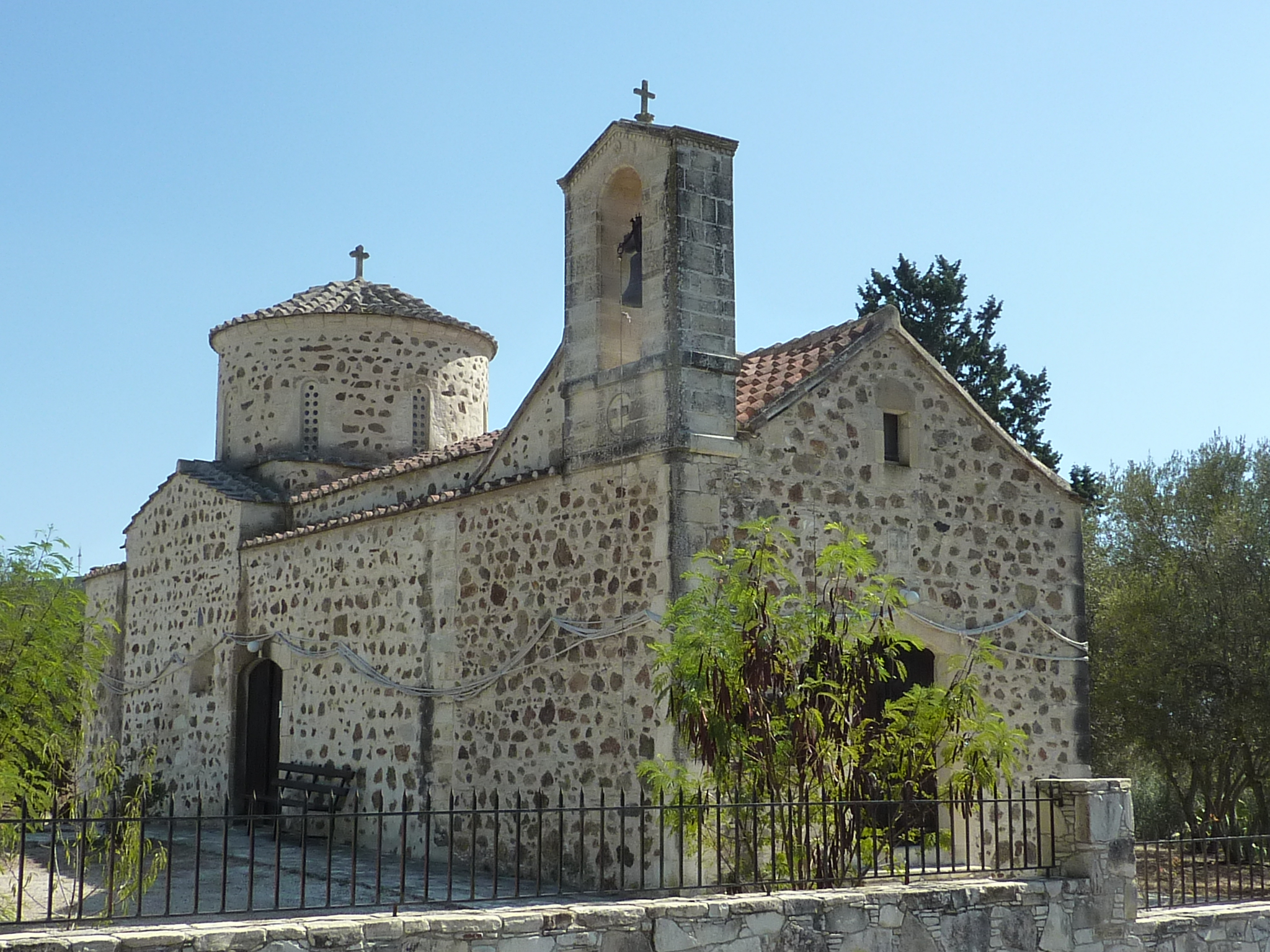
Old church of Agia Marina from 12th century
