= Davydovo =

Davydovo may refer to several settlements in Russia:

== Moscow Oblast ==
- Davydovo, Orekhovo-Zuyevsky District, Moscow Oblast, a village in Russia

== Nizhny Novgorod Oblast ==
- Davydovo, Koverninsky District, Nizhny Novgorod Oblast, a village in Russia
- Davydovo, Vachsky District, Nizhny Novgorod Oblast, a village in Russia

== Tver Oblast ==
- Davydovo, Tver Oblast, a village in Russia

== Vladimir Oblast ==
- Davydovo, Gus-Khrustalny District, Vladimir Oblast
- Davydovo, Kameshkovsky District, Vladimir Oblast

== Vologda Oblast ==
- Davydovo, Babayevsky District, Vologda Oblast
- Davydovo, Cherepovetsky District, Vologda Oblast
- Davydovo, Sheksninsky District, Vologda Oblast
- Davydovo, Vashkinsky District, Vologda Oblast

== See also ==
- Davidovo (disambiguation)
- Davydov (disambiguation)
