= Davydov =

Davydov (Russian: Давыдов), or Davydova (feminine; Давыдова), is a surname common in Russia and Ukraine. In Ukrainian, the spelling is "Давидов/Давидова". The Belarusian variant is Davydau/Davydaw (Давыдаў). Notable people with this surname include.

- Alexander Davydov (disambiguation), multiple persons
- Alexis Dawydoff (1903-1965), Russia-born American socialite, aviator, and aviation journalist
- Alla Davydova (born 1966), Russian hammer thrower
- Daria Davydova (born 1991), Russian judoka
- Denis Davydov (1784–1839), Russian poet and leader in the partisan movement during the Patriotic War
- Ekaterina Davydova (born 1978), Russian ice dancer
- Evgeny Davydov (born 1967), Russian hockey player
- Evgenija Davydova (born 1984), Russian equestrian athlete
- Evgraf Davydov, Russian major-general
- Gyulboor Davydova (1892–1983), Soviet winegrower of Mountain Jewish descent
- Hanna Davydova (born 1998), Ukrainian weightlifter
- Irina Davydova (born 1988), Russian athlete
- Isay Davydov (1927–2020), Russian writer and journalist
- Karl Davydov (1838–1889), Russian cellist, conductor, composer, and pedagogue
- Kyrylo Davydov, (born 1988) Ukrainian footballer
- Lado Davydov (1924–1987), Assyrian Soviet soldier
- Lydia Davydova (1932–2011), Russian soprano and a chamber music performer
- Mikhail Davydov (disambiguation), several people
- Natalya Davydova (born 1985), Ukrainian weightlifter
- Olga Davydova, birth name of Olga Chernyavskaya (born 1963), Russian discus thrower
- Serhiy Davydov, (born 1984) Ukrainian footballer
- Sergei Davydov (writer) (born 1992) Russian writer, playwright
- Stepan Davydov (1777–1825), Russian composer and singer
- Tatyana Davydova (born 2000), Kazakhstani handball player
- Tatiana Davydova (1861–1887), niece of Russian composer Pyotr Ilyich Tchaikovsky
- Vasilisa Davydova (born 1986), Russian tennis player
- Vasily Davydov (1930–1998), Russian psychologist and educationist
- Vitali Davydov (born 1939), Soviet hockey player
- Vladimir Davydov (1871–1906), Russian actor
- Yelena Davydova (born 1961), Soviet gymnast

== See also ==
- Davidov
- Davidoff (disambiguation)
- Davydovo (disambiguation)
