= Davidow =

Davidow is a surname. Notable people with the surname include:

- Jeffrey Davidow (born 1944), American diplomat
- Joie Davidow, American author and editor
- Ruth Davidow (1911–1999), American nurse and political activist

== See also ==
- Davidoff (surname)
- Davidov (disambiguation)
