= Davidoff (surname) =

Davidoff is a surname. Notable people with the surname include:

- Abraham Davidoff, birth name of Al Davis (boxer) (1920–1945), American lightweight and welterweight
- Dimma Davidoff, Russian-American psychologist and game designer, creator of Mafia
- Dov Davidoff (born 1973), American comedian
- Giuliana Davidoff, American mathematician
- Judith Davidoff (1927–2021), American violin and cello player
- Leo M. Davidoff (1898–1975), professor at the Albert Einstein College of Medicine
- Leon Davidoff (born 1962), American politician
- Leonore Davidoff (1932–2014), American feminist historian and sociologist
- Monte Davidoff (born 1956), American computer programmer
- Oded Davidoff (born 1967), Israeli film director
- Paul Davidoff (1930–1984), American urban planner
- Sidney Davidoff (1939–2025), American lawyer
- Zino Davidoff (1906–1994), Ukrainian-born Swiss tobacconist and the founder of the Davidoff cigar brand

== See also ==
- Davidov (disambiguation)
- Davydov
