= Obolensky =

Russian noble family

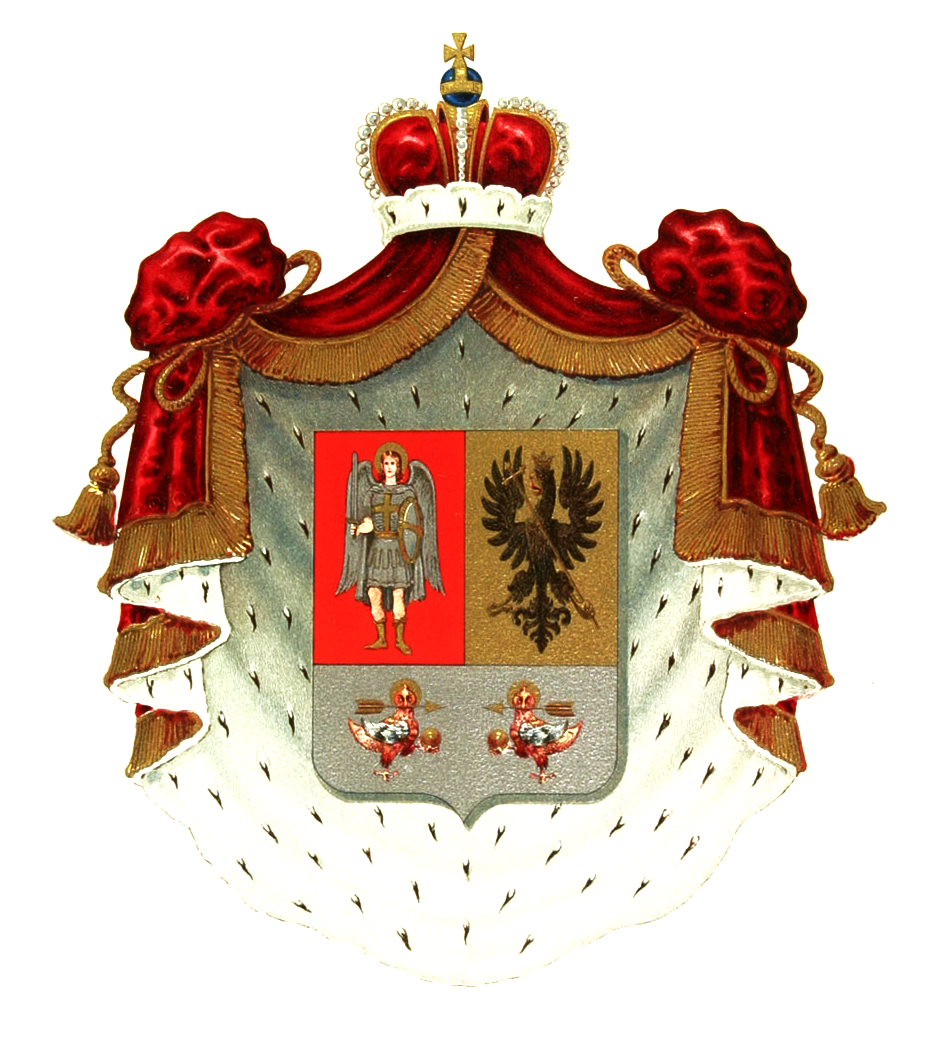
Princely arms of the Obolensky family

The House of Obolensky (Russian: Оболенский, romanized: Obolenskiy) is an ancient Russian princely family, claiming descent from the Olgovichi branch of the Rurik dynasty.

== History ==
Their name derives from the town of Obolensk in the Upper Oka Principalities near Moscow, which was given into the possession to the progenitor of the family, prince Konstantin of Obolensk. Members of the family belonged to the Russian nobility and held the hereditary title of Knyaz in the Empire of Russia. The Obolensky coat of arms is composed of the emblems of the principalities of Kiev and Chernigov.

== Notable members ==
- Ivan Mikhailovich "Repnya" Obolensky (d.1523), ancestor of the House of Repnin
- Alexey Obolensky (1819–1884), Russian artillery general
- Ivan Mikhailovich Obolensky (1853–1910), Governor-General of Finland
- Alexey Dmitrievich Obolensky (24 November/6 December 1855-21 September 1933)-Russian statesman, equerry, Chief Prosecutor of the Holy Synod (1905—1906)

After the Russian Revolution, part of the Obolensky family went into exile and their descendants carry "Obolensky" as a regular surname.

- Alexander Sergeevich Obolensky (b. 1916, d. 1940 in Suffolk), was a Russian prince and went on to represent England in international Rugby Union. He was popularly known as "The Flying Prince" or simply as "Obo"
- Alexis Alekseevich Obolensky (1915–1986), socialite and "father of modern backgammon"
- Alexis Dawydoff (1903 - 1965), socialite and aviator, son of Princess Marie Obolensky.
- Dimitri Alexandrovich Obolensky (1882–1964), son of Prince Alexander Dimitrievich Obolensky (1847–1917), after the revolution became a night watchman and a taxi driver in Paris
- Dimitri Dmitriyevich Obolensky (1918–2001), historian, son of Dmitri Alexandrovich Obolensky (1882–1964) and Countess Maria Shuvalov (1894–1973)
- Ivan Sergeyevich Obolensky (1925–2019), son of Sergei Platonovich "Serge" Obolensky and Ava Alice Muriel Astor
- Serge Obolensky (1890–1978), Sergei Platonovich "Serge" Obolensky (born at Tsarskoye Selo), was a Russian Prince; 1st husband of Ava Alice Muriel Astor (1902–1956) (daughter of John Jacob Astor IV (1864–1912) of the Astor family and Ava Lowle Willing (1868–1958)), and son of Platon Sergeyevich Obolensky and Marie Narishkin, he was Vice Chairman of the Board of Hilton Hotels Corporation. His first wife was a daughter of Emperor Alexander II of Russia
- Sergey Nikolaievich Obolensky (1909–1992), son of Nikolai Leonidovich Obolensky
