= Sergei Davydov =

Sergei Davydov may refer to:

- Sergei Davydov (figure skater) (born 1979), Belarusian figure skater
- Sergei Davydov (footballer, born 1979) Russian footballer
- Serhiy Davydov (born 1984), Ukrainian footballer
- Sergei Davydov (footballer, born 1985), Russian footballer
- Sergei Davydov (writer), born 1992) Russian writer, playwright

== See also ==
- Davydov (surname)
