= Davidovac =

Davidovac may refer to:

- Davidovac Airport or Paraćin Airport, a civil airport near the town of Paraćin, Serbia
- Davidovac, Kladovo, a village in the Kladovo municipality of Bor District, Serbia
- Davidovac, Vranje, a village in the Vranje municipality of Pčinja District, Serbia
- Davidovac, Paraćin, a village in the Paraćin municipality, Serbia
- Davidovac, Svrljig, a village in the Svrljig municipality, Serbia

== See also ==
- Davidovo (disambiguation), a toponym in Bulgaria and Republic of Macedonia
- Davidovica, a village in the Gornji Milanovac municipality, Serbia
- Davidovica monastery, a monastery in the Brodarevo municipality, Serbia
- Davidovce, a village in the Štimlje municipality, Kosovo
