= Prince Obolensky =

Prince Obolensky may refer to:

- Prince Alexander Sergeevich Obolensky (1916–1940), son of Serge Obolensky and Princess Luba and England rugby union international
- Prince Dimitri Alexandrovich Obolensky (1882–1964), Russian landowner
- Prince Dimitri Obolensky (1918–2001), son of Prince Dimitri Alexandrovich Obolensky (1882–1964) and Countess Maria Shuvalov (1894–1973)
- Prince Ivan Mikhailovich Obolensky (1853–1910), Governor-General of Finland
- Prince Michael Alexander Obolensky, American pretender
- Prince Serge Obolensky (1890–1978), husband of Ava Alice Muriel Astor, and son of Platon Obolensky and Marie Narishkin
