= Davidoff (disambiguation) =

Davidoff is a Swiss tobacco brand.

Davidoff may also refer to:

- Zino Davidoff Group, a Swiss luxury goods brand
- Davidoff (surname)

== See also ==
- Davidoff Swiss Indoors
- Davidov (disambiguation)
- Davydov
