= David Winfield =

David Winfield may refer to:

- Dave Winfield (born 1951), American baseball player
- Dave Winfield (footballer) (born 1988), English footballer
- David Winfield (conservator) (1929–2013), British conservator and Byzantinist
