= Alexis Obolensky =

American backgammon player (1915–1986)

Prince Alexis Obolensky
- Born: April 20, 1915; St. Petersburg, Russia
- Died: February 8, 1986 (aged 70); Manhattan, NYC, U.S.
- Education: University of Virginia (JD)
- Occupations: Socialite & backgammon player Realtor
- Spouse(s): Jane Wheeler Irby (m. 1939; div. 1952) Katherine Taylor Gennett (m. 1952; div. 1965) Jacqueline Ann Stedman (m. 1965; div. 1971)
- Family: Obolensky family

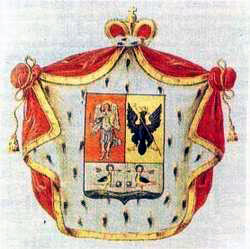
Obolensky coat of arms

Prince Alexis Obolensky (April 20, 1915 – February 8, 1986) was an aristocratic Russian-American socialite, real estate broker and celebrated backgammon player, dubbed the "Father of Modern Backgammon".

A member of the house of Obolensky, part of the Russian nobility, his family descends from the ancient Rurik dynasty.

== Early life ==
Born in 1915 at Saint Petersburg under Tsarist rule, he was the only son of Prince Alexey Alexandrovitch Obolensky (1883–1942) and Lubov Petrovna "Luba" née Trubetskaya (1888–1980), Russian emigrés who later settled in New York City.

Of his four sisters, the eldest was Princess Alexandra Obolenskaya (1909–1997) who married firstly Prince Nikolai Troubetzkoy (div. 1933) and secondly Artemi Wachramejev (div. 1947) then Anatol Nicholas Sazonoff (1896–1991). His other surviving elder sister was Princess Luba Troubetzkoy (1912–1991) of Sea Cliff on Long Island, and his younger sister, Princess Daria (1915–1995), married David Bradley Morgan Jr (1912–1994).

He counted among his cousins U.S. Army Colonel Prince Serge Obolensky, rugby player Prince Alexander Obolensky, and the historian Dimitri Obolensky.

His family fled Moscow during the Russian Revolution in 1917, first to Istanbul and then to France, before emigrating to the United States where they settled in the 1930s.

Prince Alexis later attended the Kent School in Kent, Connecticut, before reading law at the University of Virginia (graduating JD), where he became a member of the Virginia Glee Club and Zeta Psi.

== Career ==
Obolensky worked as a real estate broker in Florida's Palm Beach area, where he maintained a home.

During the 1960s and 1970s, he traveled widely promoting backgammon both as a gambling and tournament game. He co-founded the World Backgammon Club, an organization in Manhattan that sponsors international tournaments, serving as its president until his death.

== Personal life ==
On January 6, 1939, at Manassas, Virginia, Obolensky married Jane Wheeler Irby (1914–1981), an alumna of Fermata School, Aiken, and the daughter of Robert Garland Irby. Finally divorced in April 1952, they were parents of three children:

- Princess Anne Obolensky (Dec 12, 1939– Sept 10, 2023), who was married 3 times: Pedro Antonio Piedra Buena O’Sullivan (b. 1928); Christopher Czaja Sager (b.1942) and Robin Owens (b. 1950).
- Prince Alexis Obolensky Jr. (Nov 10, 1944–Oct 23, 1999);
- Princess Mary Obolensky (1946–1986), who married Anthony Underwood (1949–1981).

Prince Alexis married secondly in New York City on November 22, 1952, Katherine Taylor "Kappy" (née Pearce) Gennett (1919–1998), the former wife of Carter Tate Gennett and daughter of J. McAllister Pearce. His first wife, Princess Jane Irby Obolensky, then married Harold Hegeler Lihme in November 1953. They also divorced and in 1965, he married thirdly Jacqueline Ann Stedman (1939–2002).

Obolensky died at home in Manhattan on February 8, 1986.

=== Legacy ===
In 2018, Prince Alexis Obolensky was inducted into the Backgammon Hall of Fame.

== Published works ==
- Obolensky, Alexis (with Ted James): Backgammon: The Action Game, Collier Books, 1969, ISBN 9780020810308
