= Panagia tou Araka =

Byzantine church in Cyprus

Coordinates: 34°57′55.64″N 33°0′25.70″E

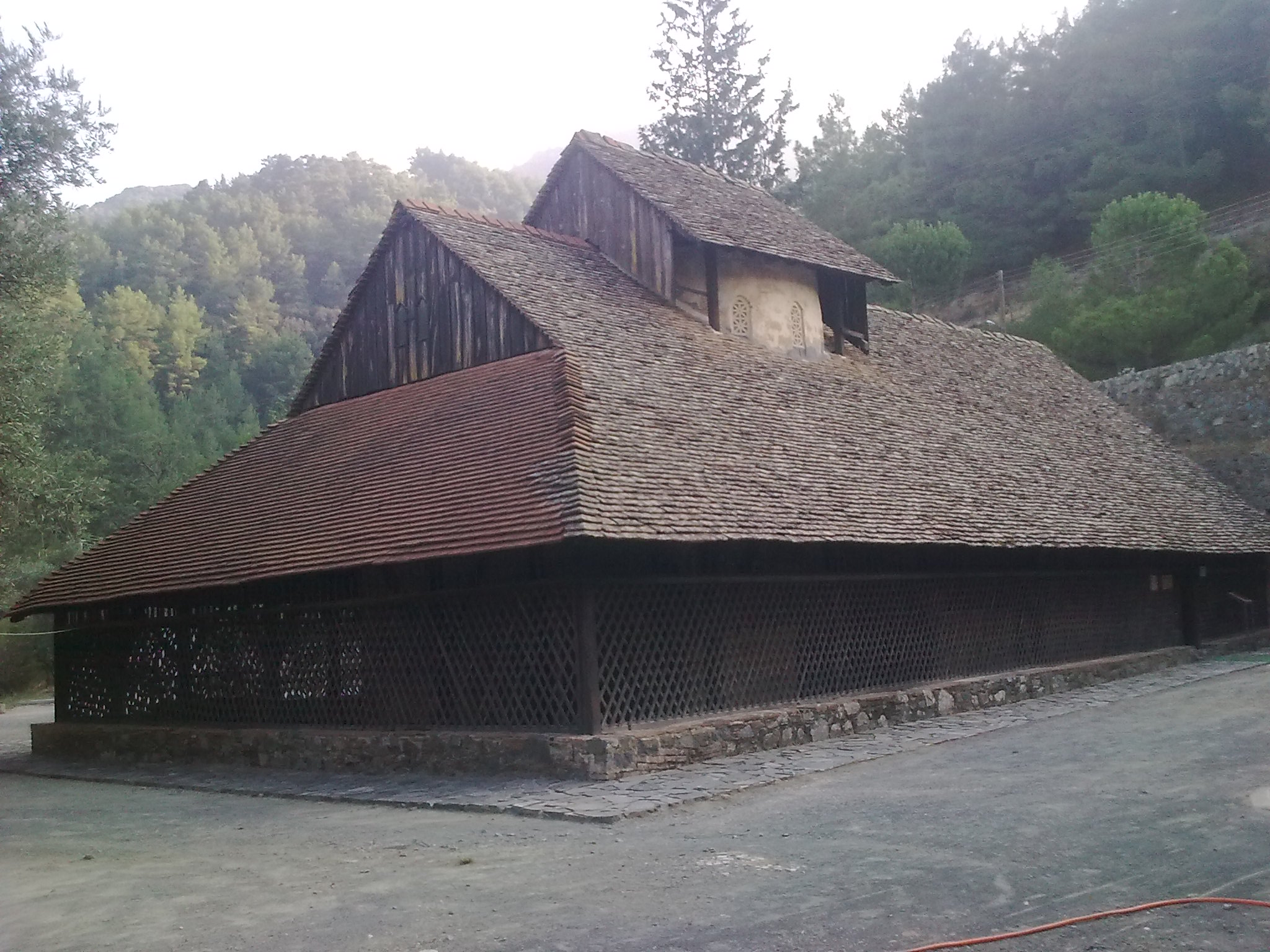
Panagia Tou Araka

The Panagia tou Araka, or Arakos (Greek: Παναγία του Άρακα or Άρακος), is a middle Byzantine Orthodox church located in Cyprus. It is one of the most well-known and completely preserved middle Byzantine churches with mural paintings. The church is one of the ten Painted Churches in the Troödos Region, which was listed as an UNESCO World Heritage Site in 1985 because of its importance to the history of Byzantine rule in Cyprus.

== History ==
The church is located by the village of Lagoudera, Cyprus. Similar to other churches in the area, this church was named after a wildflower, the vetch. It was built atop the northeast slopes of Madari, the second highest summit of the Troodos Mountains. The date and circumstances of the church's consecration remain uncertain, but with its location between the villages of Lagoudera and Sarandi, it is postulated that the church was privately owned or that it was a monastery as it was situated away from the villages.

Most of the church's history is recorded within its mural paintings. The inscription on the interior of the north lintel states that they were completed in December 1192 and were painted by a monk named Theodore Apsevdis. Apsevdis had been trained in Constantinople and his work may have been commissioned by the Byzantine aristocrat Leontios Authentes, seeking refuge at a nearby monastery built by his father. Around the 14th century, the mural paintings were restored due to water damage and the inscription for these restorations was signed by a deacon named Leontios.

== Mural Paintings ==
=== Virgin of the Passion ===
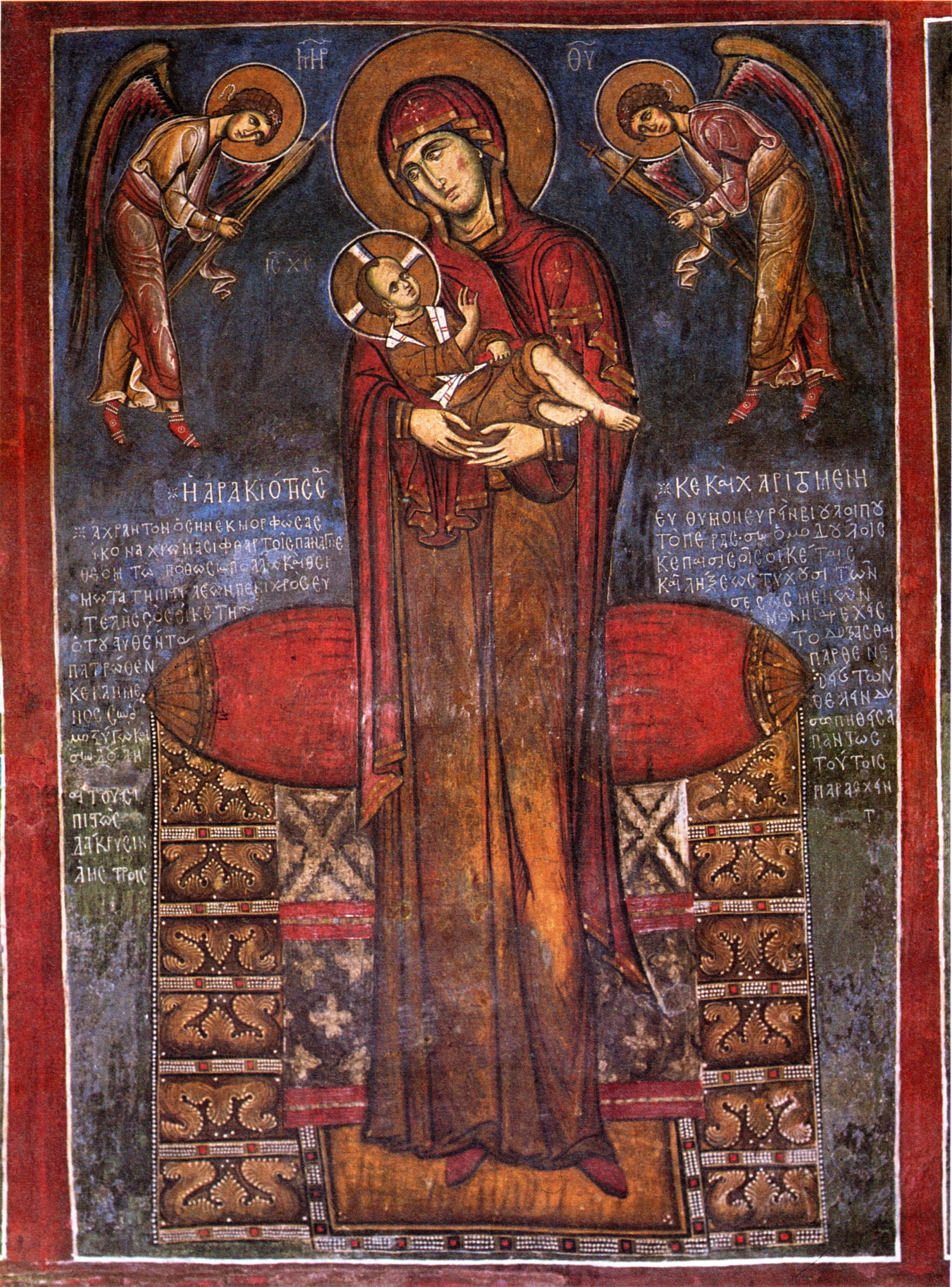
The Panagia Arakiotissa

This mural is located on the southeastern wall of the church. It was the first of its kind in the Komnenian-period, during the reign of Alexios I Komnenos (r. 1081–1118), and it was painted in 1192 under the patronage of Leontios Authentes by Theodore Apsevdis. Imagery of the Virgin has always been associated with political strength within the Byzantine Empire; however, this particular painting does not hold the same symbolic meaning. Just prior to its conception, the island of Cyprus went through bouts of battles and changes in leadership. This period of turmoil and chaos is reflected in the image depicting the Virgin of the Passion. As stated by the historian Sophocleous:

"The donor's grief is perceived through the transformation of the Virgin's image which he prescribes."

This grief is presented in a way that differs from the other depictions of the Virgin of the Passion. This painting depicts Mary in full length, standing in front of her throne, holding the Christ child, as opposed to other depictions of her from the shoulders up. Additionally, the angels bearing the spear and the cross (a reference to Christ's future) are as large as Jesus, whereas in other versions of this icon the angels are small and ancillary within the composition. This emphasis on the angels carrying symbols of Christ's passion and the depiction of the Virgin standing holding her child could be interpreted as the Virgin offering her child to his fate, just as she is offering up the island of Cyprus to many of its volatile leaders. Accompanying the painting is an elaborate prayer to the Virgin which also helps indicate the patron for this particular mural painting.

"All-pure mother of God, he who has portrayed
your immaculate image in perishable colors
with great yearning and most ardent faith,
Leon, your poor and worthless servant,
called after his father Authentes,
together with his consort and fellow servant [name of wife] request faithfully with countless tears
to find a happy conclusion to the rest of their life
together with their fellow slaves and children, your servants, and receive the death of the saved.
For you alone, Virgin, are able to be glorified.
When entreated to provide people with"

=== Saint Simeon and Saint John the Baptist ===
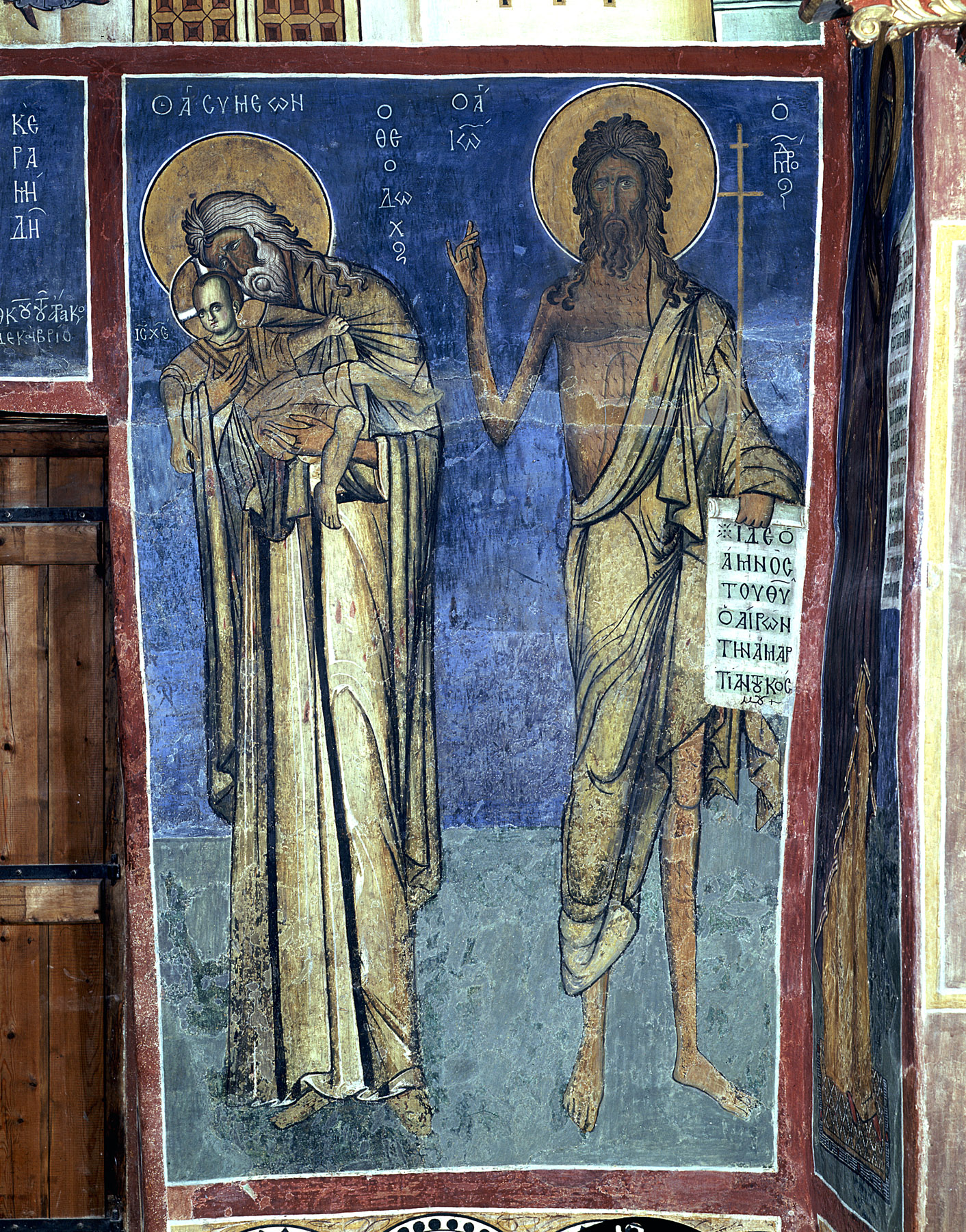
North wall, east of door, St. Simeon holding Christ Child and St. John the Baptist

Across from the Virgin of Passion is the mural painting of Saint Simeon, holding the Christ child with Saint John the Baptist standing next to him. The placement of this painting represents the Presentation in the Temple scene in the New Testament. According to Luke 2:22-29, the elder Symeon rushed to see the Christ child as it was prophesied that he would not die until he saw the "Anointed of the Lord." Additionally, the presence of St. John the Baptist carries significant meaning in suggesting the fate of Christ and his sacrifice. This foreshadowing of Christ's future is written in the scroll held by St. John the Baptist stating:

"Behold the Lamb of God who takes away the sins of the world."

Also, the positioning of this painting could refer to the purification rituals that were performed on the Virgin as it was customary for mothers to be purified in a temple forty days after the birth of a firstborn son.

== Preservation and conservation ==
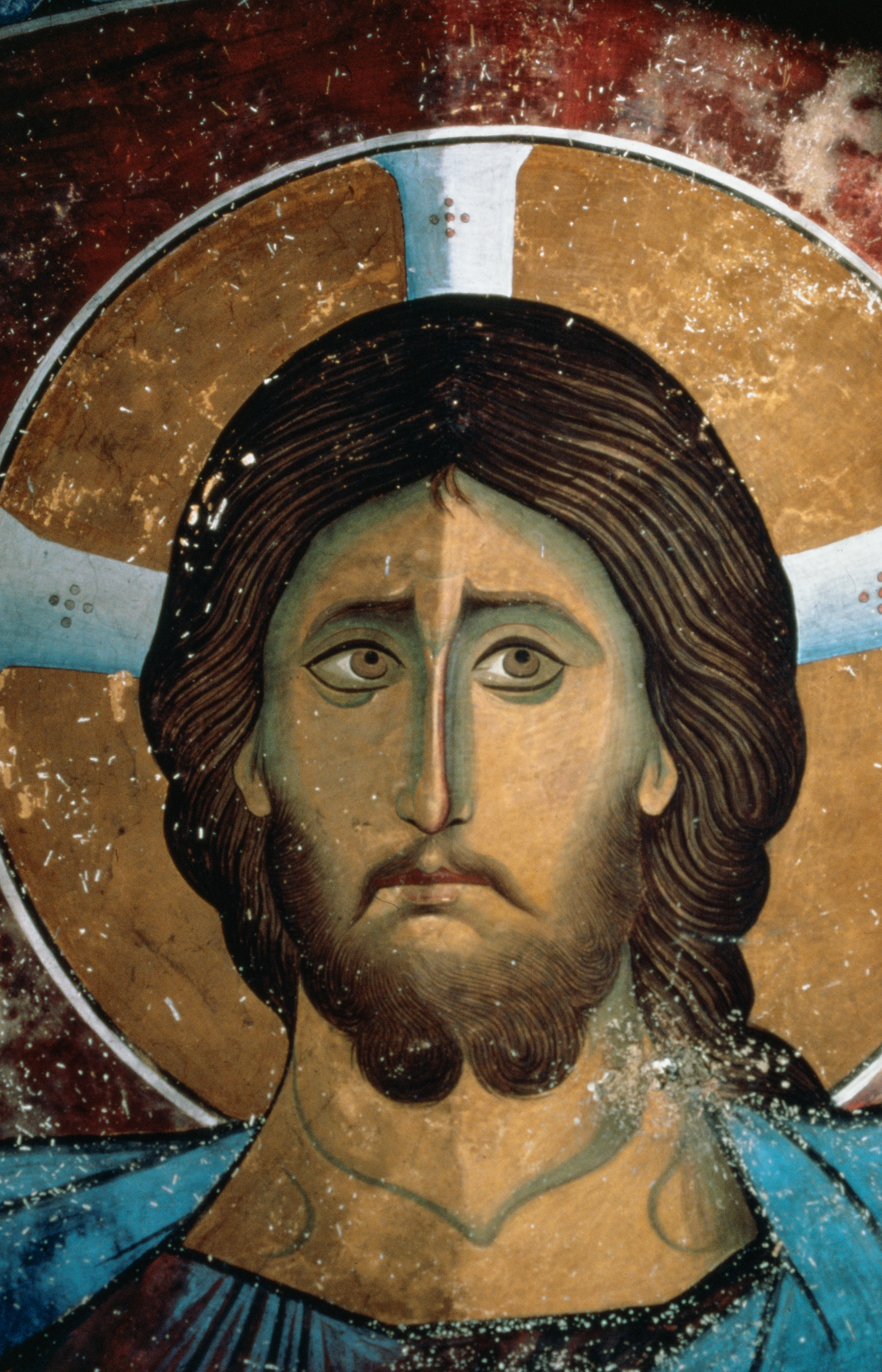
Detail of Christ Pantocrator, half cleaned. Photo by David Winfield

The preservation of the mural paintings within this church was sponsored by Dumbarton Oaks Research Center and Collection. David Winfield oversaw the restoration and conservation project from 1968 until 1973 together with his wife, June, who analyzed the images and made drawings. Within those years, the Winfields wrote detailed reports of their process in restoring the mural paintings for Dumbarton Oaks. In these reports, they describe such things as the differences in brushwork and usage of colors between Theodore Apsevdis and the deacon Leontios. They also made note of the materials used (ultramarine, vermilion, gold leaf and silver) that could be found locally in the valley. The Winfields later published a significant book on their work, The Church of the Panaghia tou Arakos at Lagoudhera, Cyprus: The Paintings and Their Painterly Significance, in 2003.

== See also ==
Explore the Church of Panagia tou Araka in 3D. The IHAT Platform
