= Anthony Bryer =

British historian (1937–2016)

Anthony Bryer OBE, FSA, FRHistS
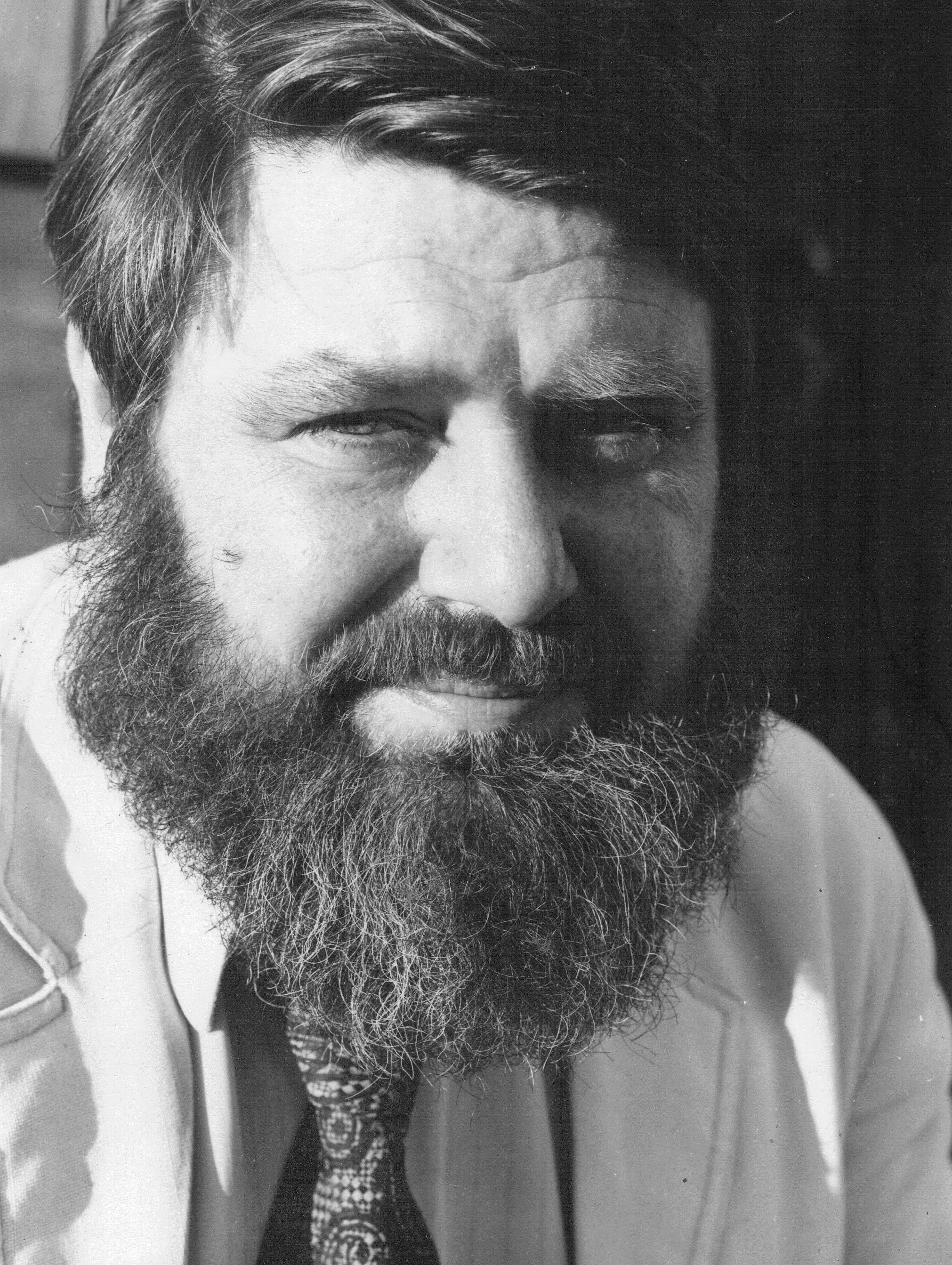
- Born: 31 October 1937; Southsea
- Died: 22 October 2016 (aged 78)
- Children: Theodora Bryer, Anna Bryer and Katie Bryer
- Awards: OBE

Academic background
- Education: Balliol College, Oxford
- Alma mater: University of Oxford
- Thesis: The society and institutions of the Empire of Trebizond (1967)
- Doctoral advisor: Dimitri Obolensky

Academic work
- Discipline: Byzantine studies
- Institutions: University of Birmingham (1964–1999)
- Doctoral students: John Haldon, Judith Herrin, Margaret Mullett
- Notable works: The Byzantine Monuments and Topography of the Pontos

Anthony Applemore Mornington Bryer OBE, FSA, FRHistS (31 October 1937 – 22 October 2016) was a British historian of the Byzantine Empire who founded the journal Byzantine and Modern Greek Studies and the Centre for Byzantine, Ottoman and Modern Greek Studies at the University of Birmingham.

== Biographical details ==
Anthony Bryer was born on 31 October 1937 in Southsea, Portsmouth. He was the son of Group Captain Gerald Bryer OBE and Joan Bryer (née Grigsby), a Special Operations Executive employee. Part of his childhood was spent in Jerusalem where he was first acquainted with Sir Steven Runciman, historian and Byzantine scholar.

In 1961 he married Elizabeth Lipscomb, a fellow Oxford student; they had three daughters. She died in 1995 and Bryer married Jennifer Ann Banks, a fellow Birmingham academic, in 1998.

Bryer died on 22 October 2016.

== Education and career ==
Bryer was educated at Copthorne Preparatory School (1945–51) and Canford School (1951–55), and after completing his National Service he studied history at Balliol College, Oxford (BA 1958–61). He remained at Balliol as a Newman Scholar until 1964 while preparing his doctorate on the Empire of Trebizond, which he completed in 1967. From 1964 he was Research Fellow and from 1965 Lecturer in Medieval History at the University of Birmingham, where he created a programme in Byzantine studies. He founded the journal Byzantine and Modern Greek Studies in 1975, and the Centre for Byzantine Studies in 1976 (serving as its first director until 1994). He was promoted to Senior Lecturer in 1973, Reader in Byzantine Studies in 1977, and finally in 1980 appointed Professor of Byzantine Studies, a post which he held until his retirement in 1999. In a distinguished career he has held fellowships at Athens University, Dumbarton Oaks and Merton College, Oxford. He was Public Orator of the University of Birmingham from 1991 to 1999.

== Photography ==
A number of photographs attributed to Bryer appear in the Conway Library at the Courtauld Institute of Art, London. This collection includes architectural images, religious and secular, across many countries and is in the process of being digitised as part of the Courtauld Connects project.

== Awards and honours ==
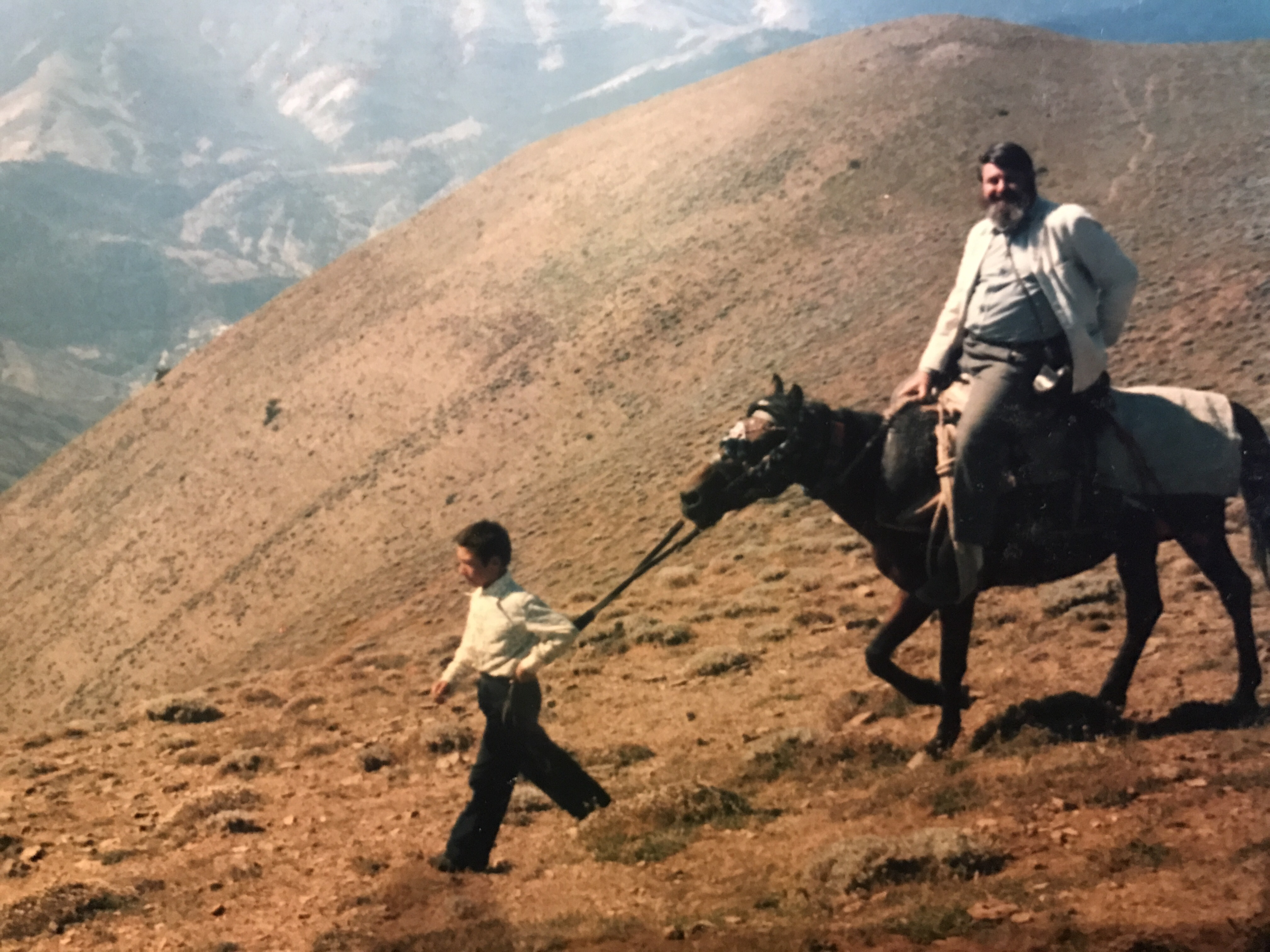
Anthony Bryer on a mule in Turkey

Bryer was awarded an OBE in the 2009 New Year Honours for services to scholarship.

He was elected a Fellow of the Society of Antiquaries of London in 1973.

== Publications ==
Bryer's contribution to the study of the Byzantine world includes the following:

- The Empire of Trebizond and the Pontos, London: Variorum, 1988
- (with David Winfield) The Byzantine Monuments and Topography of the Pontos, 2 vols., Washington, DC: Dumbarton Oaks Research Library and Collections, 1985
- (with Heath W. Lowry) Continuity and Change in Late Byzantine and Early Ottoman Society, Birmingham: University of Birmingham, 1986
- Peoples and Settlement in Anatolia and the Caucasus, 800–1900, London: Variorum, 1988
- (editor, with Mary Cunningham), Mount Athos and Byzantine Monasticism: Papers from the 25th Symposium of Byzantine Studies, Birmingham, 1994
- (with Jane Isaac, David Winfield and Selina Ballance) The Post-Byzantine Monuments of the Pontos: A Source Book, Aldershot: Ashgate, 2002
