= Sergey Nefedov =

Russian historian

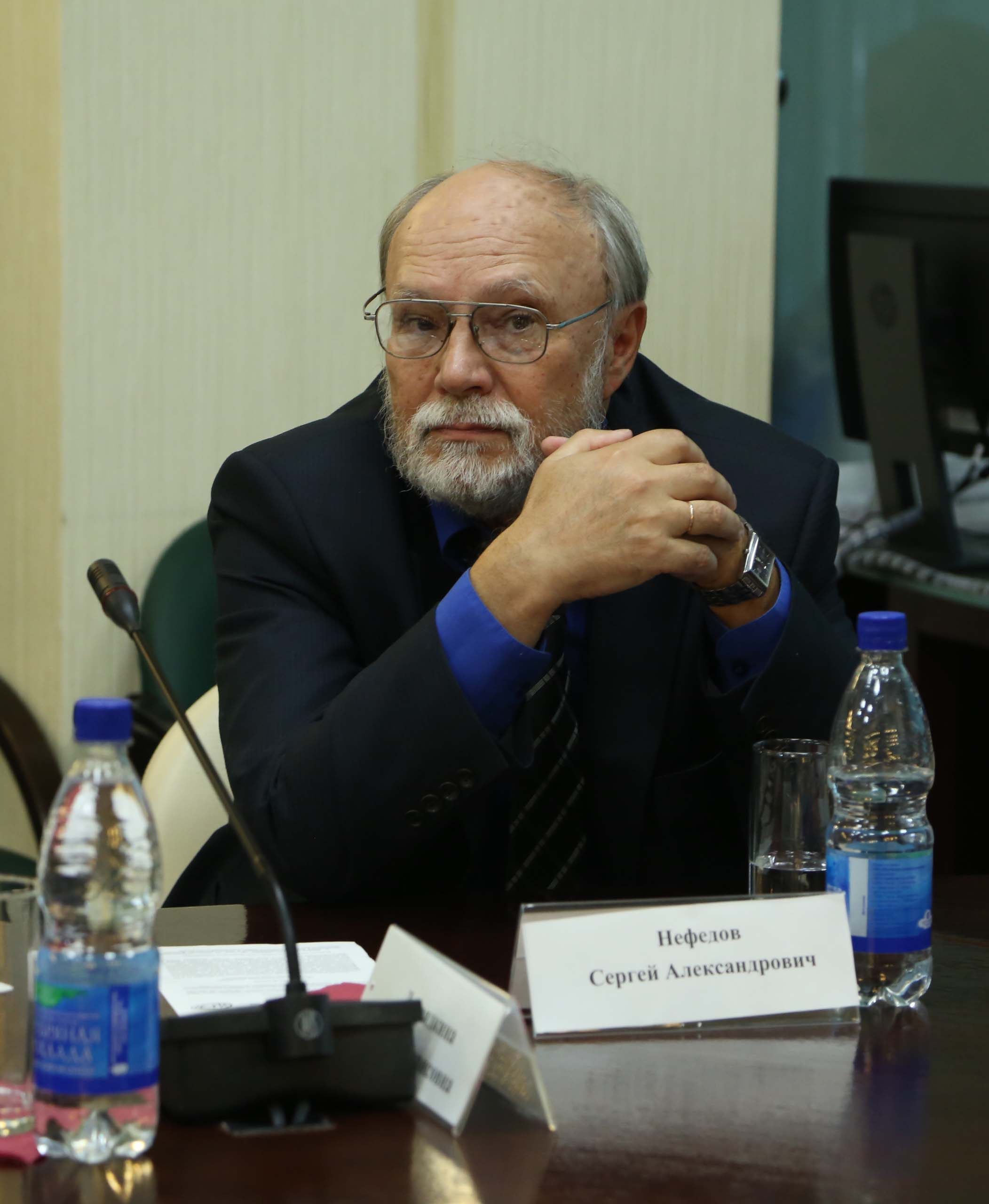
- Born: 4 November 1951; Yekaterinburg
- Education: Ural State University
- Occupation: Historian
- Employer: Institute of History and Archaeology
- Website: histbook.ru

Sergey Aleksandrovich Nefedov (Russian: Сергей Александрович Нефёдов; born November 4, 1951) is a Russian historian, Doctor of Sciences in Historical Sciences (2007), Candidate of Sciences in physico-mathematical sciences (1981), leading researcher at the Institute of History and Archaeology of the Ural branch of the Russian Academy of Sciences. He also is a professor at the Ural Federal University.

In 1968 he entered and in 1973 he graduated from the Ural State University, Mathematics and Mechanics Faculty. From 1973 to 1975, he was a graduate student at Ural State University. He was a student of Nikolay Krasovsky.

He has twice received 'Public Thought Award' (2008, 2011). He also received the Academician Rychkov Award (2011). He is a Novy Mir magazine award winner (2016).

Author of more than 300 publications, including several monographs. He published in Voprosy Istorii, Russian History, Herald of the Russian Academy of Sciences, Voprosy Ekonomiki, Social Evolution & History, Economics & Sociology.

He is co-author (with Peter Turchin) of “Secular Cycles” (Princeton University Press, 2009), reviewed by William R. Thompson, Laura Panza, and Brian J. L. Berry.

He is a regular contributor to the magazine Novy Mir.

He's into snorkeling.

== List of Monographs published ==
- История Российской империи. Факторный анализ [History of the Russian Empire. Factor Analysis] (in Russian). 2024. ISBN 978-9939-9320-6-4.
- Уровень жизни населения и аграрное развитие России в 1900-1940 годах [Standard of living of the population and agricultural development of Russia in 1900-1940] (in Russian). 2020. ISBN 978-5-85006-177-7.
- Факторный анализ исторического процесса. Исторический опыт традиционных обществ Востока [Factor analysis of the historical process. Historical experience of traditional societies of the East] (in Russian). 2019. ISBN 978-5-8291-2290-4.
- Аграрные и демографические итоги сталинской коллективизации [Agrarian and demographic results of Stalin's collectivization] (in Russian). 2013. ISBN 978-5-89016-883-2.
- История России. Том 1. С древнейших времен до Великой Смуты [History of Russia. Volume 1. From Ancient Times to the Great Troubles] (in Russian). 2010. ISBN 978-5-911290-75-7.
- История России. Факторный анализ. Том 2. От окончания Смуты до Февральской революции [History of Russia. Factor analysis. Volume 2. From the end of the Time of Troubles to the February Revolution] (in Russian). 2011. ISBN 978-5-91129-064-1.
- Война и общество. Факторный анализ исторического процесса [War and Society. Factor Analysis of the Historical Process] (in Russian). 2008. ISBN 5-91129-026-X.
- Экополитология. Политология в контексте экологических проблем [Ecopolitical science. Political science in the context of environmental issues] (in Russian). 2008. ISBN 978-5-384-00101-0.
- Коммуникативная модальность и эпистемические модальные компоненты в немецком языке (синхрония и диахрония) [Communicative modality and epistemic modal components in German (synchrony and diachrony)] (in Russian). 2010. ISBN 978-5-288-04558-5.
- Информационно-измерительная техника и электроника. Учебник [Information and measuring equipment and electronics. Textbook] (in Russian). 2007. ISBN 978-5-7695-4535-1.
- История и математика. Альманах. Макроисторическая динамика общества и государства [History and Mathematics. Almanac. Macrohistorical dynamics of society and state] (in Russian). 2007. ISBN 978-5-484-00978-7.
- История Средних веков [History of the Middle Ages] (in Russian). 1996. ISBN 5-691-00020-9.
- История нового времени. Эпоха Возрождения [History of modern times. Renaissance] (in Russian). 1996. ISBN 5-87065-077-1.
- История древнего мира [History of the ancient world] (in Russian). 1996. ISBN 5-691-00017-9.
- История Поднебесной [History of the Celestial Empire] (in Russian). 1992. ISBN 5-7525-0254-3.

== Criticism ==
Historians, including Mikhail Davydov and Boris Mironov, have engaged in polemics against Nefedov’s methodical evaluations of the standard of living in the Russian Empire, claiming that the standard of living was much higher in the Russian empire and that it was in fact not a cause of the Russian revolutions of 1917.
