= Sergey Obolensky =

Russian priest

Sergey Nikolaievich Obolensky (15 December 1909, Pirogovo, Tula province, Russian Empire – November 9, 1992, Belgium) was a Russian priest of the Russian Catholic Church of the Byzantine rite, Ph.D, member of the Russian apostolate and activist of the Russian diaspora.

== Biography ==
Born in 1909 in the family of Orthodox princes Obolensky, from 1925 in exile in France, where, together with his father Nikolai Leonidovich Obolensky adopted Catholicism. He went to the Benedictines, where studied philosophy, and in 1943 he defended his doctoral degree from Pontifical Atheneum of St. Anselm in Rome. From 1935 he studied at Russicum. Ordained priest in 1940, Obolensky was sent to Paris, where he taught at Saint George Boarding in Meudon. He was also a member of the Congress of Russian Catholics in 1950 in Rome. Obolensky taught courses on the history of Russian literature and philosophy in Rome, Meudon and Bergamo. He worked as an expert on the Soviet Union in NATO. He was also author of books on the Soviet economy, translated the correspondence of Joseph Stalin, Franklin Roosevelt and Winston Churchill, and the memoirs of Georgy Zhukov and was engaged in the Soviet dissident literature. He died in 1992 in Belgium, the home of his sister.
