= Alexander Davydov =

Alexander Davydov or Aleksandr Davydov may refer to:

- Aleksandr Davydov (animator) (1937–2012), Soviet and Russian animator
- Aleksandr Davydov (footballer)
- Alexander Davydov (physicist), Soviet and Ukrainian physicist
- Alexander Davydov (singer) (1872–1944), Russian and Soviet opera singer
- Alexander Davydov (soldier), Soviet Red Army major and an illegitimate child of Joseph Stalin
- Alexander Lvovich Davydov (1773–1833), Russian Imperial major-general

== See also ==
- Aleksandar Davidov, Serbian footballer
