= Nikolai Leonidovich Obolensky =

Russian governor (1878–1960)

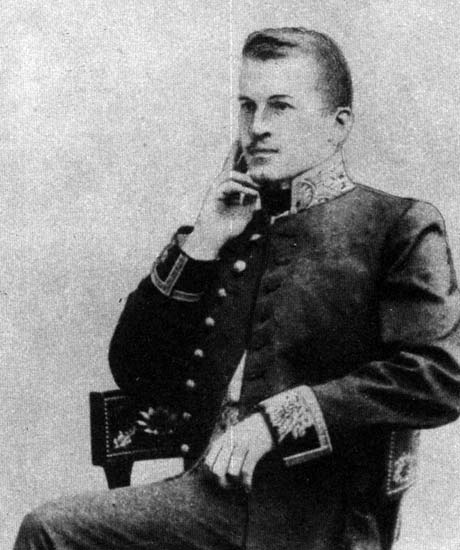
- Born: 5 July [O.S. 23 June] 1878
- Died: 11 March 1960
- Education: Saint Petersburg State University Faculty of Law
- Spouse: Countess Maria Lvovna Tolstaya
- Children: Sergey Obolensky
- Family: Obolensky

Prince Nikolai Leonidovich Obolensky (Russian: Никола́й Леони́дович Оболе́нский; 5 July [O.S. 23 June] 1878 – 11 March 1960) was a Russian governor. Born Orthodox by his princely origin of the Obolensky Russian family of the Rurik Dynasty. In exile he was converted to Catholicism and became a member of the Russian apostolate abroad.

== Biography ==
In 1901 Obolensky graduated from the Faculty of Law, Saint Petersburg State University. He was a member of the Russian Zemstvo. He was also head of the Civil Office of the headquarters of the Supreme Commander (1914-1915). In his career Obolensky was a State Counsellor (1914), member of the Ministry of Internal Affairs (Russia) (1915) and Chairman of the Special Committee for the Struggle against high prices (1916). He was assistant of Warsaw Governor-General, Pavel Yengalychev in 1915. He was also Governor of Kursk Governorate (15/09/1915 - 12/07/1915), Kharkov Governorate (1915) and Yaroslavl Governorate (1916 - 11/05/1917), being dismissed from his post by the decree of the Provisional Government. In exile since 1925, he lived in France. Since 1957, he was honorary chairman of the family union of Prince Obolensky. Together with his son, Sergei Nikolaevich Obolensky adopted Catholicism, and became a member of Russian apostolate.
