= Sophocles Sophocleous (academic) =

Greek professor

Dr Sophocles Sophocleous
- Σοφοκλής Σοφοκλέους
- Website: heritage.org.cy

Sophocles Sophocleous was born and educated in Lefkosia. He then studied at the University of Human Sciences of Strasbourg and Paris-X-Nanterre and at ICCROM in Rome.

He is a university professor in the areas of Art History, Archaeology and Cultural Heritage. He specialised within his post-graduate studies and his up today research and publications in Classical and Byzantine art and archaeology, cultural heritage and Museology. His research areas spread on Classical, Byzantine and Post-Byzantine art and archaeology, European and Middle East art history, cultural heritage, religious and mythological imagery, iconographic analysis and history of aesthetics, theory and practice of conservation/restoration and museology.

He worked at the Bishopric of Limassol for five years, where he recorded the Byzantine and Post-Byzantine heritage of more than 100 communities and municipalities of the district of Limassol and in various monasteries of this area. He was then appointed District Archaeological Officer at Paphos within the Department of Antiquities of Cyprus.

In 1991 he created, and since then he is directing, the Centre of Cultural Heritage ( www.heritage.org.cy ). He is the author, editor and/or designer of several books and exhibitions' catalogues and three poems' collections (see www.adademia.edu). He participated in European Programs, he curated a series of important exhibitions in Cyprus, France and U.K. and organised various local museums in Cyprus.

He was invited Professor (Directeur d'Etudes Invité) at the Ecole Pratique des Hautes Etudes, Sorbonne, Paris (1996-1998) and lectured in Cypriote and European universities. He was then Professor of Art History, Archaeology and Cultural Heritage at the University of Nicosia (2005-2011). From the Spring Semester 2015 he is currently teaching Art History, Archaeology, Mythology and Cultural Heritage in the seminars of the Centre of Cultural Heritage (see www.heritage.org.cy "Seminars").

Dr Sophocleous gave papers in local and international congresses, published in their proceedings. He is currently publishing the results of his research in monographs or edited books, as well as in Cypriot and international scientific periodicals. In 2011 the French Republic honored him with the distinction of "Chevalier de l'Ordre des Arts et Lettres" and in 2012 he was honored by the Cyprus Green Party with the Prize of Architectural Heritage in memory of Neoptolemos Michaëlides.
