= David Winfield (conservator) =

British conservator and Byzantinist

David Crampton Winfield MBE (2 December 1929 - 28 September 2013) was a British conservator and Byzantinist who specialised in wall paintings. The first part of his career was spent abroad, mainly in Turkey and Cyprus, and he was awarded an MBE in 1974 for his conservation work in Cyprus. In his obituary in The Times, David Winfield was described as “an investigative archaeological explorer cast in the mould of the great 19th-century scholar-travellers”.

Later in his career he worked in the United Kingdom and was appointed the first Surveyor of Conservation for the National Trust in 1981.

== Early life and education ==
David Winfield was born and raised in Hendon, London. His father was a civil servant, who had been wounded during World War I. His mother Edith died when Winfield was only five years old and David and his brother were largely brought up by his father's sisters. Sadly, both his father and his brother, who was six years older than Winfield and who had been a prisoner of war in World War II, died before Winfield turned thirty.

Winfield was a boarder at Bryanston School in Dorset and went on to read Modern History at Merton College in Oxford, graduating in 1954. Having acquired a taste for exploring Byzantine art and architecture on a student motorcycle road trip across Europe to Istanbul via Mount Athos, Winfield, upon the advice of two of the leading academics of the time, Gervase Mathew and David Talbot Rice, applied for and won a British Council Scholarship. This award enabled him to spend two years at Belgrade University where he worked with major Serbian art historians and, in the summer holidays, he acquired valuable wall painting conservation techniques at the 13th century monastery in Sopoćani; an UN-sponsored project run by an Italian team.

== Career ==
Winfield’s experience in the Balkans led him to write his first paper, Four Historical Compositions from the Medieval Kingdom of Serbia, which was published in the journal Byzantinoslavica 19, no.2 in 1958. He went on to publish many books and articles on his archaeological and conservation work, often in collaboration with his wife June. They met in Trabzon while she was a student assistant in charge of architectural drawings and images on the project on which they were both working. They continued to work together throughout his career.

Winfield’s 1985 publication, with Professor Anthony Bryer, on the Byzantine monuments and topography of the Pontus is described, in one review, as the most detailed work on the subject written in English and unlikely to be surpassed.

=== Turkey ===
Winfield’s first major project was in the Church of Hagia Sophia (Saint Sophia) in Trebizond (modern-day Trabzon) after he was approached by David Talbot Rice in 1957 to be the field director of the project. Winfield was appointed to investigate the frescoes, undertaking any restoration that was required, and he carried out this work for the next five years. The project, under the sponsorship of the British Institute of Archaeology in Ankara and funded by the Walker Trust of St Andrew, was considered ground-breaking as Talbot Rice was able to secure a permit from the Turkish government to uncover Christian paintings in a building that was, at the time, a working mosque. The removal of the whitewash from the walls revealed frescoes that have been described as ‘magnificent’ examples of church paintings. As Lutgarde Vandeput observed, in an article for the journal, Anatolian Studies in 2008, the paintings were considered important “not only because they raised questions about the origin and development of painting techniques, but also because of the information they provided about artistic development and stylistic innovations in 13th century Christianity”. At the end of the venture, and, having been persuaded by Winfield who, with his wife, had become well known in Trabzon, the local governor gave his permission for the church to be reopened as a museum. In 2013 a decision was made to turn the museum back into an active mosque.

Work at Hagia Sophia was concluded in 1962, and, in 1963, Winfield obtained a grant from the Marjory Wardrop Fund for Georgian Studies at the University of Oxford to study the Georgian churches in and around the valleys of the Çoruh river to the east of Trabzon. Winfield’s findings were published in the Journal of Warburg and Courtauld Institutes in 1968.

In 1962 Winfield, along with Michael Gough, made a visit to the Eski Gümüş Monastery, a rock-carved complex, located just outside Niğde. After obtaining a grant from the Russell Trust, they, and a team of workers, including June Winfield and Mary Gough, undertook cleaning and restoration work on the Byzantine wall-paintings in the rock-cut church over the next few years. Their work uncovered well-preserved paintings depicting New Testament scenes, believed to date from the eleventh or twelfth centuries AD. A significant discovery that was reported in The Times on 25 October 1963. A further discovery was a series of paintings on the walls of a room above the narthex that were identified as illustrations of Aesop’s Fables.

Early on in his time in Trabzon, Winfield met Anthony Bryer, and this encounter proved to be a fruitful experience. With common interests, particularly the study of the monuments of the Pontos, these fellow scholars became intrepid explorers of the region. During weekends they travelled along the coast and traversed the valleys and highlands recording the remnants of the Byzantine and Greek history of the area before many of the structures were destroyed for ever. Although the survey was completed in the 1970s, the resultant two-volume study did not appear until 1985.

In 1964-5, Winfield was appointed research fellow at Dumbarton Oaks having been a visiting fellow in the previous academic year. Originally Winfield was to be based in Istanbul, but as work and funding became more difficult in Turkey, David and June Winfield moved to Cyprus.

=== Cyprus ===
During the years between 1952 and 1978, Dumbarton Oaks sponsored the excavation and/or restoration of major monuments on Cyprus and, for almost a decade, David Winfield and his wife lived in Cyprus working primarily on the church of the Panagia tou Arakos, Lagoudera. Winfield oversaw the restoration and conservation of the paintings during the years 1968-73 and June Winfield analysed the images and made drawings. The Winfields later published a significant book on their work, The Church of the Panaghia tou Arakos at Lagoudhera, Cyprus: The Paintings and Their Painterly Significance, in 2003.

Prior to that work, Winfield, alongside Ernest Hawkins, cleaned the wall-paintings of The Church of Our Lady (the Panagia Phorbiotissa) in Asinou of the soot from candles which had been pressed into the plaster by worshippers. He also worked on churches in Monagri and Pera Chorio and the Agios Neophytos Monastery near Paphos on which Hawkins had previously worked.

During the 1970s the funding for field research provided by Dumbarton Oaks decreased significantly and, when the work at Lagoudera came to an end in 1973, the Winfields moved back to England, initially resettling in Oxford.

=== United Kingdom ===
On his return, Winfield’s important work in Cyprus was recognised by the British Government and he was awarded the MBE in the New Year’s Honours list of 1 January 1974, for ‘services to the restoration of religious works of art in Cyprus’.

After moving back to the United Kingdom, and with the assistance of a number of grants, firstly as a visiting fellow at All Souls College, followed by the appointment as senior research fellow at Merton College, Winfield wrote up some of the findings from his work abroad.

In 1979 he became the founder and director of the Workshop for the Conservation of Wall paintings at Canterbury Cathedral, and during this period he worked on the restoration of the ceiling paintings in the Jesus Chapel.

In 1981, the National Trust appointed Winfield as its first Surveyor of Conservation and he was instrumental in building up the conservation arm of the National Trust. He set up the Cliveden conservation workshop for stone and plaster and appointed freelance conservators to advise on the maintenance and remedial treatment of metal, leather, stained glass, wall paintings and other media. In 1984 he wrote the foreword to the National Trust’s Manual of Housekeeping, a practical guide to the care of historic buildings and their contents. He retired from the National Trust in 1989.

Although Winfield no longer held an official post, after he and his wife moved to the Isle of Mull, they continued their academic work, as David’s LinkedIn profile attested “I maintain an Highland hill farm and spend my other time writing on conservation in the world of Byzantine wall paintings and mosaics”. It was during this time that two of their major works were published. David also travelled down from Mull to lecture on wall painting conservation at The Courtauld Institute of Art to whom he donated his collection of fallen fragments of painted plaster from sites he had worked on over the years for analyse by students of conservation.

== Photography ==
In 2016, an exhibition Byzantium’s Other Empire: Trebizond curated by Antony Eastmond, AG Leventis Professor of Byzantine Art History at the Courtauld, opened at Koç University's ANAMED Gallery in Istanbul. The exhibition focused on the church of Hagia Sophia in Trebizond and drew extensively on the photograph and drawing archives of David and June Winfield, held by the Conway Library at the Courtauld Institute of Art. Winfield who had close ties with the Courtauld had, during his lifetime, given prints of his black and white photographs to the Conway Library, who are currently in the process of digitising their archive of primarily architectural images under the wider Courtauld Connects project, and, after his death, his widow, June, donated a large portion of his archive of images and notes to the Courtauld including negatives and colour slides.

It is fortunate that photographs had already been deposited with the Conway Library and Dumbarton Oaks and that some other negatives and slides survived a fire at Druimghigha Farm that destroyed much of the Winfields’ library because of their importance. In an interview by Robin Cormack for Dumbarton Oakes in 2011, Professor Cormack stresses the importance of David Winfield’s career and how he “took a lot of very good photographs”; photographs that can be used as a resource by scholars who, for example, were unable to see the Byzantine art in the church of Hagia Sophia which was covered over when the church reverted back to being a mosque in 2013. Additionally, many of the sites Winfield worked on over the years have subsequently been vandalised, looted or otherwise damaged.

== Private life ==
Winfield married June Wainwright and they had three children, Edward, Diana and Nancy, all of whom were born in the hospital in Nicosia during the time the couple lived in Lagoudera. The children spent their early years in Cyprus attending the village school and being home schooled by their mother. Later in life, Winfield and his wife bought a dilapidated farmhouse on Mull and took up farming. He died on the Isle of Mull on Saturday 28 September 2013 and is buried there.

== Selected publications ==
- ‘The Church of Our Lady at Asinou, Cyprus. A Report on the Seasons of 1965 and 1966’, David C. Winfield and Ernest J. W. Hawkins, in Dumbarton Oaks Papers, Vol.21, 1967, pp. 260–266
- ‘Some Early Medieval Figure Sculpture from North East Turkey’ in the Journal of Warburg and Courtauld Institutions, Vol.38, 1968, pp. 33–72
- Middle and Later Byzantine Wall Painting Methods. A Comparative Study’ in Dumbarton Oaks Papers, Vol.22, 1968, pp. 61–139
- ‘Cities of Heraclius’ in Byzantine and Modern Greek Studies, Thomas S. Brown, Anthony Bryer & David Winfield, Volume 4, 1978
- Proportion and Structure of the Human Figure in Byzantine Wall Painting and Mosaic, British Archaeological Reports International Series, David and June Winfield, Oxford : BAR Publishing, 1982, ISBN 9780860541967
- ‘The restoration of the painted ceiling, the Jesus Chapel, Canterbury cathedral’ in The Conservator, Deborah Langslow, Fiona Allardyce, Anne Worrall & David Winfield, Volume 8, Issue 1, 1984
- Byzantine Fortifications, with Clive Foss, Pretoria : University of South Africa, 1986, ISBN 0869813218
- The Byzantine Monuments and Topography of the Pontos, with maps and plans by Richard Anderson and drawings by June Winfield, 2 volumes, Anthony Bryer and David Winfield, Washington, DC : Dumbarton Oaks Research Library and Collection,1985, ISBN 9780884021223
- The Church of the Panaghia tou Arakos at Lagoudhera, Cyprus: The Paintings and Their Painterly Significance, David Winfield and June Winfield, Washington, DC : Dumbarton Oaks Research Library and Collection, 2003, ISBN 9780884022572
- Byzantine Mosaic Work : Notes on history, technique & colour, Lefkosia, Cyprus: Moufflon Publications, 2005, ISBN 9789963642175
