= Mikhail Davydov =

Mikhail Davydov may refer to:

- Mikhail Davydov (footballer) (born 1972), Russian football player
- Mikhail Davydov (oncologist) (1947–2025), Russian oncologist
- Mikhail Davydov (historian) (born 1954), Russian and Soviet historian
