= Evgenija Davydova =

Russian equestrian

Personal information
- Born: Evgenija Davydova; Mar 2, 1984 (age 42)

Sport
- Country: Russia
- Sport: Dressage

Achievements and titles
- World finals: 2018 FEI World Equestrian Games

Evgenija Davydova (born 2 March 1984) is a Russian equestrian athlete. She competed at the 2018 FEI World Equestrian Games and at the European Dressage Championships in 2019 with her horse Awakening. She is based in Italy where she trains with Russian\Italian dressage rider Tatiana Miloserdova.
