= Davydovo, Vashkinsky District, Vologda Oblast =

Davydovo Давыдово
- Village
- Location within Vologda Oblast Location within Russia
- Coordinates: 60°27′N 37°56′E
- Country: Russia
- Region: Vologda Oblast
- District: Vashkinsky District
- Time zone: UTC+3:00

Davydovo (Russian: Давыдово) is a rural locality (a village) in Andreyevskoye Rural Settlement, Vashkinsky District, Vologda Oblast, Russia. The population was 117 as of 2002. There are 7 streets.

== Geography ==
Davydovo is located 26 km north of Lipin Bor (the district's administrative centre) by road. Kononovo is the nearest rural locality.
