= Davydovo, Kameshkovsky District, Vladimir Oblast =

Davydovo Давыдово
- Selo
- Location within Vladimir Oblast Location within Russia
- Coordinates: 56°10′N 40°43′E
- Country: Russia
- Region: Vladimir Oblast
- District: Kameshkovsky District
- Time zone: UTC+3:00

Davydovo (Russian: Давыдово) is a rural locality (a selo) in Vtorovskoye Rural Settlement, Kameshkovsky District, Vladimir Oblast, Russia. The population was 86 as of 2010.

== Geography ==
Davydovo is located 30 km southwest of Kameshkovo (the district's administrative centre) by road. Filyandino is the nearest rural locality.
