= Davydovo, Gus-Khrustalny District, Vladimir Oblast =

Davydovo Давыдово
- Village
- Location within Vladimir Oblast Location within Russia
- Coordinates: 55°41′N 41°01′E
- Country: Russia
- Region: Vladimir Oblast
- District: Gus-Khrustalny District
- Time zone: UTC+3:00

Davydovo (Russian: Давы́дово) is a rural locality (a village) in Posyolok Krasnoye Ekho, Gus-Khrustalny District, Vladimir Oblast, Russia. It is recognized for its historical significance and picturesque rural setting.

According to the data from 2010, the population of Davydovo was 11 residents [2]. The village offers a glimpse into the rural lifestyle and cultural heritage of the region.

== Geography ==
Davydovo is located on the Sudogda River, 31 km northeast of Gus-Khrustalny (the district's administrative centre) by road. Semyonovka is the nearest rural locality.
