= Leon Davidoff =

American politician

West Hartford Deputy Mayor
- Incumbent
- Assumed office May 16, 2016
- Preceded by: Shari Cantor

West Hartford Town Councilor
- Incumbent
- Assumed office 2007

Personal details
- Born: Leon Stuart Davidoff; May 26, 1962 (age 64)
- Party: Democratic
- Spouse: Alexis Silverstein Davidoff
- Children: Becky Davidoff; Lani Davidoff
- Education: Clark University; Case Western Reserve University School of Law (JD)
- Website: leonsdavidofftowncouncil.blogspot.com

Leon Stuart Davidoff is an American politician, lawyer, businessman, and the deputy mayor of West Hartford. Succeeding the retiring Essie Labrot, Leon Davidoff was sworn in as Town Clerk on April 10, 2023. In 2007, he was elected to the West Hartford Town Council, Davidoff has served as deputy mayor since 2016. He previously served on the Newington Town Council.

Davidoff attended Newington High School, graduating in 1980. He went on to study government and economics at Clark University, and received his J.D. from Case Western Reserve University School of Law in 1987.

A former Republican, Davidoff became a Democrat while on the West Hartford Town Council.
