= Davidov (disambiguation) =

Davidov is a surname.

Davidov may also refer to:

- Davidov (municipality), a village and municipality in Slovakia
- Davidov Stradivarius, a cello once owned by Karl Davidov, built in 1712 by Antonio Stradivari.
- Davidov Spur, a ridge in Antarctica
