= Davidov (municipality) =

- Municipality
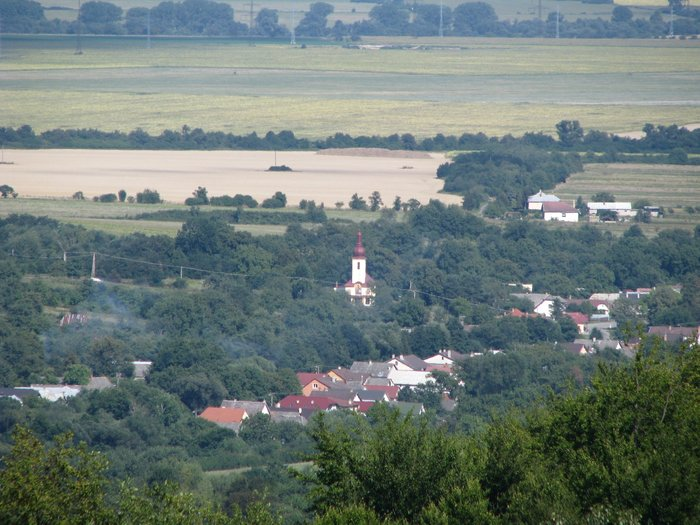

- Flag

- Location of Davidov in the Prešov Region Location of Davidov in Slovakia
- Coordinates: 48°50′N 21°38′E
- Country: Slovakia
- Region: Prešov Region
- District: Vranov nad Topľou District
- First mentioned: 1361

Area
  - Total: 16.78 km^{2} (6.48 sq mi)
- Elevation: 196 m (643 ft)

Population (2025)
  - Total: 774
- Time zone: UTC+1 (CET)
  - Summer (DST): UTC+2 (CEST)
- Postal code: 930 3
- Area code: +421 57
- Vehicle registration plate (until 2022): VT
- Website: www.davidov.sk

Davidov (Hungarian: Dávidvágása) is a village and municipality in the Vranov nad Topľou District in the Prešov Region of Slovakia.

== Geography ==
The municipality lies at an altitude of 196 metres (643 ft) and covers an area of 16.78 km^{2} (6.48 sq mi) (2025).

== Population ==
Population statistic (10 years)
Year	1995	2005	2015	2025
Count	879	840	791	774
Difference		−4.43%	−5.83%	−2.14%

Population statistic
Year	2024	2025
Count	767	774
Difference		+0.91%

It has a population of 774 people (31 December 2025).

=== Ethnicity ===
Census 2021 (1+ %)
Ethnicity	Number	Fraction
Slovak	773	98.97%
Total	781	

In year 2021 was 781 people by ethnicity 773 as Slovak, 7 as Not found out, 4 as Rusyn, 2 as Czech, 2 as Hungarian, 1 as Russian, 1 as German and 1 as Greek.

Note on population: The difference values of population numbers in the table "Population statistic" and in the sections "Ethnicity" & "Religion" is caused by the use of various statistical methods.

=== Religion ===
Census 2021 (1+ %)
Religion	Number	Fraction
Greek Catholic Church	566	72.47%
Roman Catholic Church	173	22.15%
None	23	2.94%
Evangelical Church	8	1.02%
Total	781	

In year 2021 was 781 people by religion 566 from Greek Catholic Church, 173 from Roman Catholic Church, 23 from None, 8 from Evangelical Church, 7 from Not found out, 1 from Calvinist Church, 1 from Eastern Orthodox Church, 1 from Other and not ascertained christian church and 1 from Other.

According to the 2011 census, the municipality had 794 inhabitants. 784 of inhabitants were Slovaks and 10 others and unspecified.

== See also ==
- List of municipalities and towns in Slovakia

== Genealogical resources ==
The records for genealogical research are available at the state archive "Statny Archiv in Presov, Slovakia"

- Roman Catholic church records (births/marriages/deaths): 1770-1895 (parish B)
- Greek Catholic church records (births/marriages/deaths): 1780-1933 (parish A)
