= Lagoudera =

Lagoudera: Λαγουδερά (Greek); Lagudera (Turkish)
- Village
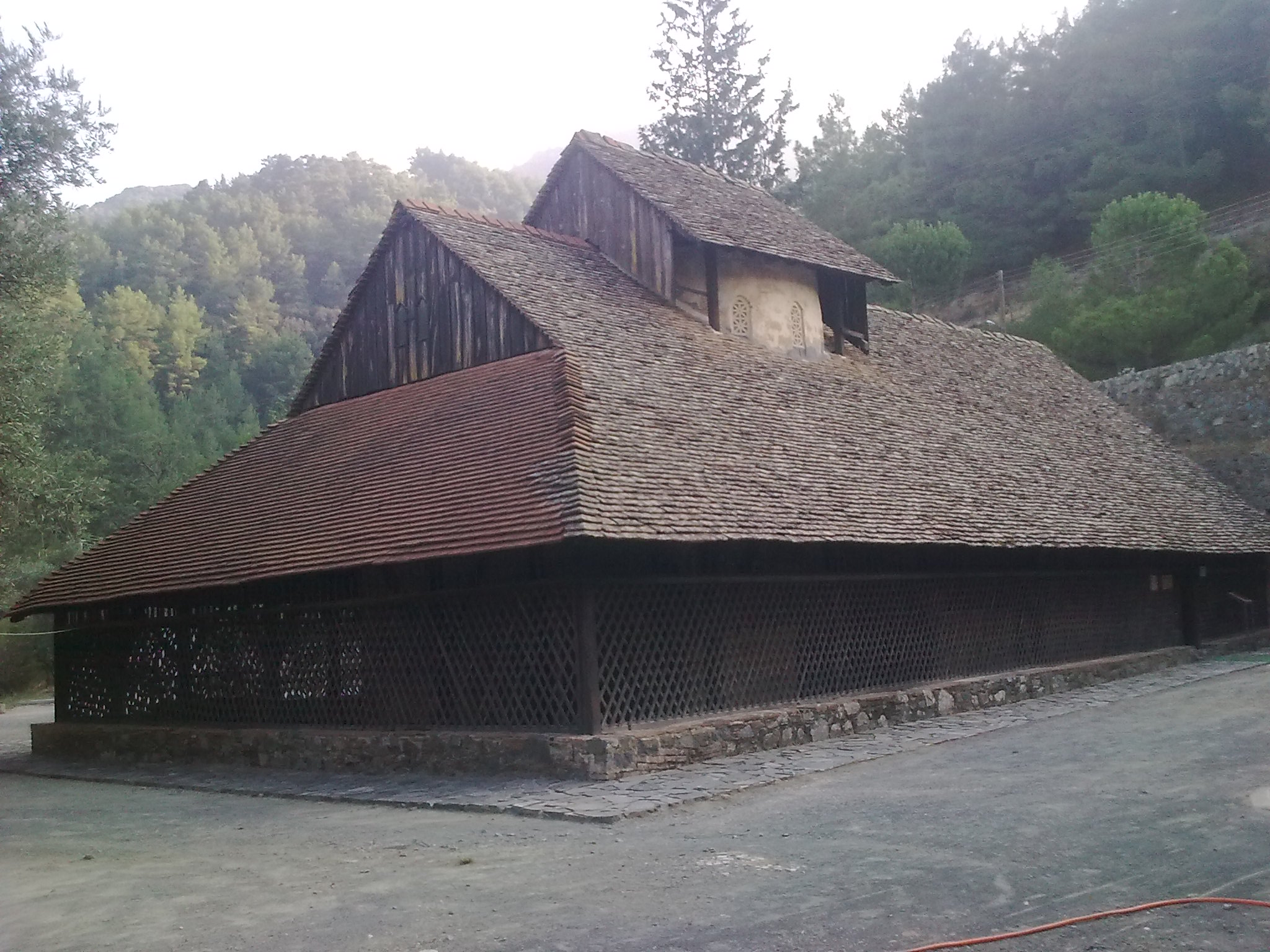
- Panagia tou Araka

- Location in Cyprus
- Coordinates: 34°57′45″N 33°0′37″E
- Country: Cyprus
- District: Nicosia District

Population (2011)
  - Total: 84
- Time zone: UTC+2 (EET)
  - Summer (DST): UTC+3 (EEST)

Lagoudera (Greek: Λαγουδερά; Turkish: Lagudera) is a village in the Nicosia District of Cyprus, located near Chandria.

Lagoudera village is about 50 km from Nicosia under Madari peak, the island's second highest peak on the Troodos Mountains. It is famous for the Panagia tou Araka church, a 12th-century monastery covered with fine frescoes, which is situated just outside the village. Together with Asinou church and that of Agios Nikolaos tis Stegis, it is considered to be one of the most important Byzantine churches of the island. It is UNESCO World Heritage Site along with nine other Painted Churches in the Troödos Region.

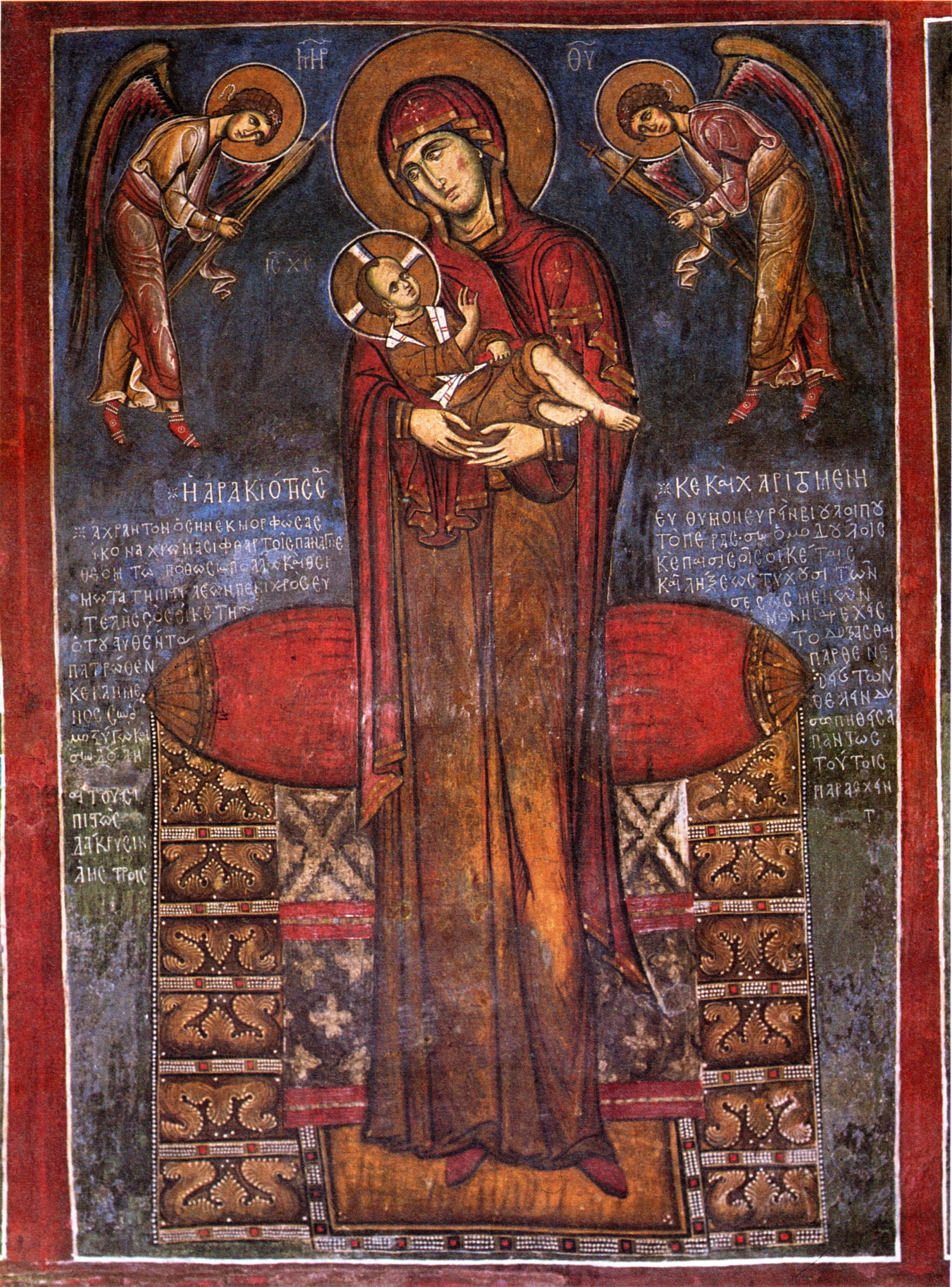
