= Aleksandr Davydov (footballer) =

Russian footballer

Personal information
- Full name: Aleksandr Vladimirovich Davydov
- Date of birth: 12 May 1977 (age 49)
- Place of birth: Vyksa, Russian SFSR
- Height: 1.77 m (5 ft 10 in)
- Position: Goalkeeper

Senior career*
Years	Team	Apps	(Gls)
2000–2003	FC Metallurg Vyksa	68	(0)
2004–2005	FC Avangard Kursk	35	(0)
2012–2014	FC Metallurg Vyksa	45	(0)
- * Club domestic league appearances and goals

Aleksandr Vladimirovich Davydov (Russian: Александр Владимирович Давыдов; born 12 May 1977) is a former Russian football goalkeeper.

== Club career ==
He played in the Russian Football National League for FC Avangard Kursk in 2005.
