= Alexis Dawydoff =

Russian and American aviator, journalist, and Russian nobility (1903–1965)

- Born: 1903; Saint Petersburg, Russian Empire
- Died: 1 August 1965 (aged 61–62)
- House: Obolensky
- Father: Peter Vasilievich Dawydoff
- Mother: Marie Dmitrievna Obolensky

Alexis Petrovich Dawydoff (also known as Alex Dawydoff; Russian: Алексей Давыдов; 1903 – 1 August 1965) was a Russian and American aviation journalist, author, editor, and pioneering soaring enthusiast, and a member of the Obolensky house of Russian nobility.

He emigrated to the United States after the Russian Revolution and became a prominent figure in American aviation journalism and glider flying. He served as the first full-time editor of Soaring magazine for the Soaring Society of America (SSA) and co-authored the popular reference book Airplanes of the World.

== Early life ==
Alexis Petrovich Dawydoff was born in Saint Petersburg, Russia in 1903 into the aristocratic Davydov and Obolensky families of the Russian Empire. He was the son of Pyotr Vasilievich Davydov (1879–1916), a director of the Anatra aircraft manufacturing firm, and Princess Maria Dmitrievna Obolensky from the ancient Rurikid House of Obolensky, daughter of Prince Dmitry Dmitrievich Obolensky (1844–1931), a senior Imperial Russian court official, journalist, and Marshal of the Nobility.

Alexis spent much of his childhood on his family’s estate in the Kiev province.

Following the death of his father in 1916 and the upheaval of the Russian Revolution and Civil War, Dawydoff, who spoke, read, and wrote English fluently, served with British and United States naval forces assisting the anti-Bolshevik White Russians. He emigrated to the United States in 1921 with his mother Marie, and sister Lili.

After arriving in America, he attended Alma College and later Columbia University before beginning his aviation career with the Sikorsky Aviation Corporation in 1926, laying the foundation for his later work as a glider pilot, aviation editor, and writer.

== Career ==
In 1925, Dawydoff joined the Sikorsky aviation company in the United States, working at Roosevelt Field, Long Island, during the construction of the twin-engine S-29. He briefly worked on Wall Street before becoming a salesman for the aviation firm Air Associates, Inc. His transition to gliding began when J.C. Penney, Jr., persuaded him to try the sport on Cape Cod. He quickly became an enthusiast and instructor, training with figures like Hawley Bowlus.

During his gliding career, he suffered a serious accident when an elevator control turnbuckle failed at low altitude, resulting in a year-long hospitalization and a permanently stiff leg. He continued flying despite the injury.

Dawydoff’s journalism career included roles as technical editor of Air Trails magazine (where he started one of the first dedicated gliding columns in an aviation publication) and its sister title Air Progress. He worked there until 1956, with interruptions for U.S. Army Air Forces service in the T-2 section during World War II and a project redesigning the Kirby Cadet glider.

He later joined Flying magazine, rising to managing editor, before becoming the first full-time editor of Soaring magazine for the SSA in 1964.

== Personal life and death ==
Dawydoff was known in New York society circles in the 1930s as Prince Alexis Davidoff. Dawydoff attended his sister Lili's wedding to Willard Karn. He was involved in a notable 1938 automobile accident but was cleared of charges.

He died on 1 August 1965 of a heart ailment. He was inducted posthumously into the National Soaring Museum Hall of Fame in 1967.
