= Davydovo, Cherepovetsky District, Vologda Oblast =

Davydovo Давыдово
- Village
- Location within Vologda Oblast Location within Russia
- Coordinates: 58°54′N 37°16′E
- Country: Russia
- Region: Vologda Oblast
- District: Cherepovetsky District
- Time zone: UTC+3:00

Davydovo (Russian: Давыдово) is a rural locality (a village) in Korotovskoye Rural Settlement, Cherepovetsky District, Vologda Oblast, Russia. The population was 25 as of 2002.

== Geography ==
Davydovo is located 70 km (43 mi) southwest of Cherepovets (the district's administrative centre) by road. Supronovo is the nearest rural locality.
