= Judith Davidoff =

American violist and cellist (1927–2021)

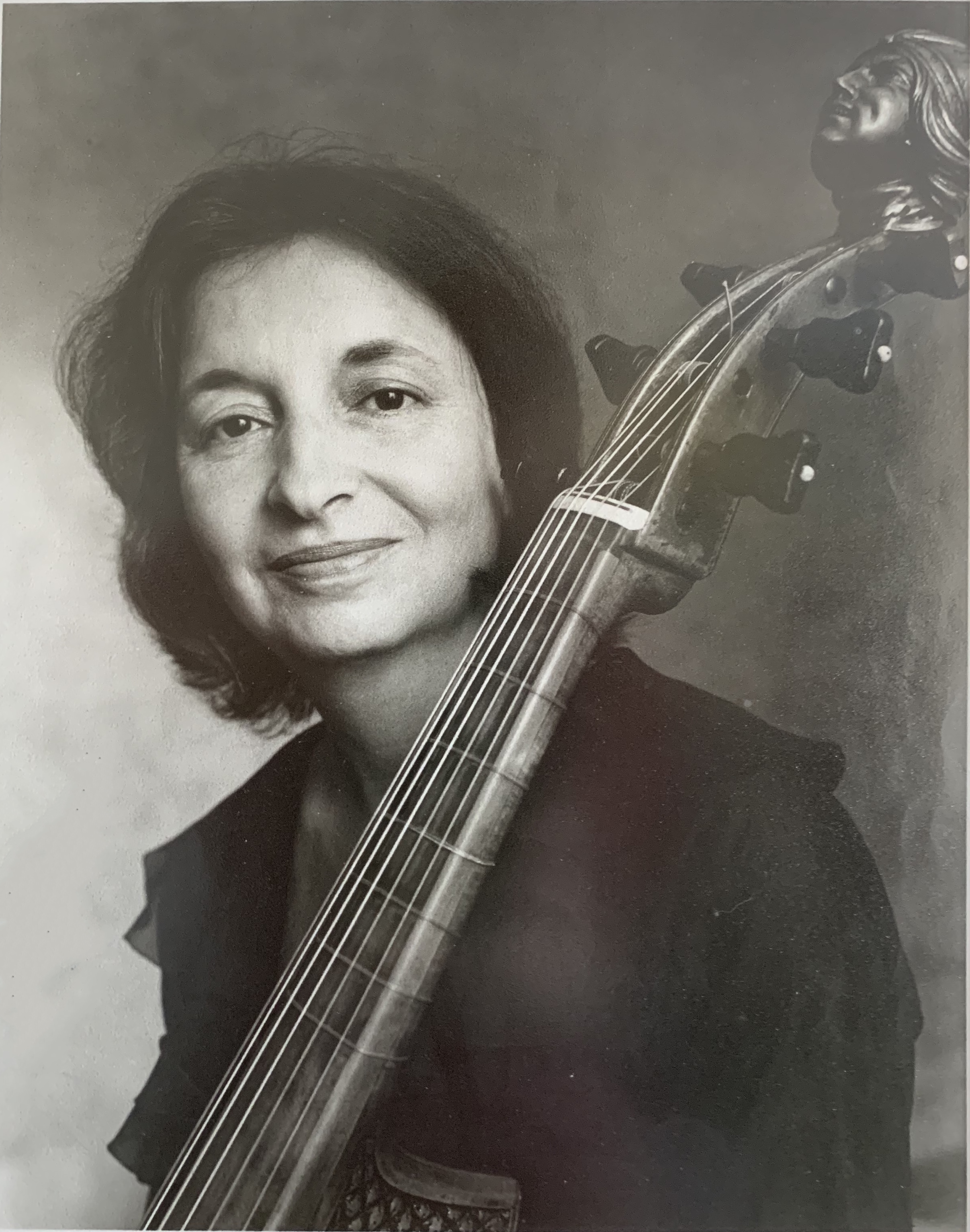

Background information
- Born: 21 October 1927; Boston, United States
- Died: 19 December 2021 (aged 94) New York, United States
- Genres: Early Music
- Occupations: Musician and teacher
- Instruments: viols, baroque cello, medieval bowed instruments, Erhu
- Years active: 1939-2021

Judith Davidoff (21 October 1927 – 19 December 2021) was an American viol player, cellist, and performer on the medieval bowed instruments. She was considered the “Grande Dame of the viol”, "a master of the viola da gamba and other stringed instruments" and "a central part of the early-music scene." Her recorded performances reflect her wide range of repertoire and styles, including such works as Schoenberg's Verklaerte Nacht and 13th-century monody. She is responsible for the catalog of 20th- and 21st-century viol music.

== Musical education ==
Judith Davidoff began musical studies at age 7 and made her public debut at 12. A native of Boston, she was a graduate of Radcliffe College and the Longy School of Music, where she received a soloist diploma in cello. Long interested in folk music, she studied the Black Sea kemence and the saz in Turkey, and the erhu in Taiwan. In the fifties she took up the viol, which she studied privately with Alison Fowle.

== Ensembles ==
Davidoff participated in a number of ensembles, performing viols, early strings (vielle, rebec, kemence), the baryton, and the baroque, classical and modern cello.

She was a member of American early music ensembles, starting in the fifties with New York Pro Musica, which she joined as a viol and early strings player at the invitation of Noah Greenberg – which caused her to move from Boston to New York City.

At the request of the then director of New York Pro Musica, Noah Greenberg, she created a viol consort, which became an independent ensemble in 1972, under the name of New York Consort of Viols, and performed uninterruptedly until 2015, during more than four decades. Under the artistic direction of Davidoff, that ensemble presented concerts both in the United States and abroad, as well as offering workshops and outreach activities. The Consort commissioned new works for viols and produced numerous recordings, in its mission to familiarize audiences with the sound and repertoire of the viol. It also collaborated with early music ensembles such as Pomerium, Zephyrus, the Boston Viol Consort, the Yukimi Kambe Viol Consort, the Waverly Consort, the Ensemble for Early Music and Music For A While and Ensemble PHOENIX, Israel (2013).

She performed also with the Boston Camerata (founding member – viols, early fiddles, baryton, tromba marina), the Waverly Consort (viols, early fiddles, baroque cello), Music for a While (viols, early fiddles), the Cambridge Consort, and the Agassiz Trio (classical cello).

As a modern cellist, she participated in the Helikon String Quartet (founding member), in the Brandeis University Resident Quartet and the Arioso Trio.

== Recordings ==
- Verklaerte Nacht, Music from Marlboro, Columbia Records 1961
- C. Monteverdi, Monteverdi Secular Vocal Works (LP). Hugues Cuénod, Daniel Pinkham, Judith Davidoff, Robert Brink. Music Guild Records – MS-109, 1962.
- Dietrich Buxtehude, Sonatas, op. 1 for violin, viola da gamba and harpsichord. Robert Brink, Judith Davidoff, Daniel Pinkham. Music Guild Records 1965
- J.S. Bach, Six Sonatas For Violin And Harpsichord, Two Sonatas For Violin and Bass Continuo. Sonya Monosoff, James Weaver, Judith Davidoff. Cambridge Records CRS B 2822, 1970
- Marin Marais Pièces De Viole (from the second book, 1701), John Hsu, Louis Bagger, Judith Davidoff. (LP) Musical Heritage Society, Inc. MHS 3078, 1974.
- Dances Of Three Centuries, LaNoue Davenport, Judith Davidoff, Susan Evans. (LP) Music Minus One MMO 20, 1974
- Eighteenth Century Recorder Music, LaNoue Davenport, Mark Davenport, Judith Davidoff, Edward Smith - (LP) Music Minus One MMO 211, 1974
- Marin Marais, Pièces De Viole From Suitte d'un goût Etranger, Book Four, 1717 - John Hsu, Louis Bagger, Judith Davidoff . (LP) Musical Heritage Society MHS 3298, 1975.
- Marin Marais, Pièces De Viole From Book Five, 1725, John Hsu, Louis Bagger, Judith Davidoff . (LP) Musical Heritage Society MHS 3356. 1976.
- Marin Marais, Pièces De Viole (from the first book, 1686), John Hsu, Louis Bagger, Judith Davidoff - (LP) Musical Heritage Society, Inc. MHS 1809.
- Las Cantigas de Santa Maria, Waverly Consort, Vanguard
- Trio by Eleanore Corey, CRI Records
- The King's Musicke, New York Pro Musica, Decca Gold Label
- The Play of Herod, New York Pro Musica, Decca Gold Label
- The Renaissance Band, New York Pro Musica, Decca Gold Label
- La Fontaine Amoureuse, Music For A While, 1750 Arch Records
- Cantatas and Arias of Alessandro Stradella with Pilgrim and E. Smith, MHS (Musical Heritage Society) 3242 (viol continuo)
- Heinrich Ignaz Franz von Biber, Eight Sonatas for Violin and Basso Continuo. Sonya Monosoff, Judith Davidoff, Peter Wof. PLEIADES RECORDS 2P107, 1982
- Francesco Geminiani, Four Sonatas For Violin And Continuo, Sonya Monosoff, James Weaver, Judith Davidoff . (LP) Musical Heritage Society MHS 3744.
- English Consort Music, New York Consort of Viols, Music Minus One MMO3359, 1975
- William Byrd, Music for Viols and Virginals, New York Consort of Viols & Edward Smith, Musical Heritage Society MHS 3460 [1976]
- Shakespeare, The Sweet Power of Musicke, New York Consort of Viols with actor Tom Klunis and soprano Sheila Schonbrun, Musical Heritage Society MHS 4123,1979
- Fantasias and Consort Songs by Orlando Gibbons, New York Consort of Viols, MHS 1983
- Instrumental Music by John Jenkins, New York Consort of Viols. Musical Heritage Society Inc., MHS Stereo 912047M, 1987 vinyl, also Chrome Cassette MHC 312047K, LC Catalog no. 87-743081
- Dances and Canzonas of Holborne and Brade, The New York Consort of Viols: Viola Da Gamba Society of America Project Recording Volume II (CD) Classic masters CMCD-1014,1989
- Illicita Cosa – The Forbidden Thing, New York Consort of Viols, Musical Heritage Society MHS 3235M, 1993
- Music of William Byrd, New York Consort of Viols, Lyrichord LEMS-8015, 1995
- Jan DeGaetani in concert, Vol. 4 (live) - © 1999 Bridge Records with Paul O'Dette and Philip West © 1999 Bridge Records
- Sweet Power of Music, Music from Shakespeare's Time, The New York Consort of Viols with soprano Kristin Gould and lute player Grant Herreid. The New York Consort of Viols 2003.
- Music of Ellen Taafe Zwillich & Eleanor Cory - © 2007 Anthology of recorded Music, Inc.
- The Road From Valencia, New York Consort of Viols. New York Consort of Viols 2011
- The Silent Waterfall: Solo & Chamber Music by David Loeb, New York Consort of viols and others. Vienna Modern Masters, 1st Nov 2011.
- Hidden Pathways: David Loeb, New York Consort of Viols and others. Recording was made in 1990. 2022 Centaur Records Inc, CRC 3920.
- REAWAKENINGS: David Loeb, New York Consort of Viols and others. Recorded in the 80s. 2023 Centaur Records Inc, CRC 4045.

== Teaching ==
She taught at the New England Conservatory and the Longy School of Music while she was a Boston resident. As a New Yorker, she was a member of the music faculties at Sarah Lawrence College, Bronxville, NY (viol, Collegium Musicum) and Columbia Teachers College, New York, NY (viol). She taught also at Columbia University, Extension Division, at SUNY Purchase, Purchase, NY (Music History through Performance), at the Queens College School of Education, Queens, NY, and at Soochow University, Taipei, R.O.C.

She was a faculty member of a number of workshops throughout North America, organized by the Viola da Gamba Society of America, the American Recorder Society, and had been the heart of the New York Consort of Viols one-day and weekend workshops and Children's Outreach workshops at the Riccardo O’Gorman Garden and Library, Harlem. She also gave workshops and masterclasses in Australia, Brazil, Israel, Sweden, Taiwan and Turkey.

A number of professional viol players studied with Judith Davidoff, among them Lucy Bardo, Myrna Herzog, Fortunato Arico, Patricia Neely, Robert Eisenstein, Lesley Retzer, Cecilia Aprigliano.

== Articles and reviews ==
Davidoff contributed two articles for the Journal of the Viola da Gamba Society of America: “Ann Ford: An Eighteenth-century Portrait” (vol. 30, 1993 p. 51) and “The New York Pro Musica and the Soviet Union: Personal Observations of a Viol Player” (vol. 2, 1965 p.30).

Her Ph.D. Dissertation, The Waning and Waxing of the Viol: A Historical Survey and Twentieth-century Catalogue is available online at site of the Viola da Gamba Society of America.
