= Margaret Mullett =

British historian

Margaret Elizabeth Mullett (OBE) (born 1946) is a British historian. She is a professor emerita of Byzantine studies at Queen's University Belfast, and is a former director of Byzantine studies at Dumbarton Oaks Research Library and Collection in Washington, D.C., the foremost centre for the study of Byzantium in North America. Mullett is a leading proponent of a more theoretical approach to Byzantine studies and Byzantine texts.

== Education ==
Mullett read Medieval History and Medieval Latin at Birmingham University. She received her PhD from the Centre for Byzantine Studies, Birmingham University, in 1981. Her dissertation was entitled, Theophylact Through His Letters: the Two Worlds of an Exile Bishop.

== Career ==
As Director at Dumbarton Oaks, Mullett was also the editor of Dumbarton Oaks Papers. Previous to her position at Dumbarton Oaks, she was a Professor of Byzantine Studies and Director of the Institute of Byzantine Studies at the Queen's University of Belfast and Director of the Queen's Gender Initiative. She is the author of Theophylact of Ochrid: Reading the Letters of a Byzantine Archbishop, Variorum, 1997. With Judith Herrin and Catherine Otten-Froux, she edited a Festschrift for A. H. S. Megaw, published in 2001 by the British School in Athens.

Mullett was created an Officer of the Order of the British Empire (OBE) at the Queen's Birthday Honours 2006.

Mullet's portrait is part of 'The Feast of Wisdom', a Byzantine style mural in Queen's University's former Institute of Byzantine Studies created by Colin McGookin. A portrait of Mullet was unveiled at Queen's University Belfast and will hang in the university's Great Hall, alongside other luminaries of the university.

== Bibliography ==
- Knowing Bodies, Passionate Souls: Sense Perception in Byzantium (ed. by Susan Ashbrook Harvey and Margaret Mullett) (Washington, D.C): Dumbarton Oaks Research Library & Collection, 2017)
- Mosaic: Festschrift for A.H.S Megaw, ed. by Judith Herrin, Margaret Mullett, and Catherine Otten-Froux (London: British School in Athens, 2001)
- Theophylact of Ochrid: Reading the Letters of a Byzantine Archbishop (Variorum, 1997)
