= Centre of Cultural Heritage =

Cypriot cultural heritage organization

- Established: 1971; 54 years ago
- Location: Nicosia, Cyprus
- Coordinates: 35.173332°N 33.359512°E

The Centre of Cultural Heritage was established in Cyprus in 1979 and has a service covering the areas of archaeology, history of art, cultural heritage, and natural heritage. The services also include areas such as the recording and digital archiving of the artistic heritage of Cyprus, its restoration and conservation, its study and enhancement through the creation of museums, the organisation of exhibitions and congresses, lectures and scientific programmes, as well as by means of publications.

Since 1990 the Centre has collaborated with Universities, Research Centres, Municipalities and Communities, as well as the Church and the Government of Cyprus, NGOs and individuals in various programmes and projects. Expert studies and consultancies have been carried out for several municipalities and communities of Cyprus. Various contributions were made for further development of the cultural tourism. Also programmes focusing on the recording and study of the natural heritage were carried out, especially the inventory of the traditional plants of Cyprus and Mediterranean and their use for landscaping so that the physiognomy of the traditional landscape is not altered.

The main principle of the Centre is that the results of scientific research must not only be promoted to the academic community, but also to the wider public to improve popular education, self-understanding and awareness.

Since 2010 the Centre was affiliated to the University of Nicosia as a research centre on the areas mentioned above.

The Centre has initiated various research programmes and projects in almost all areas of its activities, such as prehistoric, classical, Byzantine and post-Byzantine art and archaeology, natural and cultural heritage, conservation/restoration, museology, exhibitions, creation of digital archives, etc. The majority of these programmes and projects have been accomplished with book publications or articles in journals, or papers given at congresses. In the case of other projects, restoration of monuments has been realised, or museums have been created or exhibitions held. Other programmes have concerned the recording of the cultural heritage, thus contributing to further completing the archives of the Centre and especially of the Eikonologion and the Mediterranean flora (inventory of the traditional flora of Cyprus and the Mediterranean), usable in landscaping.

Within the framework of the Mediterranean flora project, a series of virtual reality documents showing specific avenues of Nicosia planted with traditional trees of Cyprus has been realised in such combinations as to ensure a harmonious design and chromatology.
