= Davidov =

Davidov (Давидов; feminine Davidova (Давидова)) is a surname meaning "descendant of Давид (David)". Sometimes it may be a transliteration of "Давыдов/Давыдова". Notable people with the surname include:

- Aleksandar Davidov, Serbian footballer
- Alexei Davidov (1867–1940), Russian cellist, composer, and businessman, son of August Davidov
- August Davidov (1823–1885), Russian mathematician and pedagogue, brother of Karl Davidov
- Guy Davidov, Israeli professor of law
- Ivan Davidov (1943–2015), Bulgarian footballer
- Jayar Davidov (died 2023), Israeli police officer
- Karl Davidov (Davydov) (1838–1889), Russian cellist, conductor, composer, and pedagogue, brother of August Davidov
- Lea Davidova-Medene, Latvian sculptor
- Marv Davidov (1931–2012), American peace activist and founder of the Honeywell Project
- Milan Davidov (born 1978), Serbian footballer
- Shani Bloch-Davidov (born 1979), Israeli Olympic racing cyclist
- Toma Davidov (1863–1903), Bulgarian Army officer and participant in the Macedonian Revolutionary Movement,
- Valeriya Davidova (Davydova), Uzbekistani rhythmic gymnast of Russian origin

== See also ==
- Davidoff, a surname
- Davydov, a surname
- Pāvels Davidovs (born 1980), Latvian footballer
- Davidová
