= Davidovo =

Davidovo may refer to:

- In Bulgaria (written in Cyrillic as Давидово):
  - Davidovo, Silistra Province - a village in the Kaynardzha municipality, Silistra Province
  - Davidovo, Targovishte Province - a village in the Targovishte municipality, Targovishte Province
- In North Macedonia
  - Davidovo, Gevgelija - a village in the Gevgelija Municipality

== See also ==
- Davydovo (disambiguation)
