= Ruth Davidow =

American nurse and political activist(1911-1999)

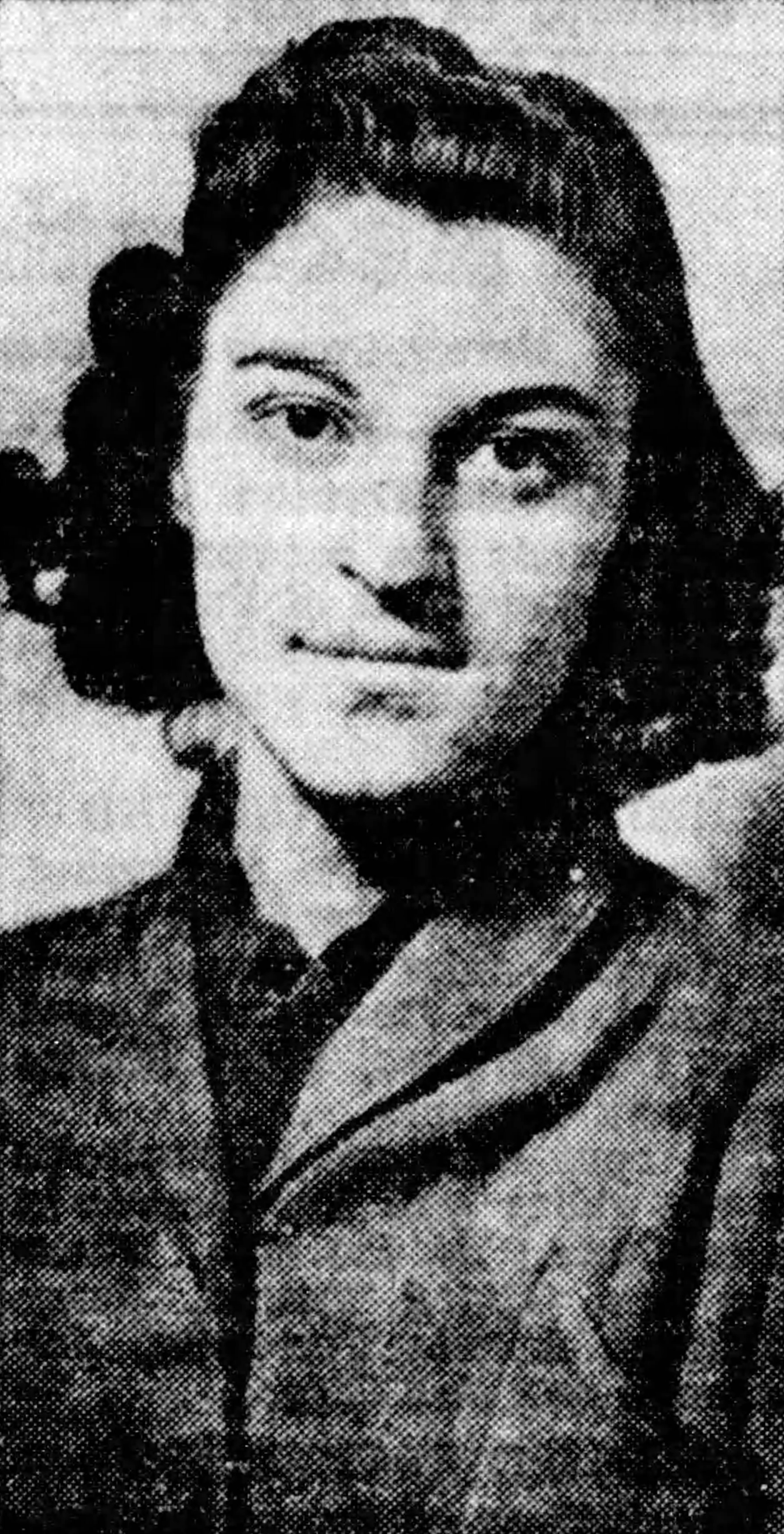
- Davidow c. 1939
- Born: September 1, 1911; Volkovisk, Grodno Governorate, Russian Empire
- Died: June 28, 1999 (aged 87); San Francisco, California, U.S.
- Occupations: Nurse, filmmaker, activist

Ruth Rebecca Davidow (September 01, 1911 – June 28, 1999) was an American nurse, filmmaker, and political activist.

== Early life ==
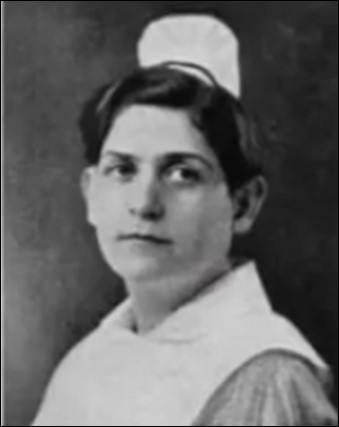
Davidow's nursing school yearbook photo

Born in Volkovisk, Russia on September 01, 1911, Davidow grew up in New York City after her mother, a Jewish socialist, fled tsarist Russia in 1917. Her mother's politics were formative for Davidow. Her mother was a seamstress and became a leader in the International Ladies Garment Workers Union and sold The Daily Worker, a communist newspaper, door-to-door. When her father developed tuberculosis, Davidow gave up aspirations of becoming a lawyer and enrolled in nursing school at the Brooklyn Jewish Hospital to help provide for the family. She also found this a politicizing experience, both in caring for the poor and in unionization efforts at the hospital.

== Career ==
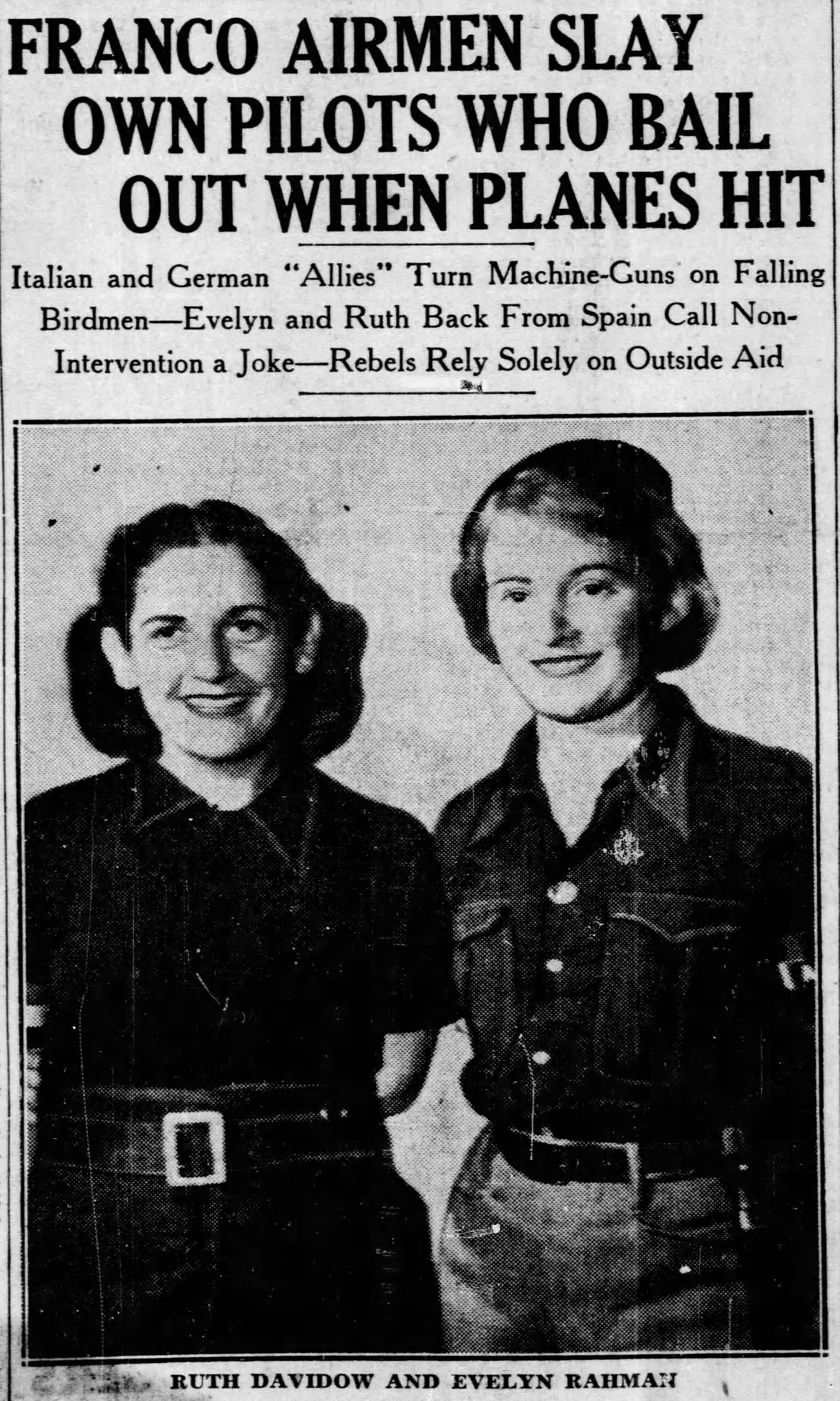
Davidow and Evelyn Hutchins upon returning to the United States, December 1938

When the Spanish Civil War began in 1936, Davidow volunteered to go in support of the Spanish Republic against the fascists as a nurse with the medical staff of the Abraham Lincoln Brigade, the American volunteer unit. This was in defiance of a travel ban from Franklin D. Roosevelt's then-isolationist administration. She arrived in June 1937, working in a frontline hospital during the Battle of the Ebro. She returned home in December 1938, and in 1939 she toured in the United States with another American nurse, Evelyn Hutchins Rahman, talking about their experiences in Spain.

Davidow married Fred Keller, a fellow Lincoln Brigade veteran, after the Spanish Civil War. They had one daughter, Joanie Keller Selznick.

She later moved to Cuba, serving as an aid worker from 1960 to 1962 following the revolution. She also worked in the American South in 1965 supporting the civil rights movement as part of the Medical Committee for Human Rights. During the Native American occupation of Alcatraz (1969 to 1971), Davidow was one of the only non-Native Americans allowed onto the island, providing medical care.

Davidow was featured in the film documentary The Good Fight: The Abraham Lincoln Brigade in the Spanish Civil War (1984).

In the 1980s, Davidow founded a clinic in San Francisco's Haight-Ashbury district to offer care to drug addicts.

Encouraged by her daughter, a filmmaker, Davidow also began making films as a form of activism in the 1980s. Her 21 films deal with a variety of topics in politics, health, and geriatrics.

== Honors and legacy ==
In 1996, the Spanish government awarded Davidow honorary citizenship for her nursing service during the civil war. She was profiled in the 1991 Academy Award-nominated documentary Forever Activists: Stories From the Veterans of the Abraham Lincoln Brigade by Judith Montell.

== Death ==
Davidow died on June 28, 1999, in San Francisco.
