= Mikhail Davydov (historian) =

Russian Historian

- Михаил Давыдов
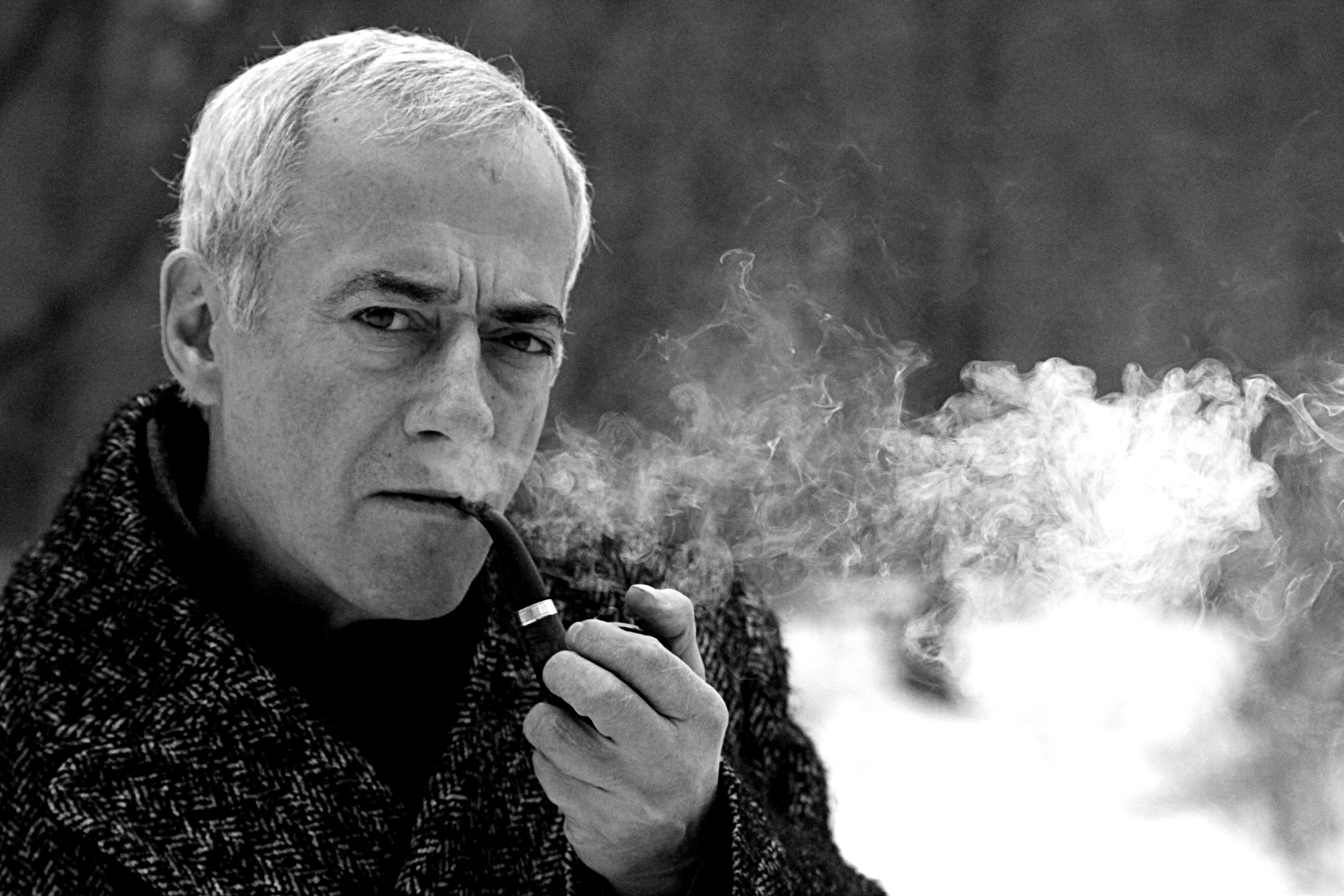
- Born: 1954 (age 71–72); Soviet Union
- Occupation: Historian

Mikhail Abramovich Davydov (Russian: Михаил Абрамович Давыдов; born 1954) is a Soviet and Russian historian, specialising in the field of Russian economic history. He is a Doctor of Historical Sciences since 2004 and a professor at the School of Historical Sciences of the Higher School of Economics.

== List of monographs ==
- Цена утопии. История российской модернизации [The Price of Utopia: The History of Russian Modernization] (in Russian). 2022. ISBN 978-5-4448-1838-1.
- Двадцать лет до Великой войны: Российская модернизация Витте-Столыпина [Twenty Years Before the Great War: Witte-Stolypin's Russian Modernization] (in Russian). 2016. ISBN 978-5-90670-504-4.
- Оппозиция его Величества [His Majesty's Opposition] (in Russian). 2007. ISBN 5-94663-197-7.
- Всероссийский рынок в конце XIX - начале XX вв. и железнодорожная статистика [All-Russian market in the late 19th - early 20th centuries and railway statistics] (in Russian). 2010. ISBN 978-5-91419-056-6.
- Теорема Столыпина [Stolypin's theorem] (in Russian). 2022. ISBN 978-5-00165-433-9.
