= Sergei Davydov (writer) =

Russian writer

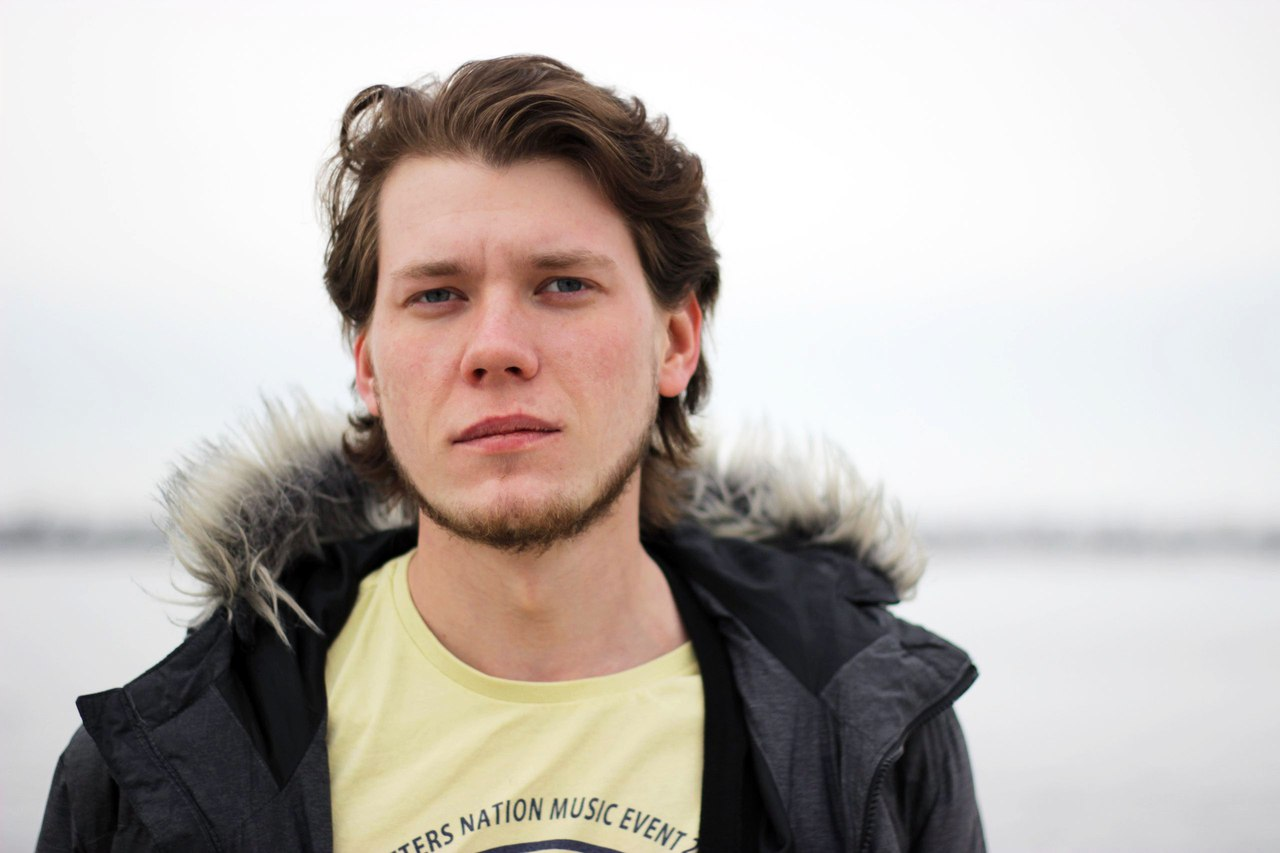
- Sergei Davydov in 2016
- Born: Sergey Igorevich Davydov; 15 June 1992 (age 34); Tolyatti, Samara Oblast, Russia
- Citizenship: Russian
- Education: Higher School of Economics
- Occupations: Writer; Playwright
- Writing career
- Language: Russian, English, German
- Years active: since 2012
- Period: Contemporary
- Genres: Novel; novella; short story; sketch; prose poem; play; script; libretto

Sergei Davydov (Russian: Сергей Игоревич Давыдов; born June 15, 1992, in Tolyatti, Russian Federation) is a Russian writer, playwright, and poet. He is best known for his plays "Border", "Republic", and the novel "Springfield", which has been named one of the most important texts in recent years in the Russian language.

== Biography ==
Sergei Davydov was born on June 15, 1992, in Tolyatti.

In 2014, he graduated from Samara State Aerospace University. In 2022, he completed his master's degree at the Higher School of Economics.

In 2012, Davydov's debut play "Lev Tolstoy, 49" was shortlisted for the International Playwrights' Contest "Eurasia". In 2014, he participated for the first time in the "Lyubimovka" Playwrights Festival.

In 2016, he collaborated with Andrey Stadnikov on the "Transsib" project at Dmitry Brusnikin's workshop at the Moscow Art Theatre School.

In 2017, he wrote a play about teenagers called "Brothers", the performance of which became the first documentary play in the North Caucasus. In 2020, he won the "Culmination. Play of the Year" award for his play "Republic" about collapse of the Soviet Union and civil war in Tajikistan.

In 2021, the play "Republic" was recognized by the expert council of the national award "Golden Mask" as one of the main theatrical events of the season.

In 2022, he publicly opposed Russia's military invasion of Ukraine and came out as gay. Following this, Sergei Davydov was forced to leave Russia due to repression. He currently lives in Germany.

In 2023, his novel "Springfield" about queer people in Russia was published by Freedom Letters. That same year, the collection "Five Plays About Freedom" was also released. In 2024, Davydov’s novel Springfield became one of the targets of Russia’s anti-LGBTQ campaign in the context of the invasion of Ukraine, when the Prosecutor General’s Office of Russia demanded that it be removed from the website of the Freedom Letters publishing house and that sales be stopped. Later, Roskomnadzor added the novel to the register of prohibited information. In 2025, the novel was shortlisted for the independent literary prize “Dar” (established on the initiative of Mikhail Shishkin). In 2026, the English translation of the novel by Reuben Woolley received the PEN Translates award from English PEN, while the French translation by Nicolas Stuyckens was included in the final selection of the Prix Pierre-François Caillé de la traduction.

More than 30 of Davydov's plays have been performed on stages in Moscow, Saint Petersburg, London, San Francisco, Tbilisi, Belgrade, Berlin, Los Angeles, and other cities.

Davydov's works have been translated into English, German, Spanish, Japanese, Italian, and other languages.

== Works ==
=== Selected Bibliography ===
- "Full United: Seven Plays About Youth." — T.: V. Smirnov Literary Agency, 2019. — 200 pages. ISBN 978-5-98147-137-7
- "Springfield." — Freedom Letters, 2023. — 132 pages. ISBN 978-0-9938202-3-6
- "Five Plays About Freedom." — Freedom Letters, 2023. — 212 pages. ISBN 978-1-998084-21-0
- "Five Plays About War." — Freedom Letters, 2024. — 204 pages. (editor and author of the foreword) ISBN 978-1-998265-34-3
- "Midwest" — Freedom Letters, 2026. — 160 pages. ISBN 978-1-80665-076-7

=== Selected Theatrical Works ===
- 2024 — "The Border", directed by Ray Hanna, Fiesta Hall, West Hollywood
- 2024 — "The Border", directed by Ray Hanna, Hollywood Fringe Festival, Los Angeles
- 2023 — "Let's Play", directed by Tim Tkachov, Jazz Union Space, Tbilisi
- 2023 — "Die Grenze", directed by Yuri Shekhvatov, ACUD theater, Berlin
- 2023 — "The Border", Pushkin House (as part of the international project 365: Rehearsed Reading of Three Anti-War Plays), London, San Francisco, Tbilisi, Belgrade, Berlin
- 2022 — "Ronaldo Will Never Catch Up with My Grandmother", directed by Nikita Betekhtin, Stanislavsky Electrotheatre
- 2021 — "Where Is My Home", directed by Kama Ginkas, Moscow Young Spectators' Theatre, performance based on the play "Republic"
- 2020 — "The Philistines", adaptation of Maxim Gorky's text, directed by Elizaveta Bondar, A.A. Bryantsev Youth Theatre, Saint Petersburg
- 2019 — "Kolya Against Everyone", directed by Y. Laikova, Center for Drama and Directing, Moscow
- 2017 — "Brothers", directed by N. Betekhtin, National Center for Contemporary Arts, Moscow
- 2016 — "Transsib", directed by D. Brusnikin, Y. Kvyatkovsky, S. Shchedrin, Moscow Art Theatre School
- 2016 — "Indirect Influences", directed by V. Lisovsky, Teatr.doc, Moscow

=== Filmography ===
- 2025 — “I have to run”, directed by Oleg Khristolyubsky (Germany, prize of the Lovers festival in Turin and Sehsüchte festival in Potsdam)
