= Dimitri Alexandrovich Obolensky =

Russian nobleman

Prince Dimitri Alexandrovich Obolensky
- Born: 19 March (old style)/ 31 March 1882
- Died: 27 April 1964 (aged 82)
- Occupations: Major landowner; Marshal of the nobility; Night watchman; Taxi driver
- Known for: Russian nobleman
- Spouses: Countess Helene Bobrinsky; Countess Maria Shuvalova; Natalya Feodorova

Prince Dimitri Alexandrovich Obolensky (19 March (old style) 1882 – 27 April 1964) was a Russian nobleman, landowner and marshal of the nobility who after the October Revolution and the Russian Civil War became a night watchman and a taxi driver in Paris. He wrote a memoir of his experiences.

== Background ==
Obolensky was descended from the 9th century Varangian chieftain Rurik, founder of the Rurik dynasty, and from Igor I, Svyatoslav I, and St Vladimir of Kiev, as well as from the 13th century St Michael of Chernigov.

The son of Prince Alexander Dimitrievich Obolensky (1847–1917), by his marriage to Countess Anna Alexandrovna Polovtzova (1862–1917), Obolensky was born at Saint Petersburg on 24 April 1882.

== Life ==
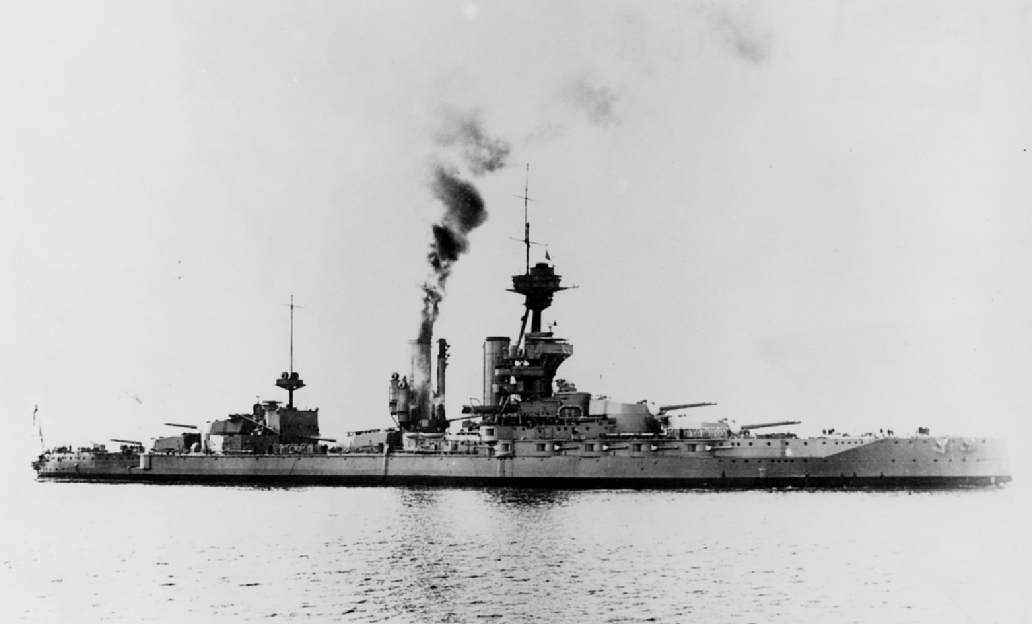
HMS Marlborough, Obolensky's escape route from the Bolsheviks in 1919

On 22 Sep 1905 Obolensky married firstly, in Berlin, Countess Helene Bobrinsky (1885–1937), daughter of Count Alexander Alexandrovich Bobrinsky. They had two sons and a daughter: Alexander, born 1906, Andrei (1907–1969), and Helena (1909–1978). Their son Andrei grew up to be a notable chess player.

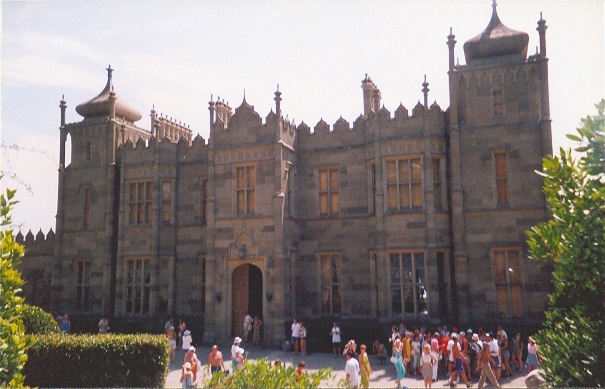
The Alupka Palace

As a landowner, Obolensky led "a country life reminiscent of Turgenev's tales" and as well as being a marshal of the nobility was a lover of nature, a patriot and an improver. When news came of the Austro-Hungarian monitor bombardment of the Serbian city of Belgrade beginning on 29 July 1914, Obolensky spoke stirringly to the peasants on his estate of the need for war, and they reacted enthusiastically. He later learned that his hearers had understood him to mean Belgorod near Kharkiv, which held the relics of the recently glorified Saint Ioasaph.

During World War I, Obolensky's marriage broke down and in 1916 it ended in a divorce. On 18 July 1917 he married secondly, in Moscow, Countess Maria Shuvalova (1894–1973), a daughter of Count Paul Pavlovich Shuvalov and Countess Alexandra Ilaryonovna Vorontzova-Dashkova. Three weeks later, on 7 August 1917, Obolensky's mother died in Moscow. The October Revolution began on 25 October (Old Style), or 7 November (New Style) with an armed insurrection in Petrograd. On 26 November Obolensky's father, who by then was at Essentuki, died there. However, Obolensky and his wife were still in Petrograd when their son Dimitri was born there on 19 March/1 April 1918.

Obolensky's new mother-in-law and her sister Sofka Demidova (1870–1953), were daughters of Count Hilarion Vorontsov-Dashkov (1837–1916), Minister of the Imperial Court under Alexander III and Viceroy of the Caucasus Viceroyalty to the last Tsar, Nicholas II, and both women were intimates of the Imperial family. His wife was also descended from Prince Michael Vorontsov (1782–1856), an earlier Viceroy of the Caucasus, for whom Edward Blore designed the Alupka Palace near Yalta in the Crimea. Some months after the October Revolution of 1917, the Obolenskys retreated from Petrograd to the Alupka palace. Early in 1919, during the Russian Civil War, and with Bolshevik armies approaching, he and his wife and children escaped from Russia on board the Royal Navy's HMS Marlborough, together with others who included the Dowager Empress Marie Feodorovna, the Grand Duke Nicholas, and Prince Felix Yusupov, the killer of Rasputin. Joining the large White Russian community in Paris, Obolensky became a night watchman and later a taxi driver. His "brief, unhappy marriage" quickly came to an end with a divorce in 1921. His second wife soon married Count Andrey Tolstoy, settling with him in Nice.

On 16 August 1923, in London, Obolensky married thirdly Natalya Feodorova (1894–1952), a young woman originally from Simbirsk. This marriage also ended ultimately in divorce, before Natalya's death in 1952.

Obolensky was somehow able to afford to send his son Dimitri to an English preparatory school, to the Lycée Pasteur, and to Trinity College, Cambridge, where he began a distinguished academic career which culminated in his becoming Professor of Russian and Balkan History at Oxford.

Obolensky wrote a memoir of his life in Imperial Russia, of which one writer said that "The humour and stoicism of the memoir remained with him through the vicissitudes which followed the October Revolution." He died at Cannes on 27 April 1964. His second wife settled in Oxford with their son Dimitri and died there on 16 June 1973.
