= Dimitri Obolensky =

Russian-British historian

- Дмитрий Оболенский
- Born: Prince Dmitri Dmitrievich Obolensky; 1 April 1918; Petrograd, Russian Soviet Republic
- Died: 23 December 2001 (aged 83); Burford, Oxfordshire, U.K.
- Citizenship: United Kingdom
- Awards: Knights Bachelor

Academic background
- Education: Trinity College, Cambridge (1937–42)
- Thesis: The Bogomils: A Study in Balkan Neo-Manichaeism (1942)
- Doctoral advisor: Elizabeth Hill
- Influences: Francis Dvornik, Ihor Ševčenko, John Meyendorff

Academic work
- Institutions: Trinity College, Cambridge (1942–49); Christ Church, Oxford (1949–85)
- Doctoral students: Anthony Bryer, Michael Angold, James Howard-Johnston, Jonathan Shepard, Simon Franklin
- Notable works: The Byzantine Commonwealth: Eastern Europe, 500–1453
- Notable ideas: Byzantine commonwealth

Dimitri Dimitrievich Obolensky FBA FSA (Russian: Дмитрий Дмитриевич Оболенский; 1 April [O.S. 19 March] 1918 – 23 December 2001) was a Russian-British historian who was Professor of Russian and Balkan History at the University of Oxford and the author of various historical works.

== Biography ==
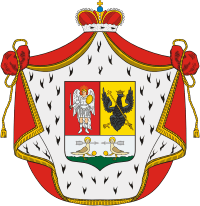

Dimitri Dimitrievich Obolensky was born in the Russian Soviet Republic on 1 April 1918 in Petrograd, the son of the ex-Knyaz Dimitri Alexandrovich Obolensky (1882–1964) and ex-Countess Maria (Shuvalova) (1894–1973). His family was alleged to have descended from Rurik, Igor, Svyatoslav, St Vladimir of Kiev, St Michael of Chernigov, and Prince Mikhail Semyonovich Vorontsov: however, as one of his students has written, "he was a sober enough scholar to know that Rurik may not actually have existed."

He spent his first years at the Vorontsov Palace (built by one of his ancestors) at Alupka, in Crimea. His family was evacuated from Russia in a British warship.

He was educated in Britain at Lynchmere Preparatory School, Eastbourne, and in France at the Lycée Pasteur in Neuilly-sur-Seine, before going up to Trinity College, Cambridge, where he distinguished himself with a Blue for lawn tennis and graduated in 1940.

Obolensky became a distinguished academic. He was elected a Fellow of Trinity College (1942–1948, Honorary Fellow 1991–2001) and Lecturer in Slavonic Studies, University of Cambridge (1946–1948). He became a British national in 1948.

From 1949 to 1961, Obolensky was Reader in Russian and Balkan Medieval History at the University of Oxford (1949–1961) and subsequently Professor of Russian and Balkan History (1961–1985, Emeritus 1985–2001). He was also a Student of Christ Church, Oxford (1950–1985, Emeritus 1985–2001). He later became Vice-President of the Keston Institute, Oxford.

Obolensky's most enduring achievement was The Byzantine Commonwealth (1971), a large-scale synthesis on the cultural influence of the Eastern Roman Empire. Other major studies include The Bogomils: a study in Balkan neo-Manichaeism (1946) and Six Byzantine Portraits (1988).

Obolensky was elected a Fellow of the British Academy (1974, Vice-President 1983–85), as well as Fellow of the Society of Antiquaries, and appointed a Knight Bachelor (1984). He was a member of the Athenaeum Club. In 1988, he returned to Russia as a delegate to the Sobor or Council of the Russian Orthodox Church convoked to celebrate the 1,000th anniversary of the conversion of Russia to Christianity. He was elected to the American Philosophical Society in 1990.

He married Elisabeth Lopukhin in 1947; they had no children, and the marriage was dissolved in 1989.

He died on 23 December 2001 at Burford in Oxfordshire. His memorial service was held in Christ Church Cathedral, Oxford, and he is buried at Wolvercote Cemetery.

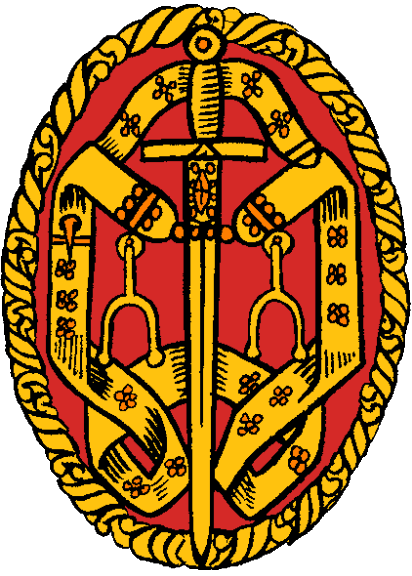

== Selected works ==
- Obolensky, Dimitri (1971). Byzantium and the Slavs: Collected Studies. London: Variorum Reprints. ISBN 978-0-902089-14-3.
- Obolensky, Dimitri (1974) [1971]. The Byzantine Commonwealth: Eastern Europe, 500-1453. London: Cardinal. ISBN 9780351176449.
- Obolensky, Dimitri (1982). The Byzantine Inheritance of Eastern Europe. London: Variorum Reprints. ISBN 9780860781028.
- Obolensky, Dimitri (1988). Six Byzantine Portraits. Clarendon Press. ISBN 9780198219514.
- Obolensky, Dimitri (2004) [1948]. The Bogomils: A Study in Balkan Neo-Manichaeism. Cambridge University Press. ISBN 9780521607636.
- Obolensky, Dimitri (1971). Bread of Exile: A Russian Family. Harvill Press. ISBN 1-86046-511-0.
