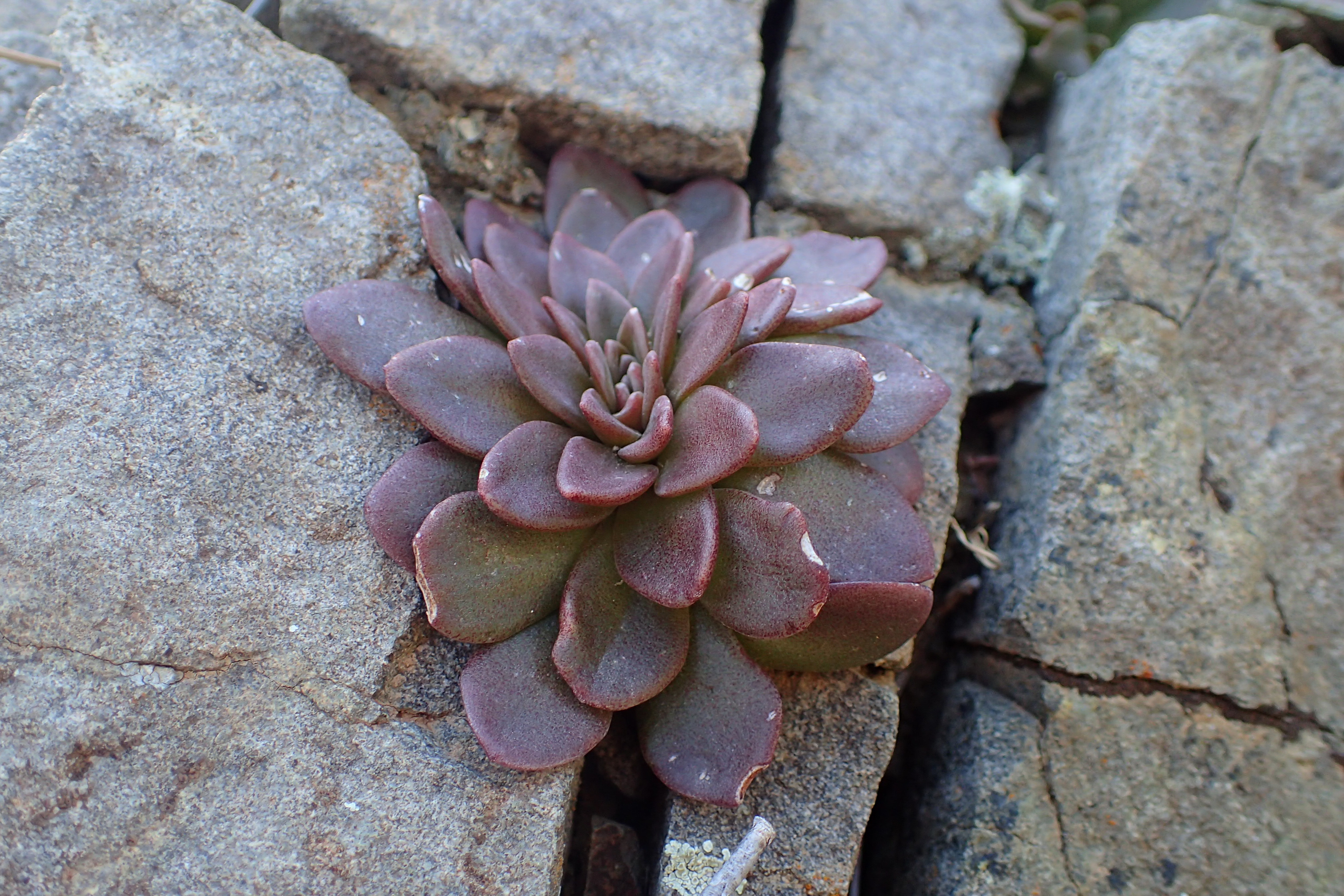

Scientific classification
- Kingdom: Plantae
- Clade: Tracheophytes
- Clade: Angiosperms
- Clade: Eudicots
- Order: Saxifragales
- Family: Crassulaceae
- Genus: Sedum
- Species: S. cyprium

Binomial name
- Sedum cyprium A.K.Jacks. & Turrill

= Sedum cyprium =

Species of succulent

Sedum cyprium, the Cyprus stonecrop, is an erect, monocarpic, succulent herb in the family Crassulaceae. The species is distinguished by its small brownish-red flowers and its ability to grow in harsh, rocky environments. It is considered relatively rare, being found only within a limited altitudinal range in Cyprus's Troodos Mountains where it has adapted to survive in shallow, free-draining substrates of weathered gabbro and schist. During summer heat, the plant often develops a distinct bronze-red colouration as a drought-resistance mechanism.

== Description ==
Sedum cyprium is a small, upright stonecrop that usually completes its life cycle in one or two years. Mature plants stand 7–33 cm tall on a short, thickened root-stock about a centimetre wide. At the base they form a tight rosette, up to 9 cm across, of thick, spatula-shaped leaves that are 2.4–5 cm long and 0.5–1.2 cm wide; these leaves are smooth, fleshy and rounded at the tip but taper gradually toward the stalk. Higher up the stem the leaves become progressively smaller (4–7 mm long), elliptic to narrowly obovate, and many are edged with minute, sticky glandular hairs that give the surface a slightly tacky feel; most of these upper leaves are shed as the inflorescence develops.

The flowering stem carries a slender, somewhat sticky panicle made up of overlapping cymes (small, repeatedly branched clusters). This inflorescence is 5–22 cm long and at most 4.5 cm wide at the base, giving it a narrow cylindrical to pyramidal outline. Each tiny flower has a five-lobed calyx whose lance-shaped teeth are only about a millimetre long and is surrounded by equally small, dull brownish-red petals 2.5–3 mm in length. Ten stamens with short, sometimes downy filaments surround the ovary. After pollination the plant produces erect, reddish-brown seed capsules (follicles) roughly 3 mm long; the persistent styles are at least twice this length. The seeds themselves are minute (about 0.5 mm) and elongated-egg-shaped, marked with fine red streaks. Field collections show that the species flowers from late June into July, when plants growing on sun-baked rocks can turn a striking bronze-red before setting seed.

== Habitat and distribution ==
Sedum cyprium is a narrow Cypriot endemic confined to the central Troodos Mountains. All confirmed records come from a clutch of localities such as Kryos Potamos gorge, Foini, Kokkinovouno, Pedoulas and the southern flanks of Mount Olympus. Most collections occur at elevations between about 850 m and 1,500 m; only isolated plants have been noted a little higher, on north-facing crags around 1,650 m. No populations are known from the limestone Kyrenia range or the lowland igneous hills that skirt the island's coast.

Within this altitudinal window the species occupies extremely shallow, free-draining substrates. It threads its roots into narrow fissures of weathered gabbro and schist, settles on sun-baked terraces of angular scree, or perches on steep, north- or east-facing clifflets where seasonal runoff keeps crevices just moist enough for germination. Sparse pines and junipers may offer dappled shade, but most colonies occur on largely open rock where plants tolerate intense summer heat by turning bronze-red and shrinking the leaf rosette. Occasional individuals also appear on stony banks beside dry streambeds and on abandoned terracing, provided the soil remains thin, acidic and fast-draining.

== Taxonomy ==
Sedum cyprium belongs to the stonecrop family, Crassulaceae. It was formally described in 1939 by the British botanists Arthur K. Jackson and William Bertram Turrill, who based the name on collections from the southern flank of the Troodos Mountains. Their Latin diagnosis placed the new taxon within Sedum sect. Cyprosedum and emphasised its small, brown-red flowers and glabrous (smooth and hairless) basal leaves. They selected a gathering made by H.G. Kennedy on 16 June 1937, high above the Kryos Potamos gorge, as the type material. The specific epithet honours Cyprus, where the plant was first collected.
