= Troodos Mountains =

Mountain range in Cyprus

Troodos
- Troödos
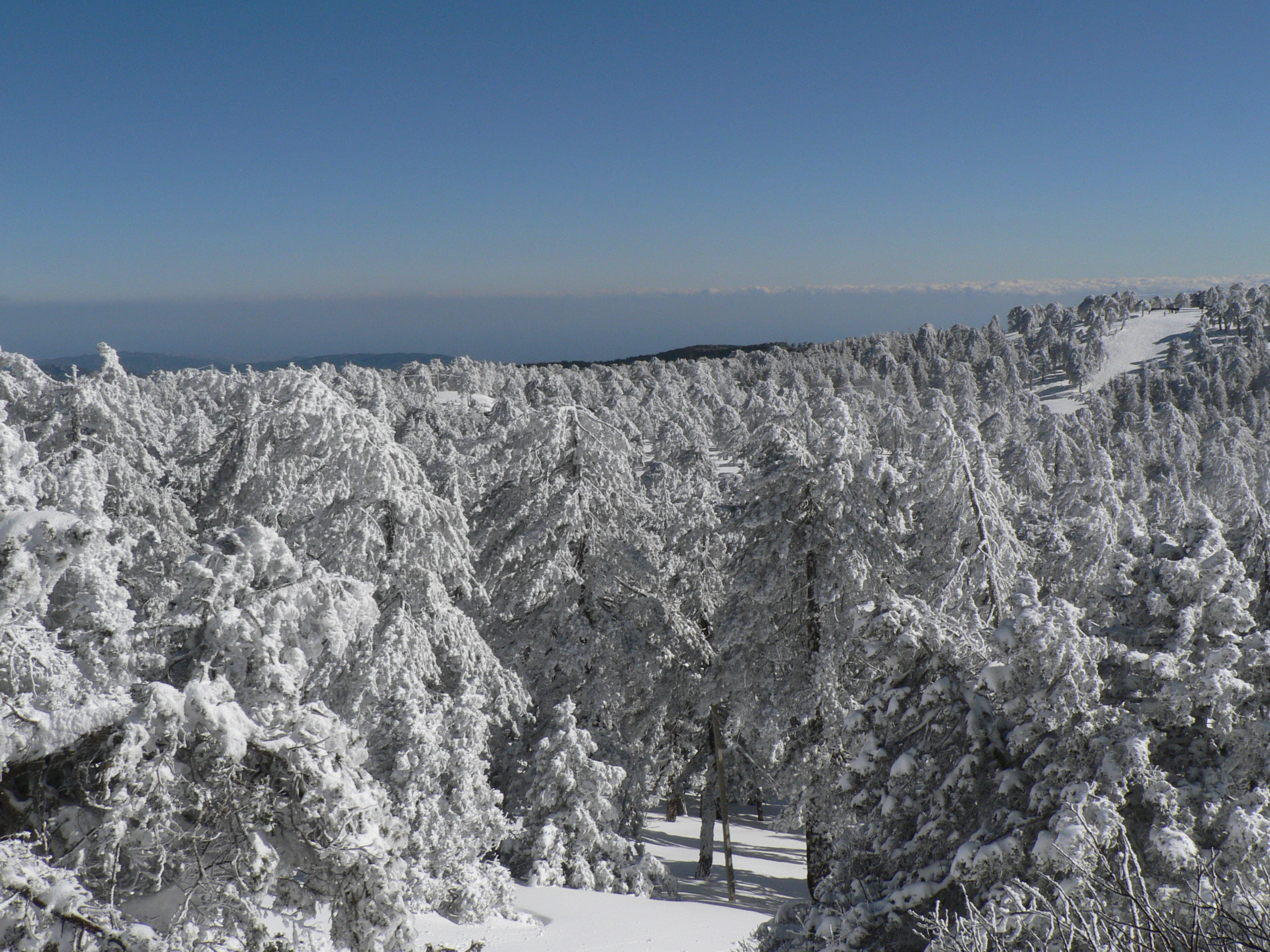
- Trees of Mount Olympus

Highest point
- Peak: Mount Olympus
- Elevation: 1,952 m (6,404 ft)
- Coordinates: 34°55′N 32°50′E

Naming
- Native name: Τρόοδος (Greek); Trodos Dağları (Turkish)

Geography
- Country: Cyprus

Troodos or Trodos (Note: Greek: Τρόοδος [ˈtɾo.oðos]; Turkish: Trodos Dağları ['tɾo.dos]) is the largest mountain range in Cyprus, located roughly in the centre of the island. Its highest peak is Mount Olympus – also known in Greek as Χιονίστρα (Hionistra) - at 1,952 metres (6,404 ft).

Covering a third of Cyprus's area, the Troodos mountain range stretches across most of the western side of the island. The mountains form a significant rain shadow on the island. There are many mountain resorts, Byzantine monasteries, and churches on the peaks, as well as villages nestling in its valleys and clinging to terraced hillsides. The area has been known since antiquity for its mines, which for centuries supplied copper to the entire Mediterranean. During the Byzantine period it became a centre of Byzantine art, as churches and monasteries were built in the mountains, away from the threatened coastline.

The mountains are home to Troodos Station, a listening post for both the American National Security Agency and the British GCHQ.

The name Troodos probably comes from one of two sources: either τρία + ὁδός (tría + hodós), referring to the three roads that lead to the mountain, or τό + ὄρος + Ἄδος (to + oro + Ados), meaning the mountains of Adonis.

It has many endemic plants and animals, including the Cyprus cedar.

== Geology ==
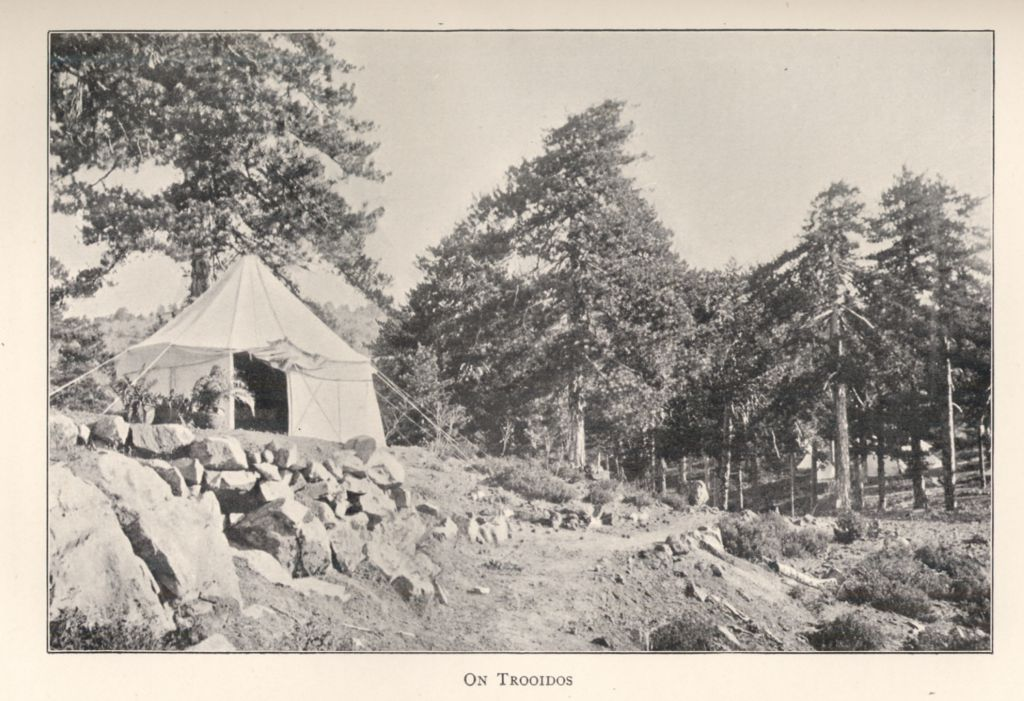
A campsite in Troodos in 1900

The Troodos Mountains are known for containing an undisturbed ophiolite sequence, the Troodos Ophiolite. The range rose slowly from the sea as a result of the collision between the African and European tectonic plates, a process that eventually formed the island of Cyprus. As this process slowed and nearly ceased, the rock formations remained largely intact, while subsequent erosion exposed the former magma chamber beneath the mountains, revealing intact rocks and petrified pillow lava formed millions of years ago - an excellent example of ophiolite stratigraphy. The observations of the Troodos ophiolite by Ian Graham Gass and co-workers were among the pieces of evidence that led to the theory of seafloor spreading. A detailed descriptive geological survey of Troodos was published in 1959. Although it predates the modern theory of plate tectonics, it provides exhaustive descriptions of rocks and structures.

== Climate ==
Like the rest of Cyprus, the climate is Mediterranean but it has somewhat greater diurnal ranges in temperature than coastal areas. For example, at Prodromos, daily mean temperatures are around 4 °C (39 °F) in January and 23 °C (73 °F) in July.

Climate data for Prodromos in Troodos Mountains, elevation: 1380 m (Satellite view)
Month	Jan	Feb	Mar	Apr	May	Jun	Jul	Aug	Sep	Oct	Nov	Dec	Year
Mean maximum °C (°F)	13.3 (55.9)	13.9 (57.0)	18.5 (65.3)	24.7 (76.5)	27.9 (82.2)	30.6 (87.1)	32.2 (90.0)	32.2 (90.0)	30.2 (86.4)	26.6 (79.9)	20.1 (68.2)	14.3 (57.7)	32.2 (90.0)
Mean daily maximum °C (°F)	6.3 (43.3)	6.6 (43.9)	10.3 (50.5)	15.1 (59.2)	20.5 (68.9)	25.0 (77.0)	28.1 (82.6)	27.9 (82.2)	24.4 (75.9)	19.6 (67.3)	12.8 (55.0)	8.0 (46.4)	17.1 (62.8)
Daily mean °C (°F)	3.5 (38.3)	3.5 (38.3)	6.6 (43.9)	10.7 (51.3)	15.8 (60.4)	20.1 (68.2)	23.3 (73.9)	23.1 (73.6)	19.6 (67.3)	15.4 (59.7)	9.5 (49.1)	5.3 (41.5)	13.0 (55.4)
Mean daily minimum °C (°F)	0.7 (33.3)	0.3 (32.5)	2.8 (37.0)	6.3 (43.3)	11.1 (52.0)	15.2 (59.4)	18.4 (65.1)	18.2 (64.8)	14.9 (58.8)	11.3 (52.3)	6.2 (43.2)	2.5 (36.5)	9.0 (48.2)
Mean minimum °C (°F)	−4.5 (23.9)	−5.2 (22.6)	−2.6 (27.3)	0.5 (32.9)	4.7 (40.5)	9.2 (48.6)	13.5 (56.3)	14.0 (57.2)	10.1 (50.2)	5.4 (41.7)	0.1 (32.2)	−2.8 (27.0)	−5.2 (22.6)
Average precipitation mm (inches)	133.4 (5.25)	123.6 (4.87)	82.3 (3.24)	56.9 (2.24)	26.0 (1.02)	40.0 (1.57)	12.1 (0.48)	10.0 (0.39)	9.5 (0.37)	24.0 (0.94)	102.5 (4.04)	169.7 (6.68)	790.1 (31.11)
Average precipitation days (≥ 1 mm)	12.4	11.2	9.8	6.7	3.7	2.1	0.7	0.7	1.4	3.5	7.4	11.2	70.7
Mean monthly sunshine hours	130.2	150.8	195.3	231.0	275.9	315.0	328.6	310.0	255.0	220.1	165.0	136.4	2,713.3
Source: Meteorological Service (Cyprus)

== Flora and fauna ==
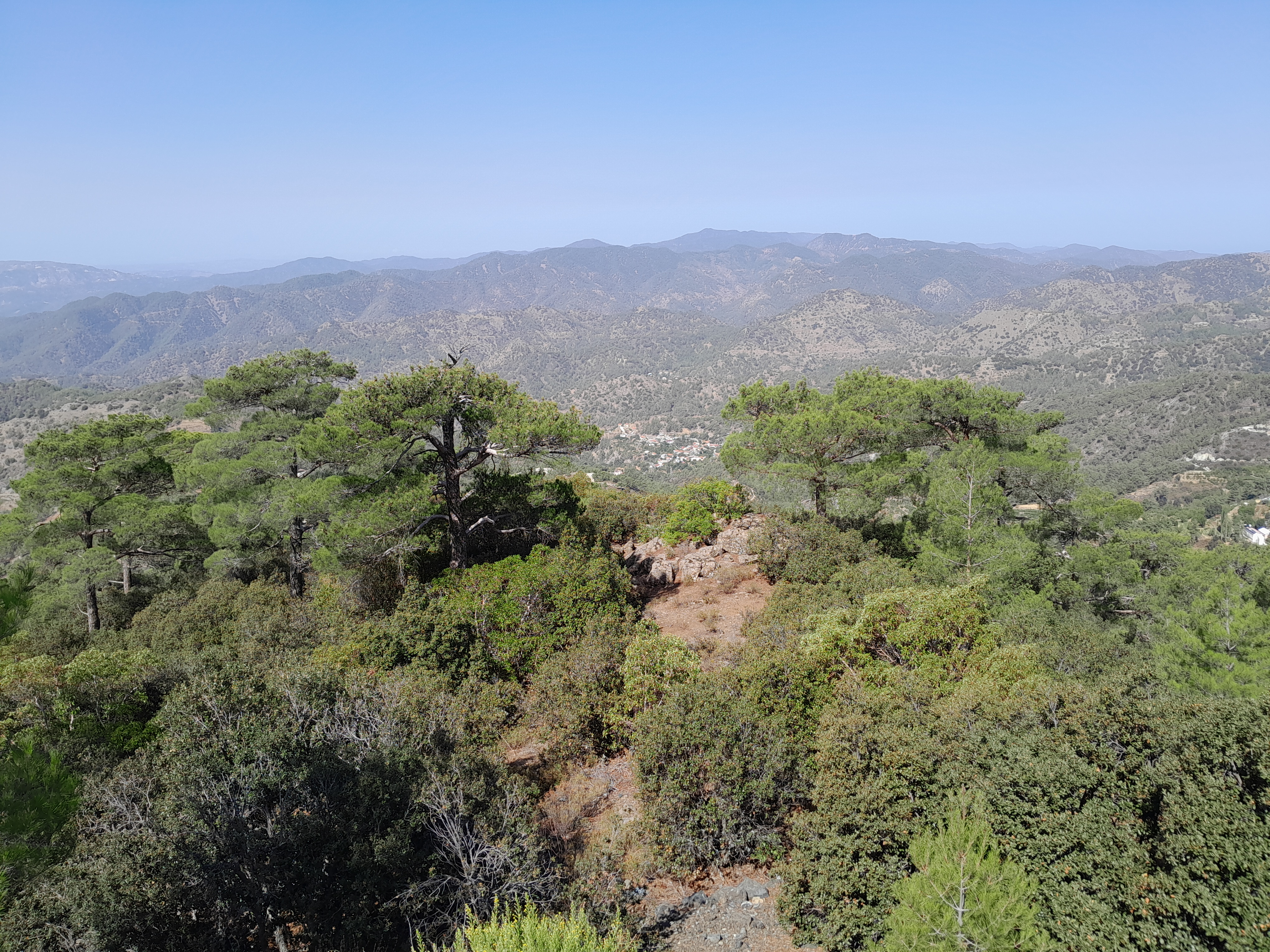
Forests of Troodos Mountains

The most ubiquitous trees in the Troodos mountains are the Turkish pine (Pinus brutia) and the golden oak (Quercus alnifolia). Some plants of the Olea, Rhus and Rosa genera populate the mountains, in particular Crataegus azarolus, Crataegus monogyna, Rhus coriaria and Rosa canina.

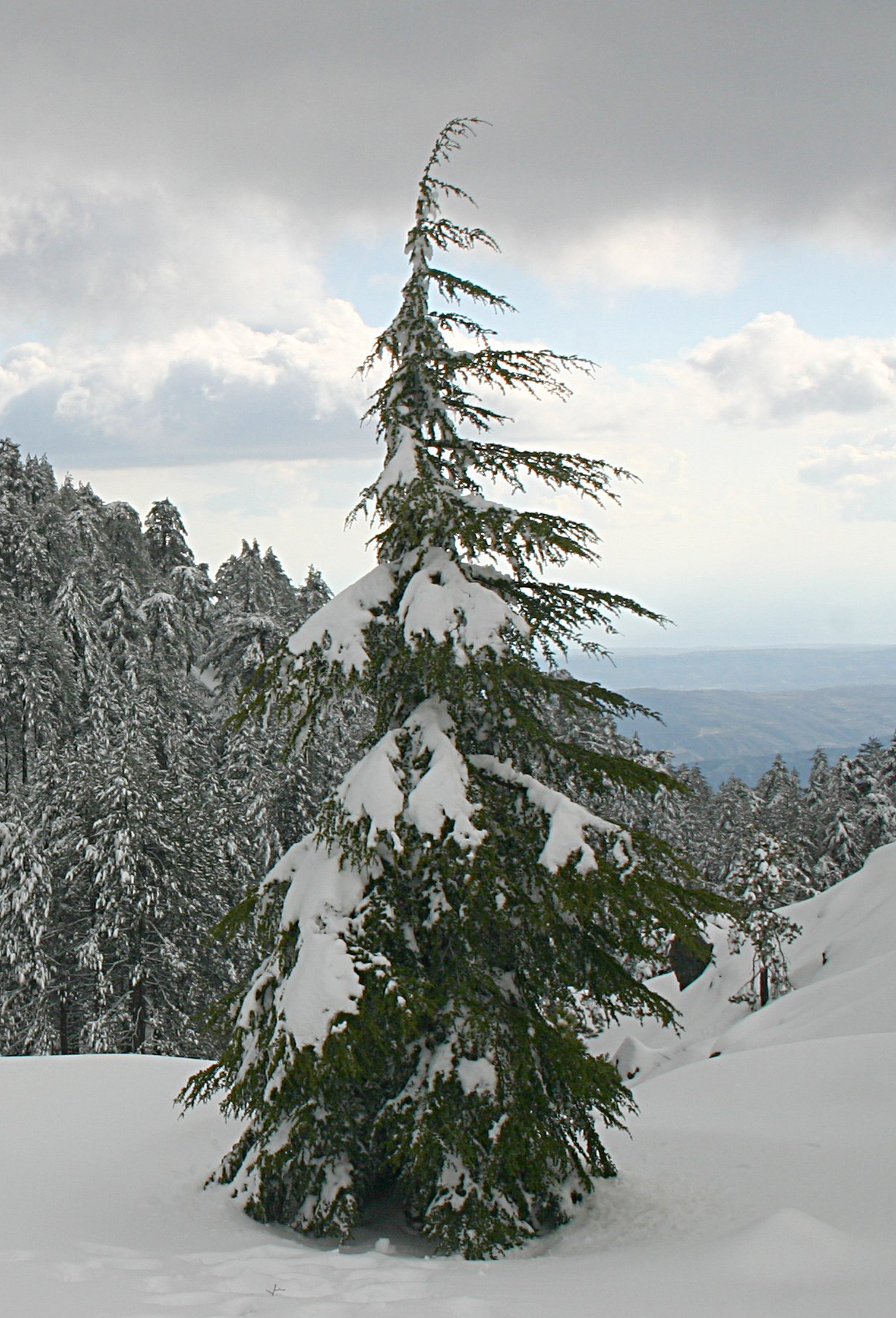
C. libani subsp. brevifolia at 1,700 m (5,600 ft) altitude

At higher altitudes, forests dominated by Anatolian black pine (Pinus nigra ssp. Pallasiana) grow, along with several Juniperus species (J. excelsa, J. foetidissima and J. oxycedrus). The common whitebeam (Sorbus aria) also grows there, together with the endemic shrubs Rosa chionistrae and Berberis cretica. The Cyprus cedar (Cedrus libani subsp. brevifolia) occurs at the highest peaks.

Chief among the fauna is the endangered Cyprus mouflon (Ovis gmelini ophion). The venomous Cypriot blunt-nosed viper (Macrovipera lebetina lebentina) is present in the mountains, as well as a rich bird population, including the common raven (Corvus corax), Bonelli's eagle (Hieraaetus fasciatus), Red Crossbill (Loxia curvirostra) and the Eurasian Griffon Vulture (Gyps fulvus).

== Churches ==
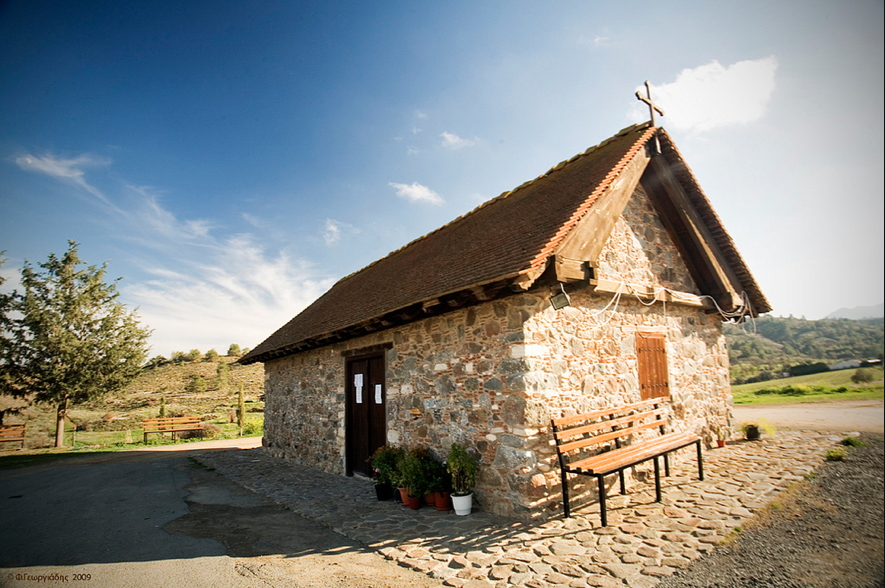
Chapel of the Saint Mary near Klirou village

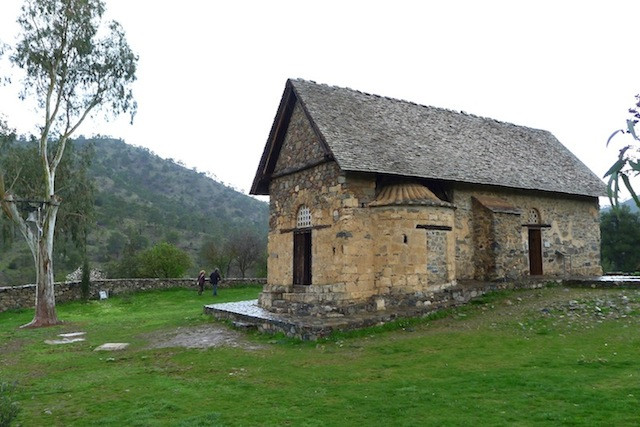
Panagia Forviothissa in Asinou village

The region is known for its many Byzantine churches and monasteries, richly decorated with murals, of which the Kykkos monastery is the richest and most famous. Nine churches and one monastery in Troodos together form a World Heritage Site, originally inscribed on the World Heritage List by UNESCO in 1985. The nine Byzantine churches are:

- Stavros tou Agiasmati
- Panagia tou Araka
- Timiou Stavrou at Pelendri
- Agios Nikolaos tis Stegis
- Panagia Podithou
- Assinou
- Agios Ioannis Lampadistis at Kalopanagiotis
- Panagia tou Moutoula
- Archangel Michael at Pedoulas
- Transfiguration of the Saviour Palaichori
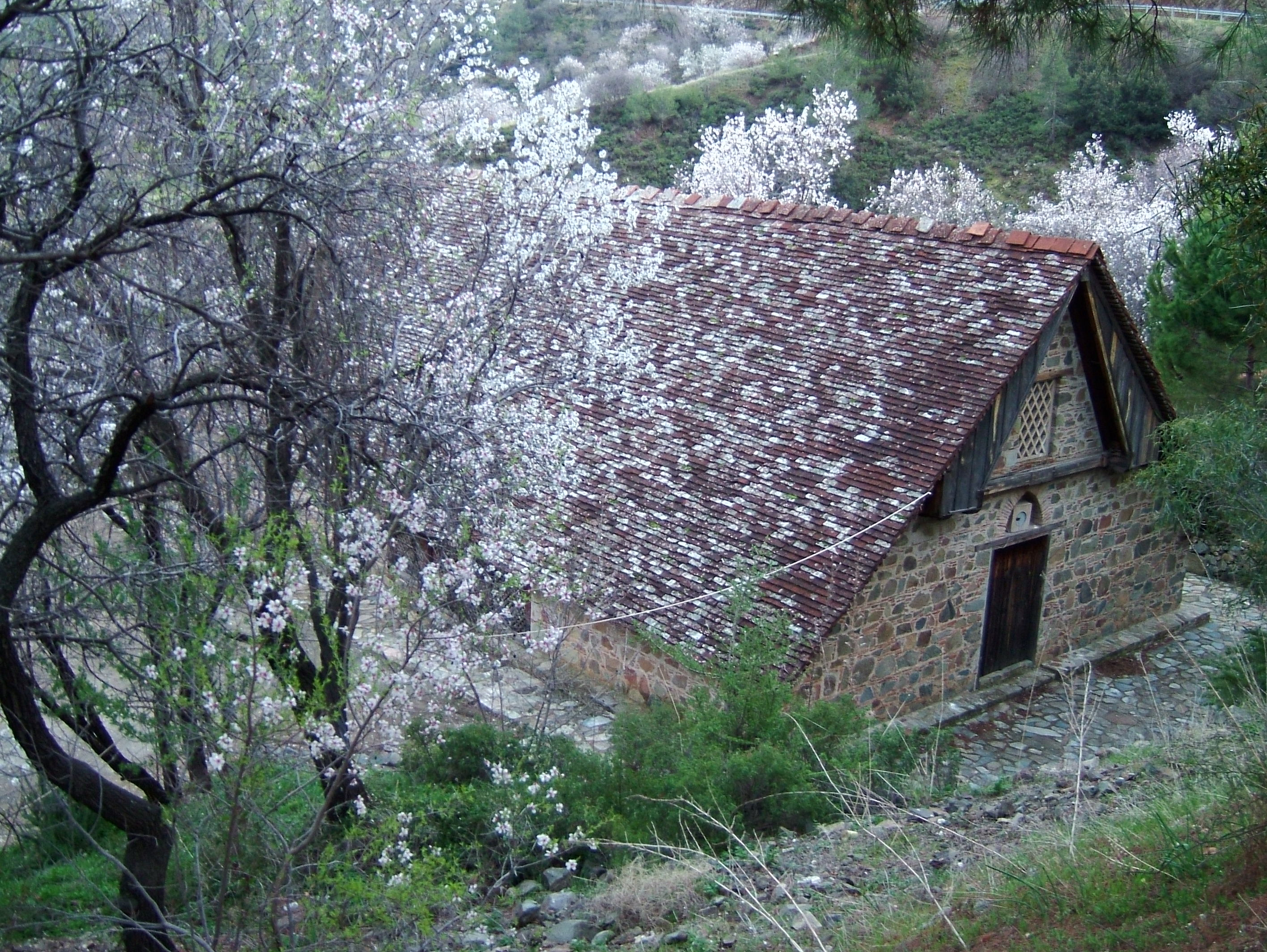
Church in spring

== Selected villages ==
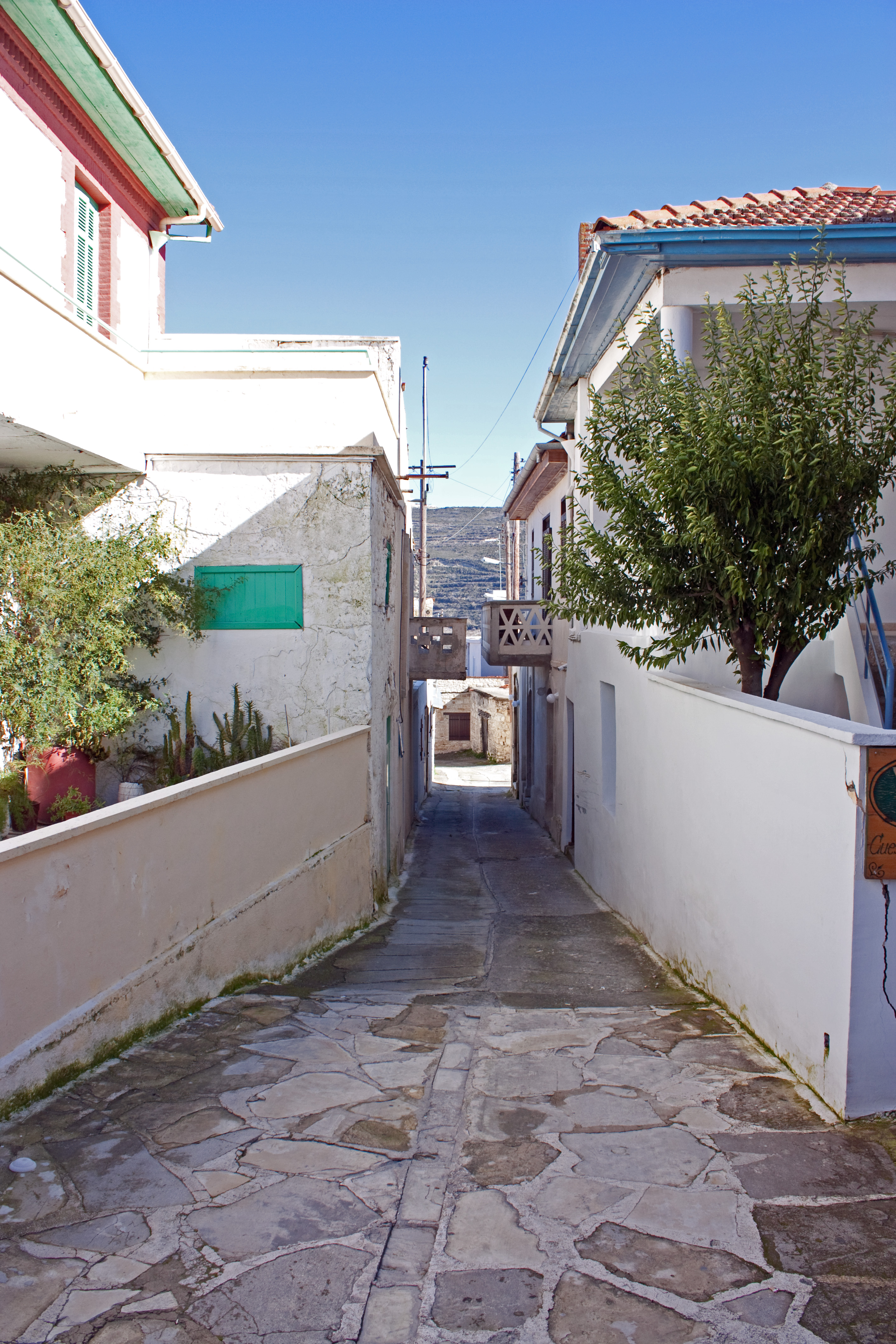
Omodos

- Agros
- Agios Epifanios Oreinis
- Arsos
- Dora
- Evrychou
- Farmakas
- Fikardou
- Galata
- Kakopetria
- Kalopanagiotis
- Koilani
- Kouka
- Kourdali
- Kyperounta
- Lania
- Louvaras
- Malia
- Marathassa Valley
- Moutoullas
- Omodos
- Pachna
- Palaichori Oreinis
- Pedoulas
- Pelendri
- Phini
- Platres
- Prastio
- Prodromos
- Spilia
- Vasa Koilaniou

== Gallery ==
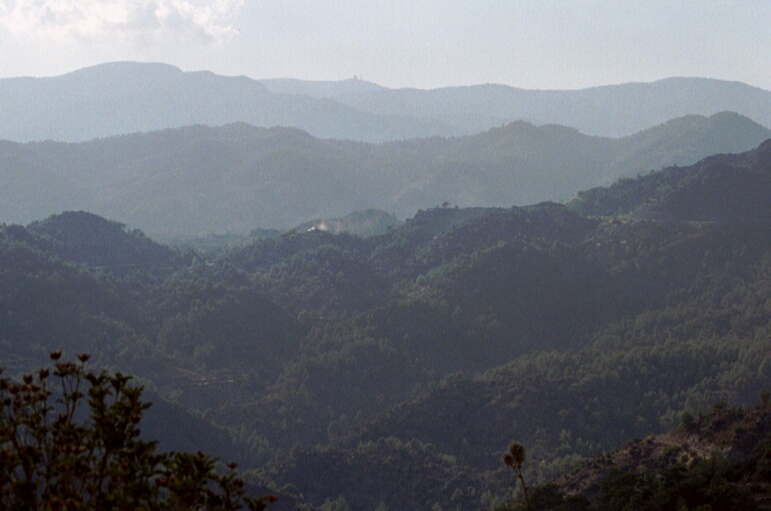
Troodos Mountains

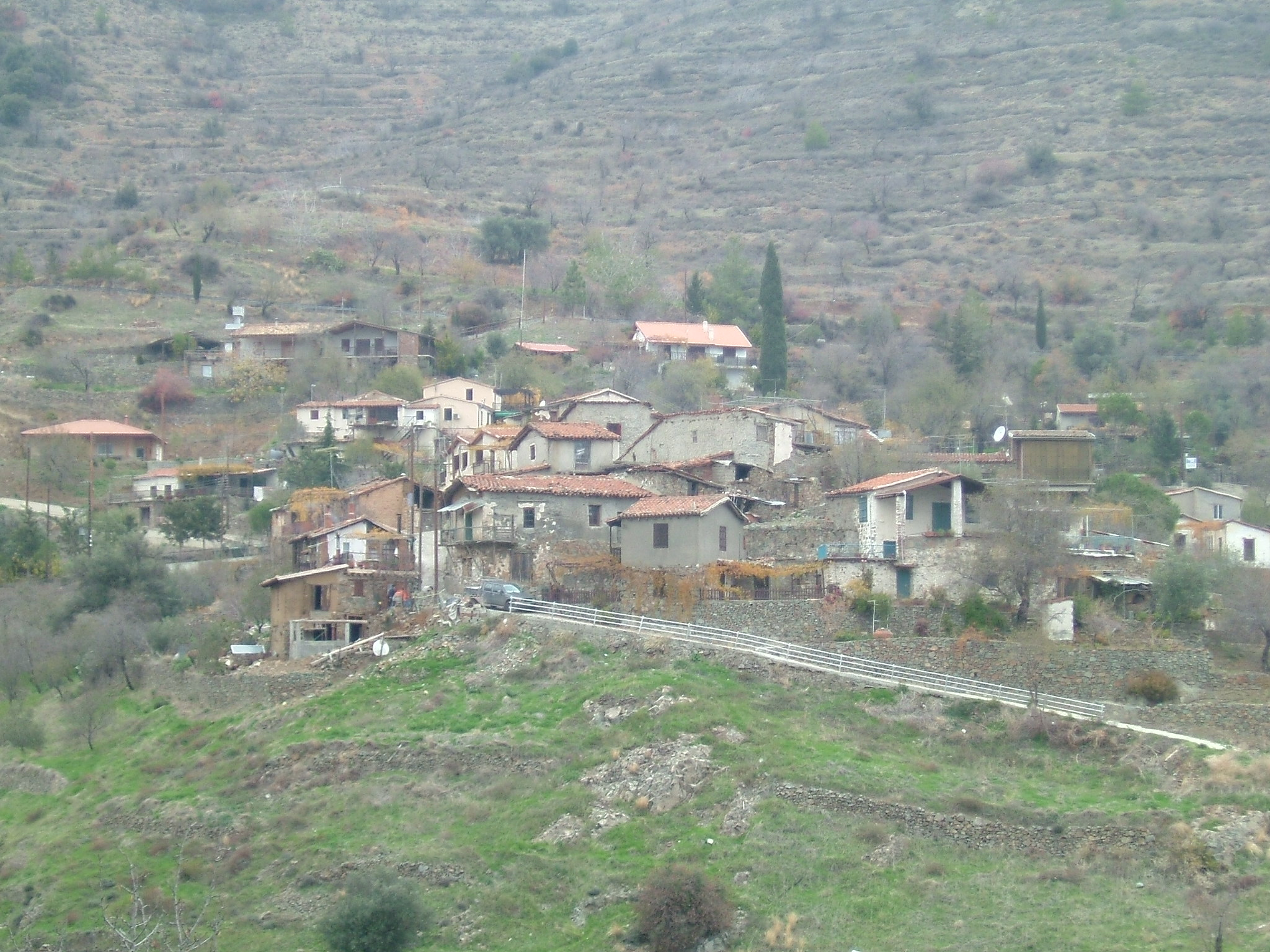
Lazanias village

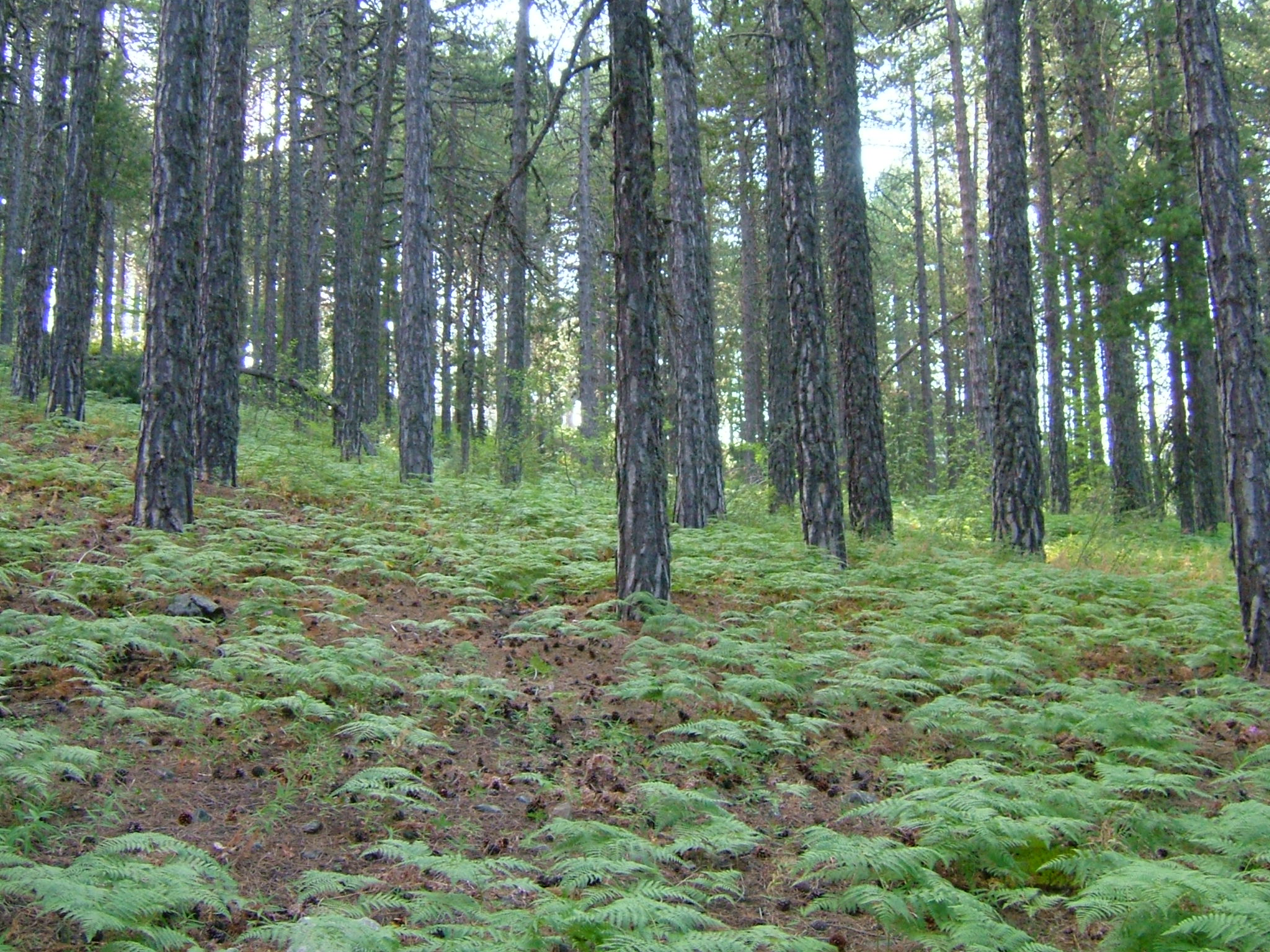
Troodos black pines are 3,000 years old

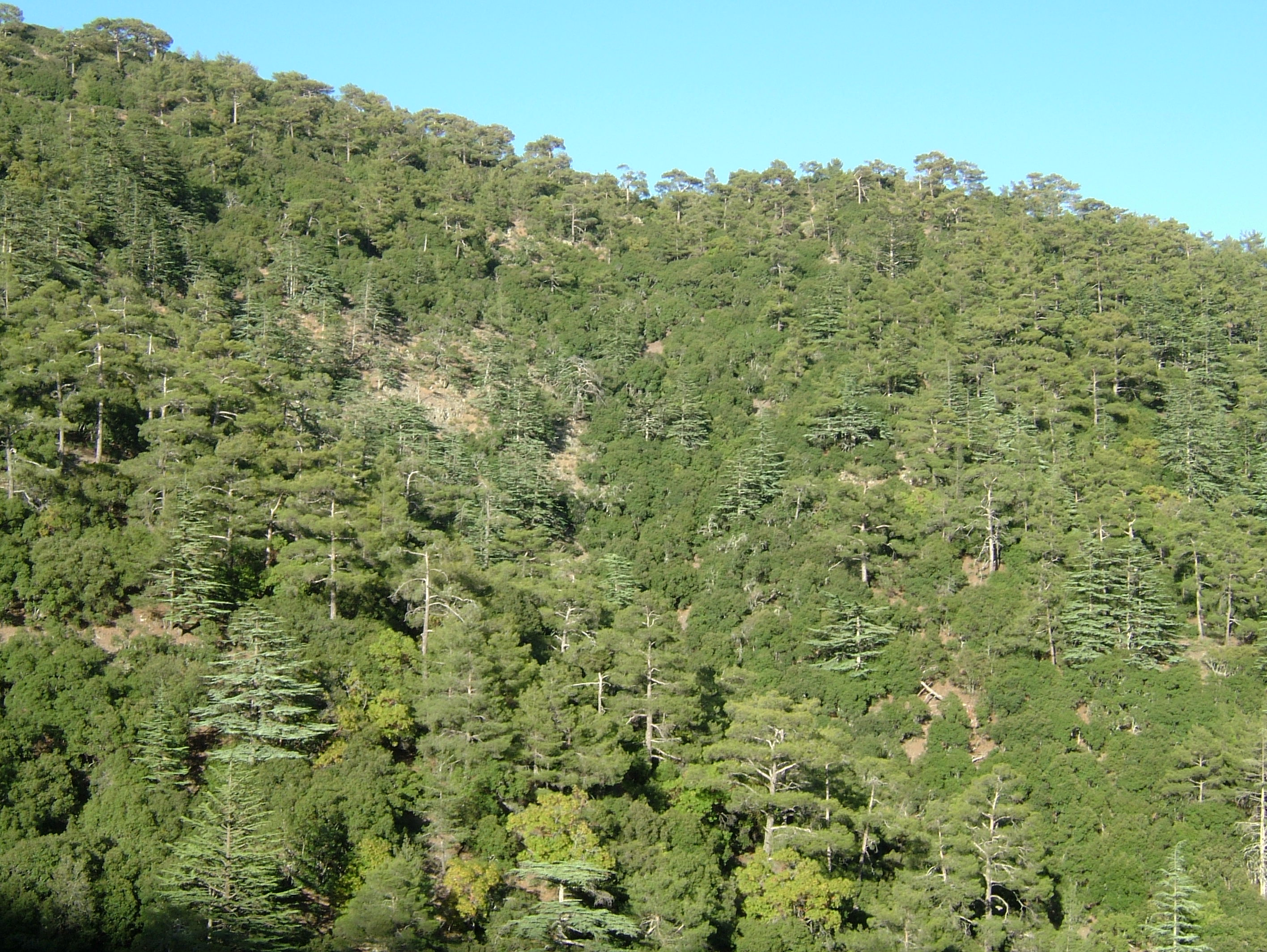
Forests in Troodos Mountains

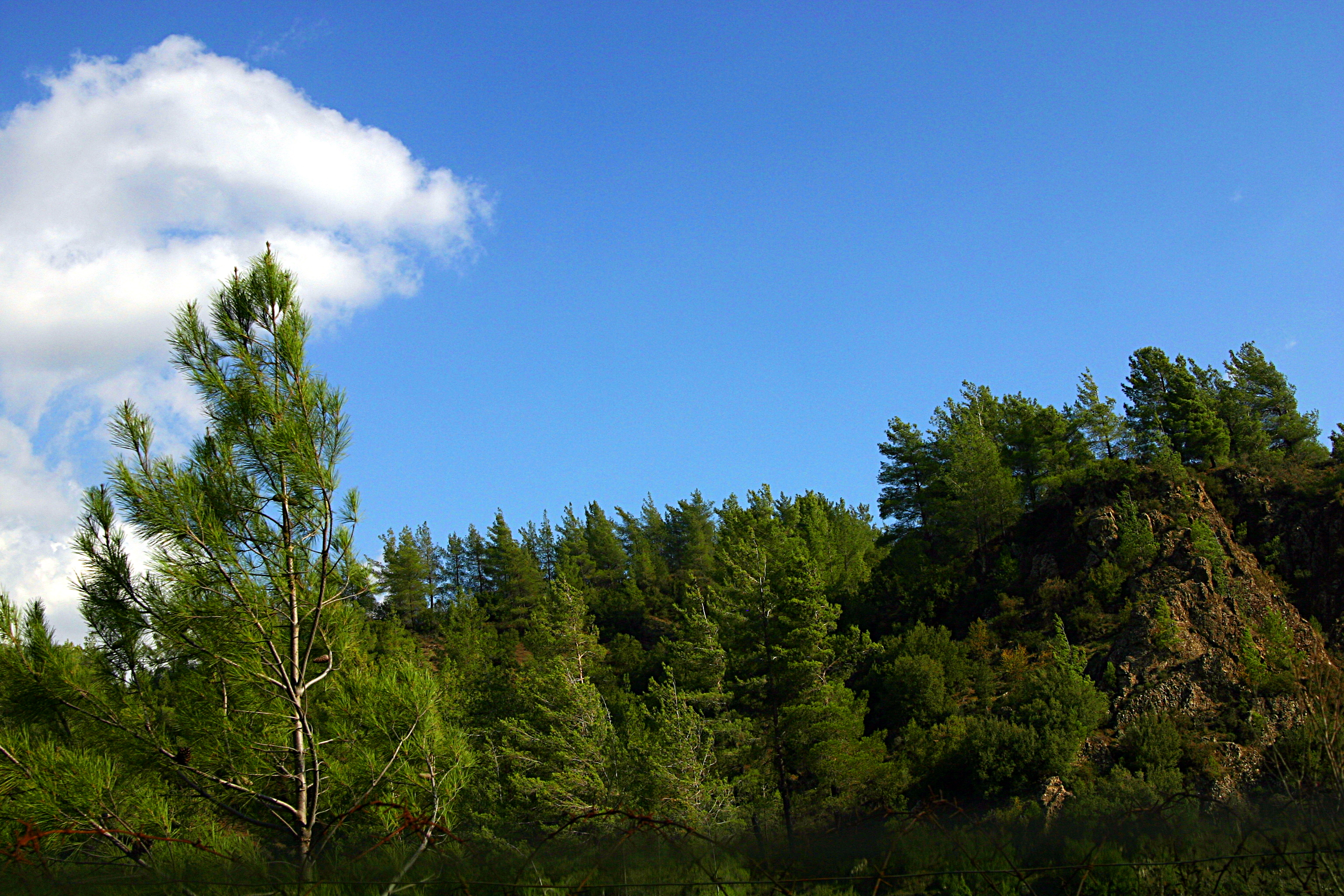
Pinus brutia, foothills of Troodos Mountains

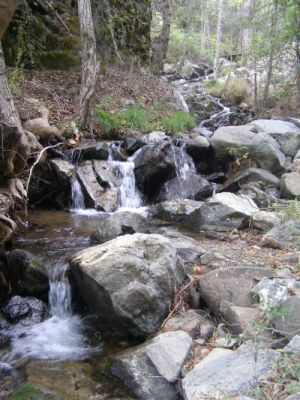
River tributary in Troodos

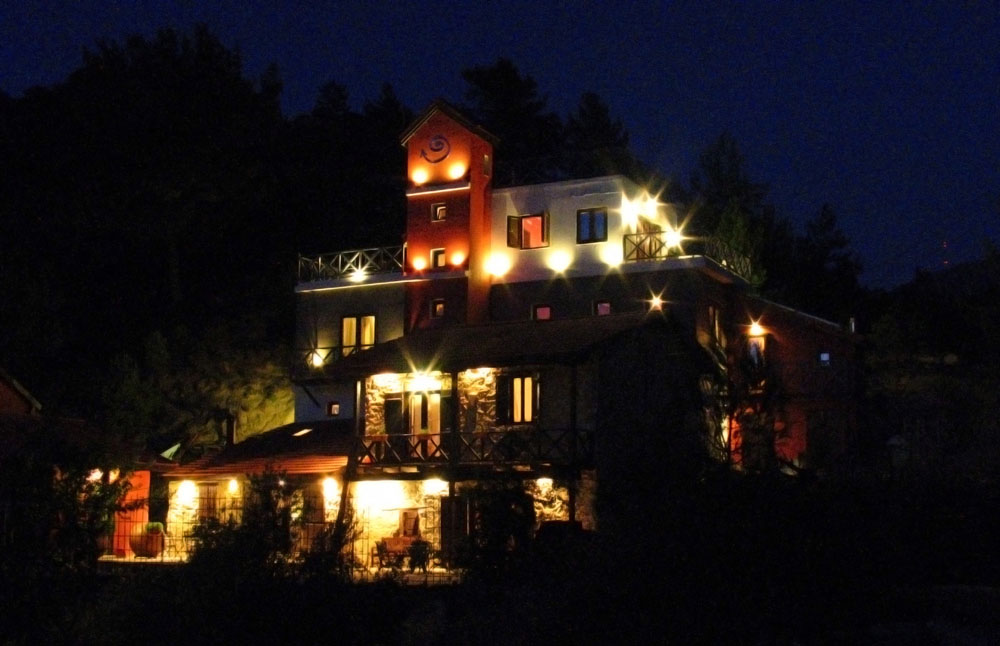
Parakentro is a non-profit cultural centre in Lemythou village

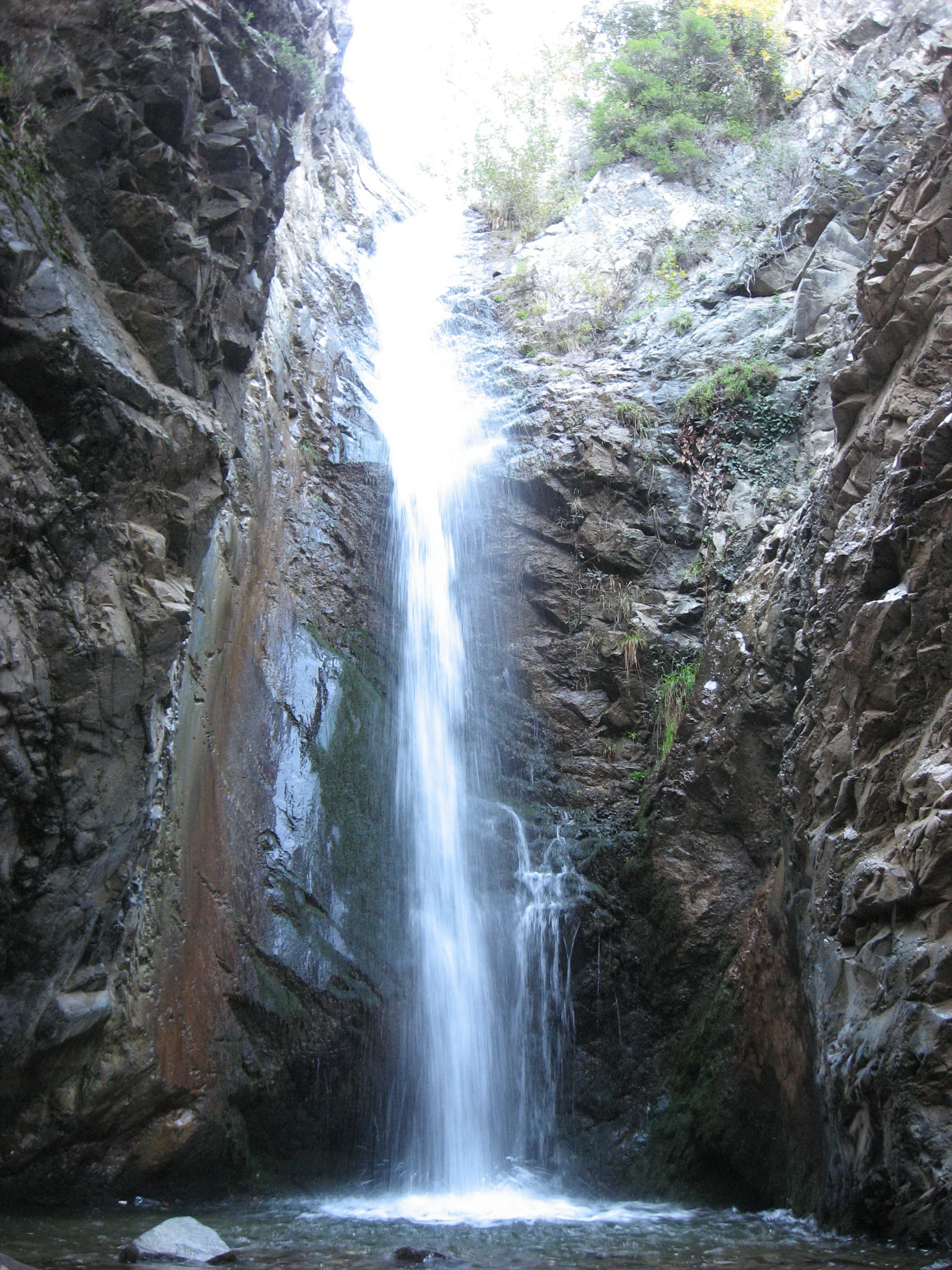
Millomeris Waterfall, Platres

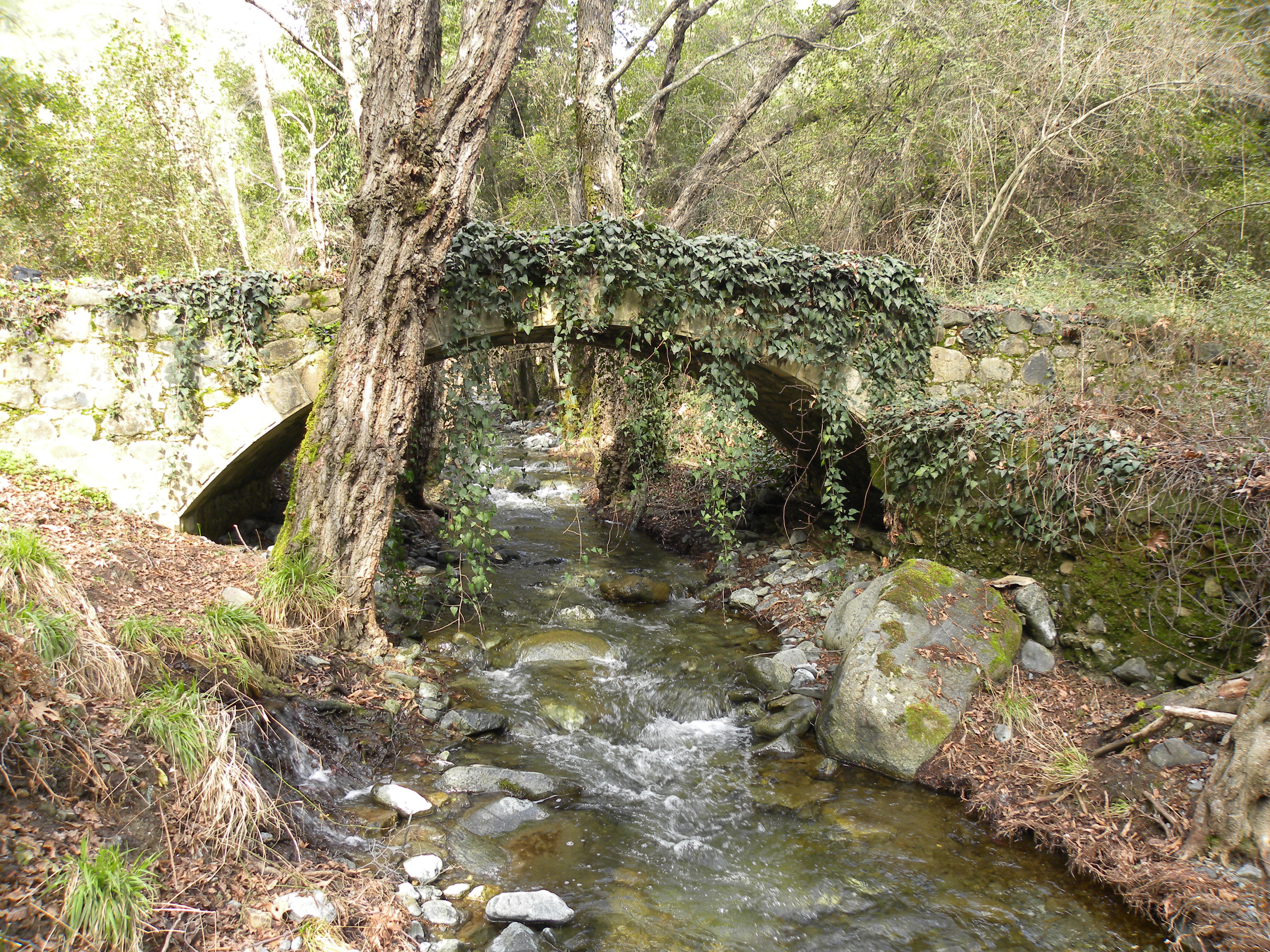
Milia Bridge, Platres

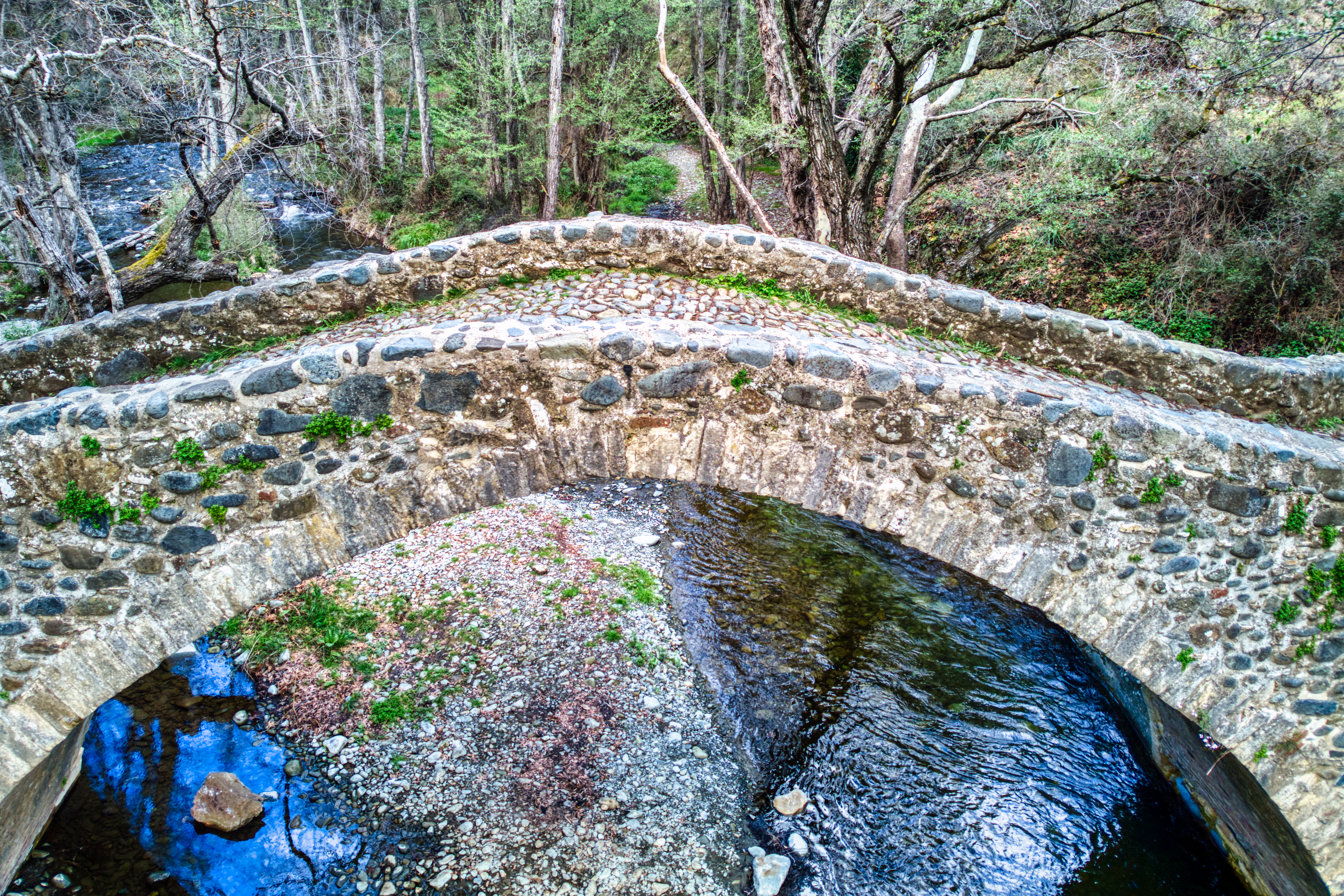
Tzielefos bridge

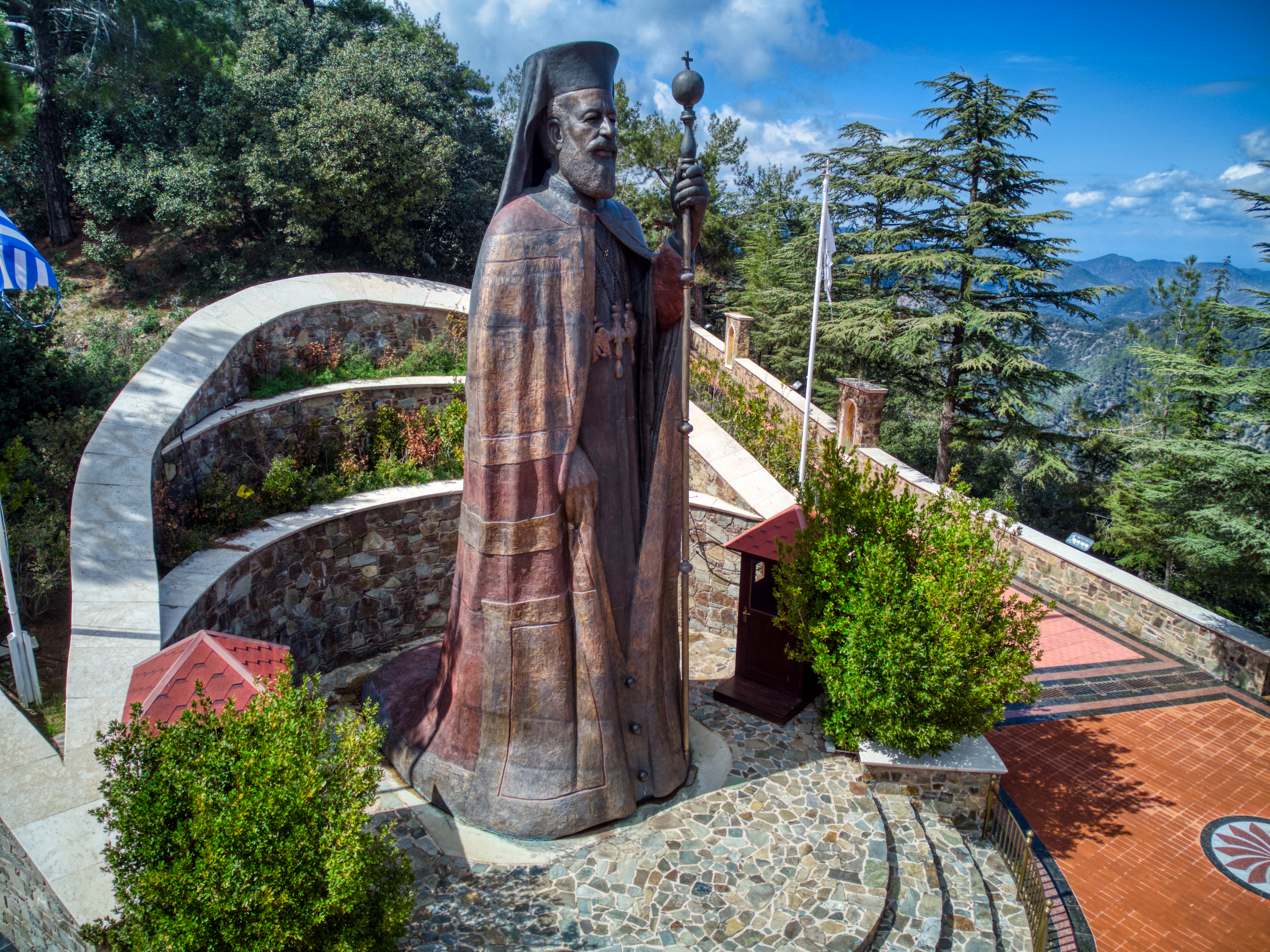
The statue of Archbishop Makarios III near the Kykkos Monastery

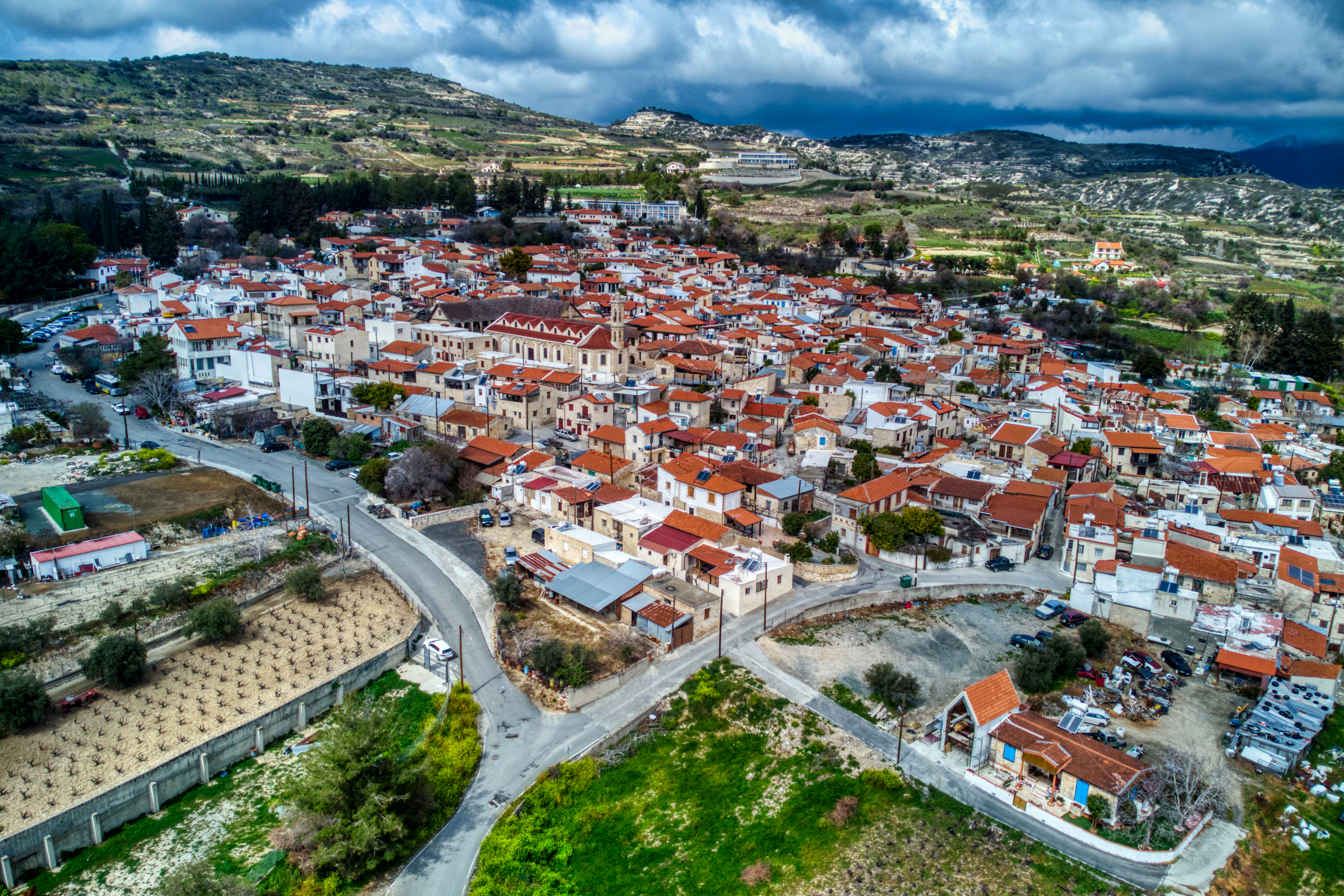
Omodos

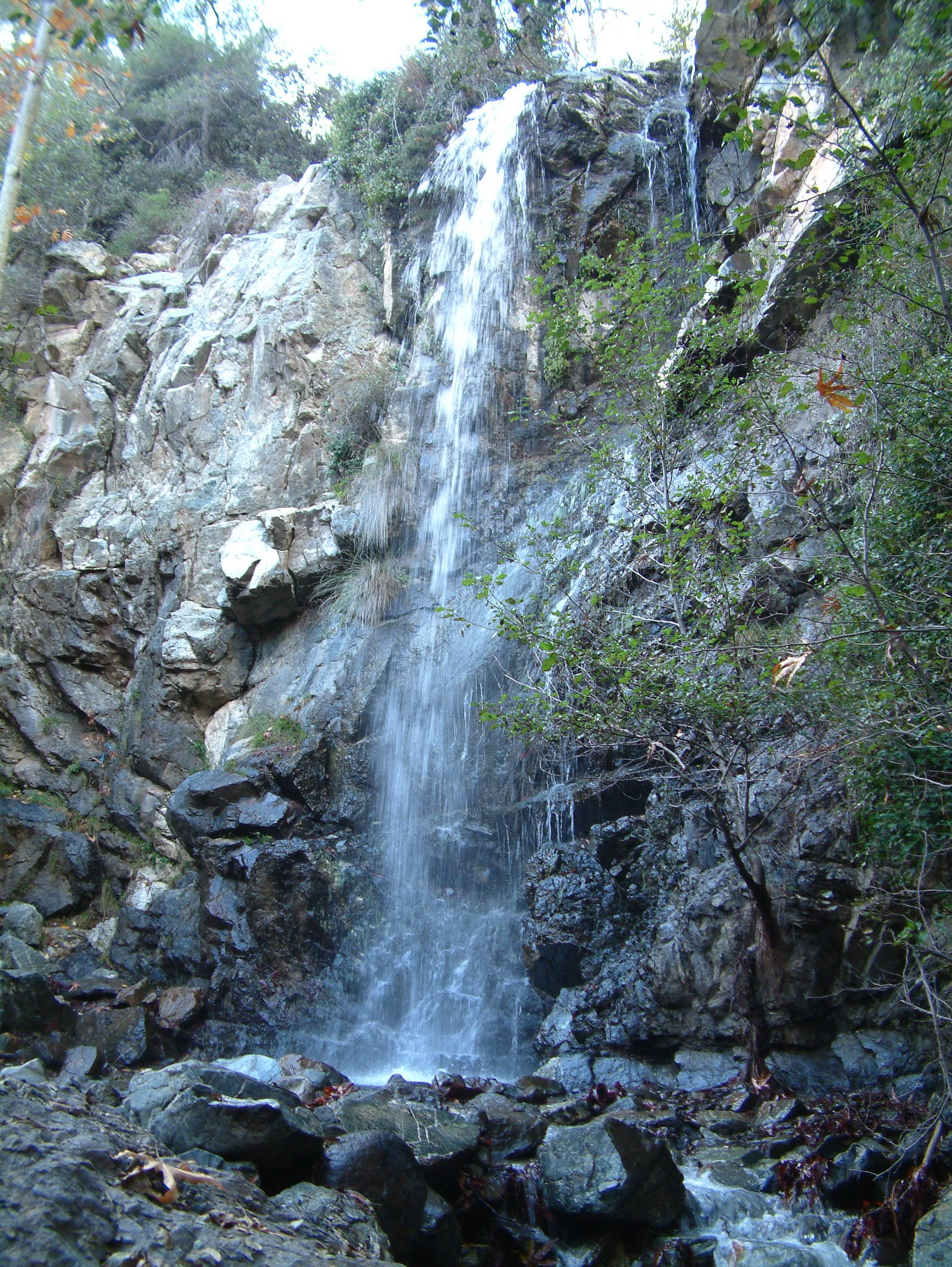
Kalidonia Waterfall, Platres

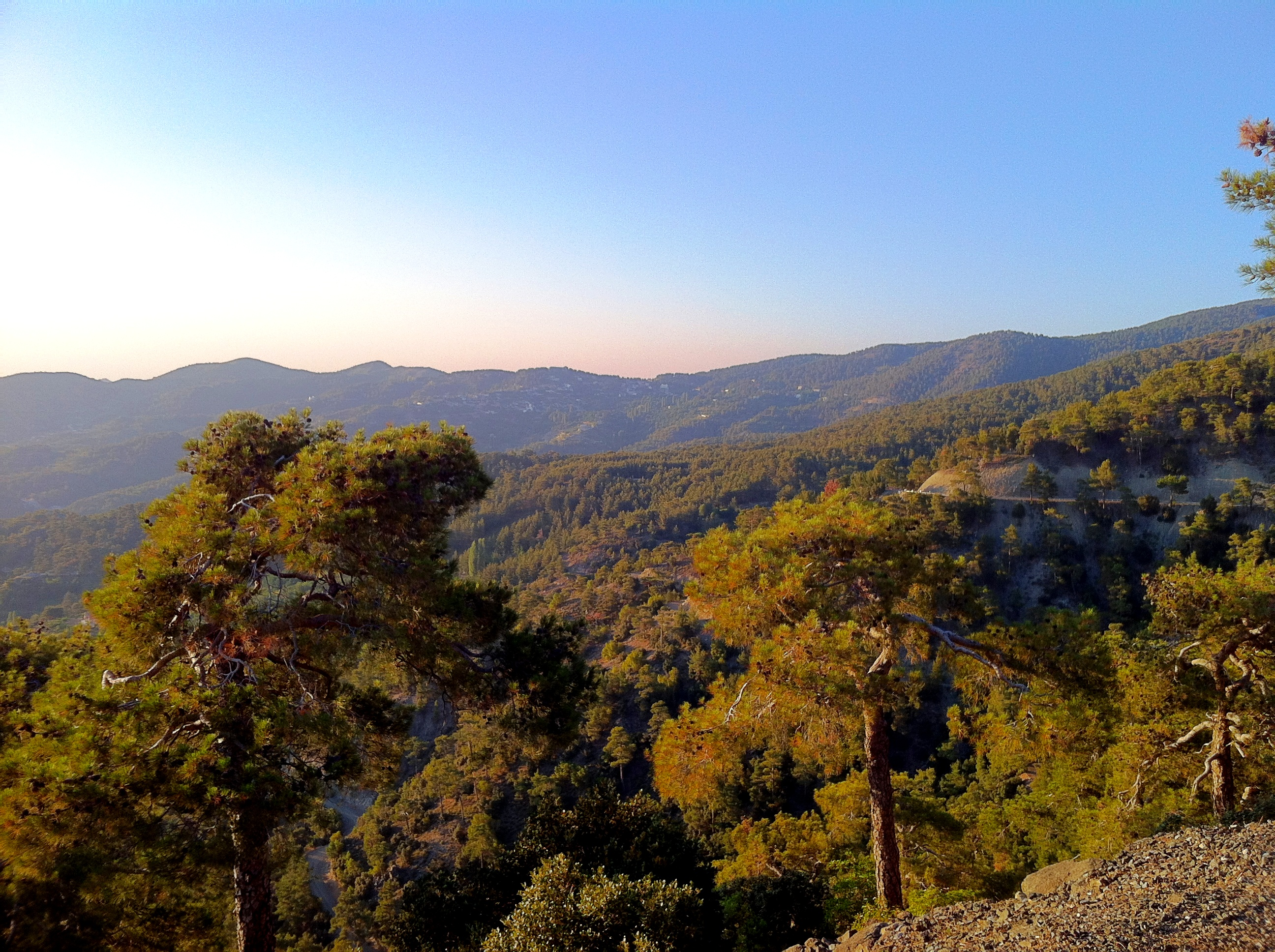
Part of Troodos Mountains

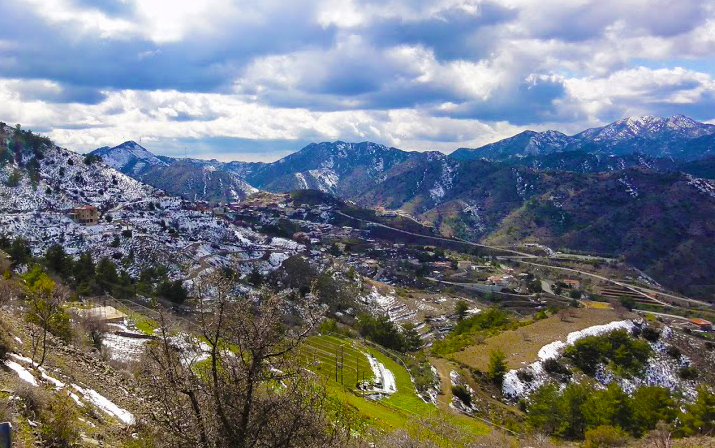
View of Farmakas region

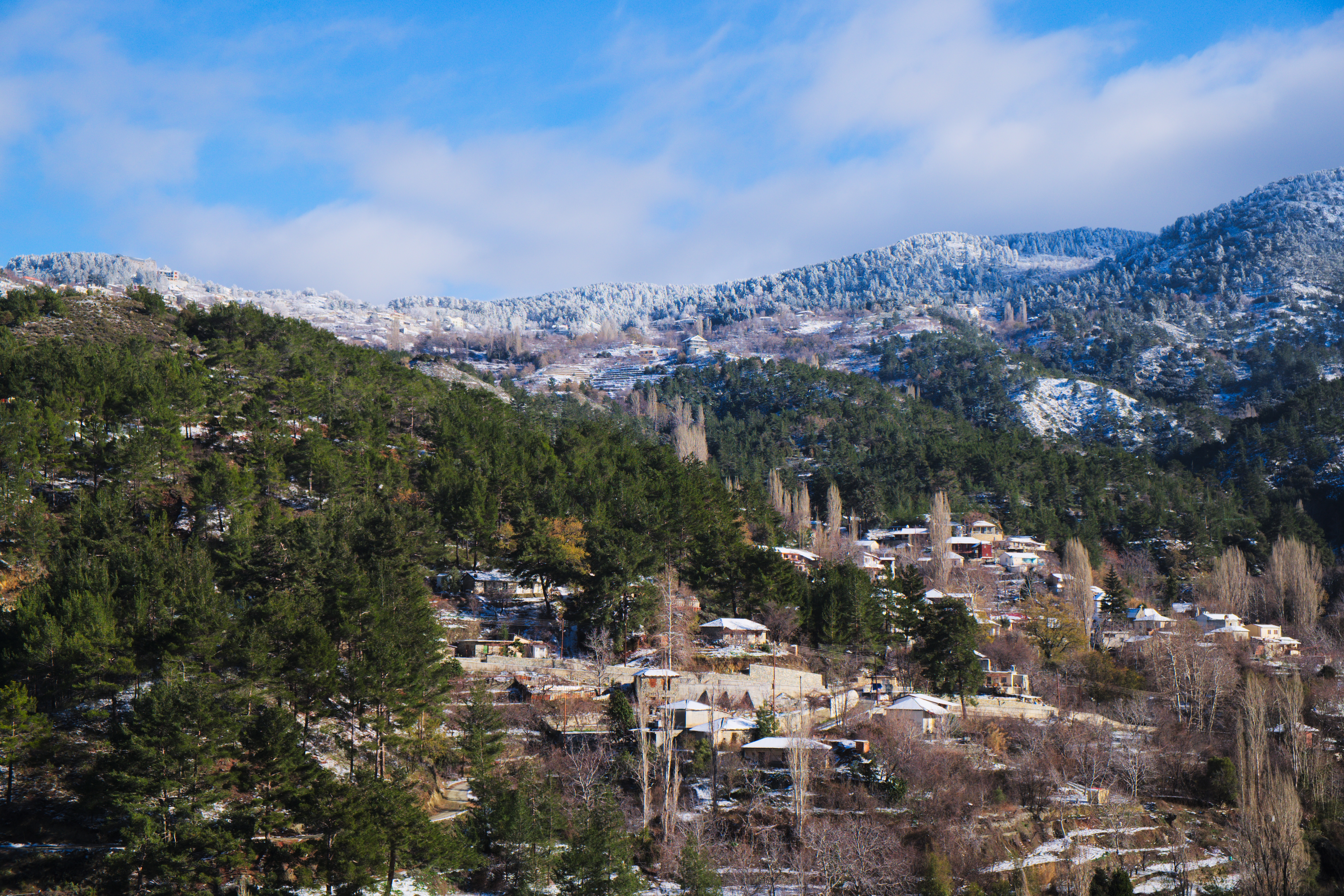
Prodromos in winter

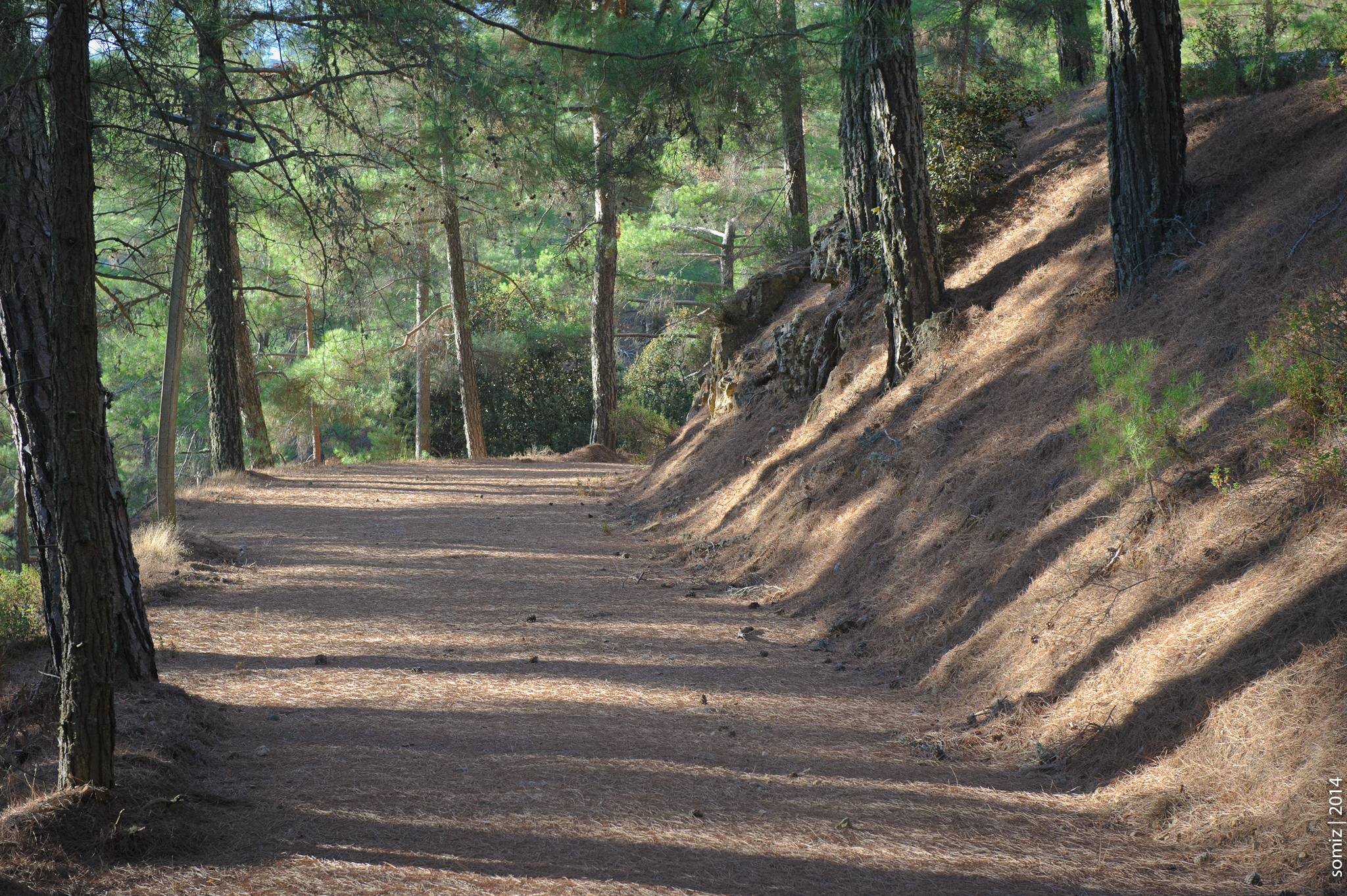
Road through the forest

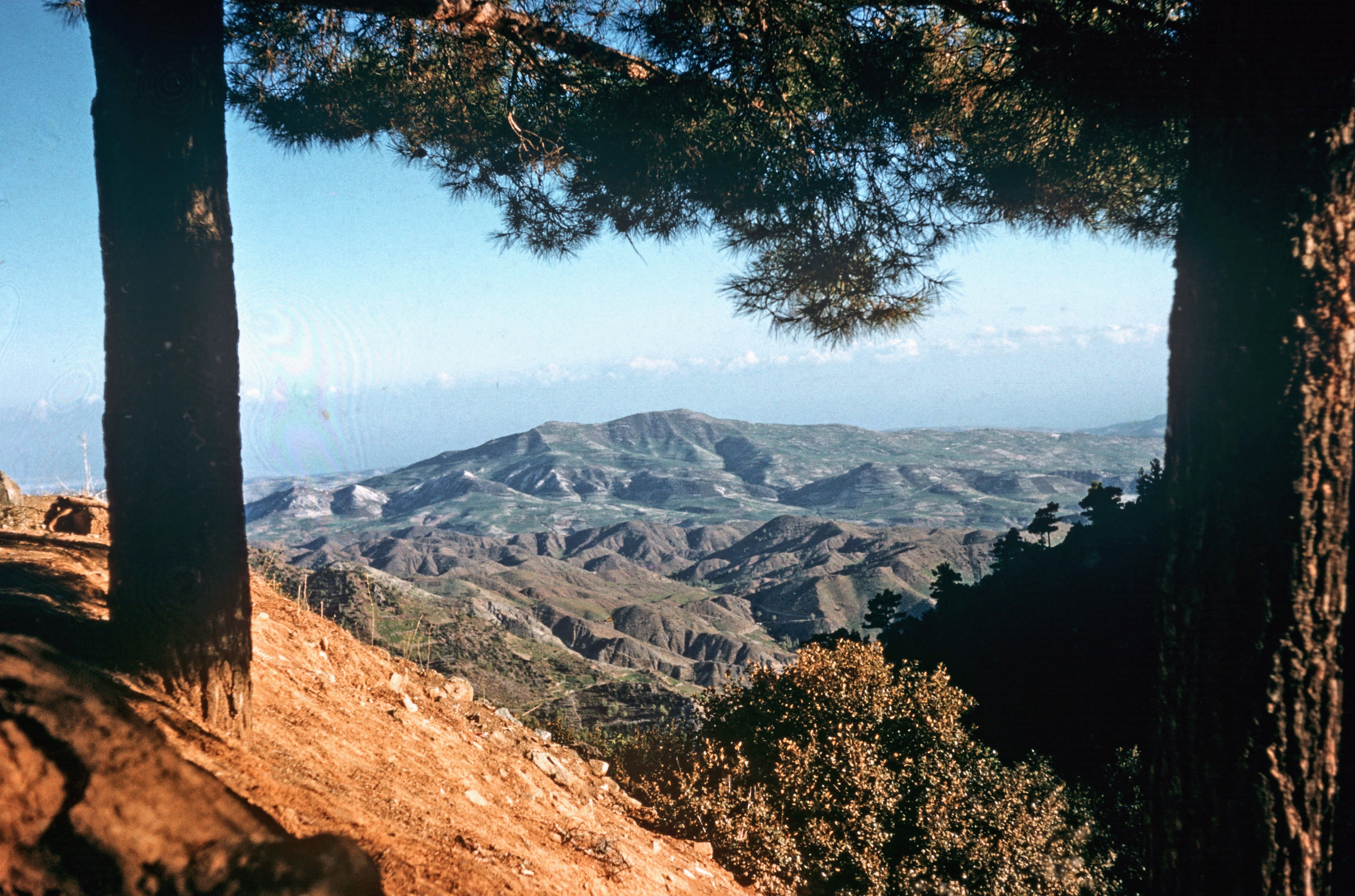
Troodos Mountains in 1957

== See also ==
- Geography of Cyprus
