= Prodromos, Cyprus =

Prodromos Πρόδρομος
- Village
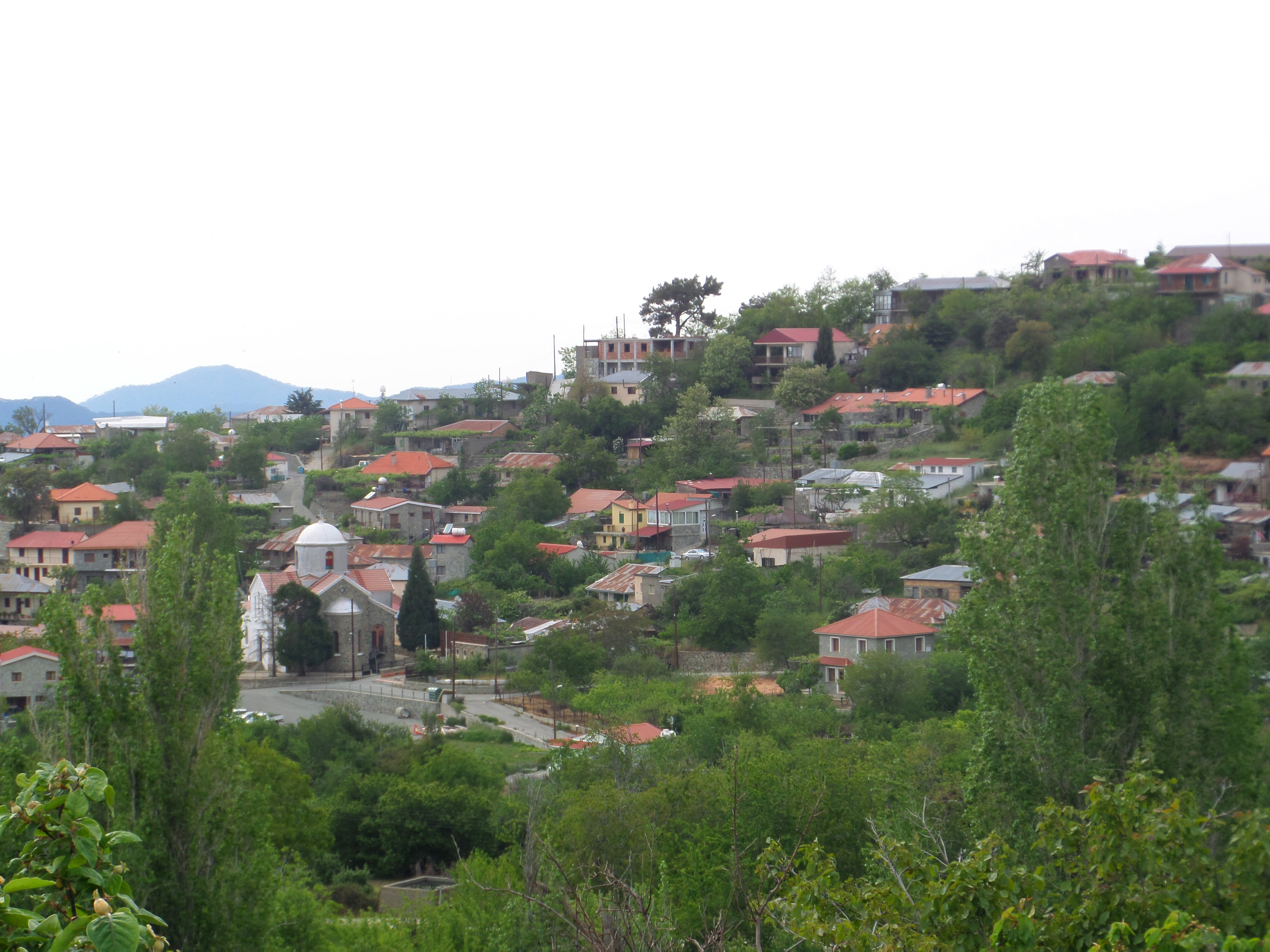
- A view of the village in April 2018

- Location in Cyprus
- Coordinates: 34°56′54″N 32°49′46″E
- Country: Cyprus
- District: Limassol District
- Elevation: 1,380 m (4,530 ft)

Population (2014)
  - Total: 102
- Time zone: UTC+2 (EET)
  - Summer (DST): UTC+3 (EEST)
- Postal code: 4840
- Website: http://www.prodromos.org.cy/

Prodromos (Greek: Πρόδρομος) is the highest village in Cyprus at 1,380 metres (4,530 ft) above sea level. It is the island's main centre for winter sport, with three ski slopes located on nearby Mount Olympus. The village is part of the Limassol District. The number of inhabitants has decreased steadily over the years; by the 2011 census there were only 123 permanent residents, although there are over 240 residences that are temporarily occupied, mostly during the summer and other holidays.

== Topography ==
Prodromos is built at an altitude of 1,390 meters on the mountainside and covered in the dense mountainous vegetation of Troodos. It has generelly low temperature in the summer and heavy snowfall in the winter.

== Etymology ==
Prodromos is named after John the Baptist, who is commonly referred to in Greek Orthodox tradition as 'Prodromos' ('Forerunner' to Christ).

== Camping ==
The snow often exceeds one meter and covers the village for several weeks, and sometimes the temperature falls below zero, making the village a favorite destination for winter tourism, since at a short distance there is the Troodos ski center. With the coming of spring, many are those who enjoy hiking in the mountains, on the Nature Trails and stop at Prodromos for a relaxing lunch or coffee in its taverns and cafes. In summer those who have houses there, rent them to those who want to spend the summer in the mountains, enjoying nature, while for those who prefer camping, there is a camping site called “Kambi tou Kalogerou”.

== Climate ==
Prodromos experiences a Mediterranean climate (Köppen: Csa) with warm to hot, dry summers and cool to cold, very wet winters. Night frost is very frequent and snow often falls during winter.

Climate data for Prodromos, Cyprus (1981-2010 normals, extremes 1991-2018)
Month	Jan	Feb	Mar	Apr	May	Jun	Jul	Aug	Sep	Oct	Nov	Dec	Year
Record high °C (°F)	19.0 (66.2)	20.6 (69.1)	24.6 (76.3)	29.2 (84.6)	33.4 (92.1)	34.4 (93.9)	36.7 (98.1)	36.0 (96.8)	32.8 (91.0)	29.7 (85.5)	22.9 (73.2)	21.5 (70.7)	36.7 (98.1)
Mean daily maximum °C (°F)	6.4 (43.5)	6.8 (44.2)	10.3 (50.5)	15.5 (59.9)	20.3 (68.5)	25.0 (77.0)	27.9 (82.2)	28.0 (82.4)	24.6 (76.3)	19.3 (66.7)	12.8 (55.0)	8.3 (46.9)	17.1 (62.8)
Daily mean °C (°F)	3.5 (38.3)	3.6 (38.5)	6.5 (43.7)	11.1 (52.0)	15.5 (59.9)	20.0 (68.0)	23.0 (73.4)	23.1 (73.6)	19.7 (67.5)	15.1 (59.2)	9.5 (49.1)	5.5 (41.9)	13.0 (55.4)
Mean daily minimum °C (°F)	0.7 (33.3)	0.5 (32.9)	2.7 (36.9)	6.6 (43.9)	10.8 (51.4)	15.0 (59.0)	18.2 (64.8)	18.2 (64.8)	14.9 (58.8)	11.0 (51.8)	6.2 (43.2)	2.6 (36.7)	8.9 (48.0)
Record low °C (°F)	−10.7 (12.7)	−10.2 (13.6)	−6.5 (20.3)	−5.0 (23.0)	2.0 (35.6)	5.6 (42.1)	10.2 (50.4)	12.1 (53.8)	7.0 (44.6)	0.9 (33.6)	−6.0 (21.2)	−8.0 (17.6)	−10.7 (12.7)
Average precipitation mm (inches)	199.4 (7.85)	110.7 (4.36)	79.4 (3.13)	44.6 (1.76)	70.0 (2.76)	8.9 (0.35)	14.8 (0.58)	10.1 (0.40)	13.1 (0.52)	38.5 (1.52)	65.5 (2.58)	163.4 (6.43)	818.7 (32.23)
Average precipitation days (≥ 1.0 mm)	14.8	8.6	6.1	5.7	4.9	1.4	1.3	1.1	2.2	4.3	6.2	10.9	67.5
Mean monthly sunshine hours	130.2	146.9	195.3	231.0	275.9	315.0	328.6	310.0	255.0	220.1	165.0	136.4	2,709.4
Percentage possible sunshine	42	49	53	60	64	73	75	75	70	64	54	45	62
Source: Cyprus Department of Meteorology (precipitation 2010-2018, sunshine 1991-2005)
