= Kykkos watermill =

Ancient watermill in Kalopanayotis, Cyprus

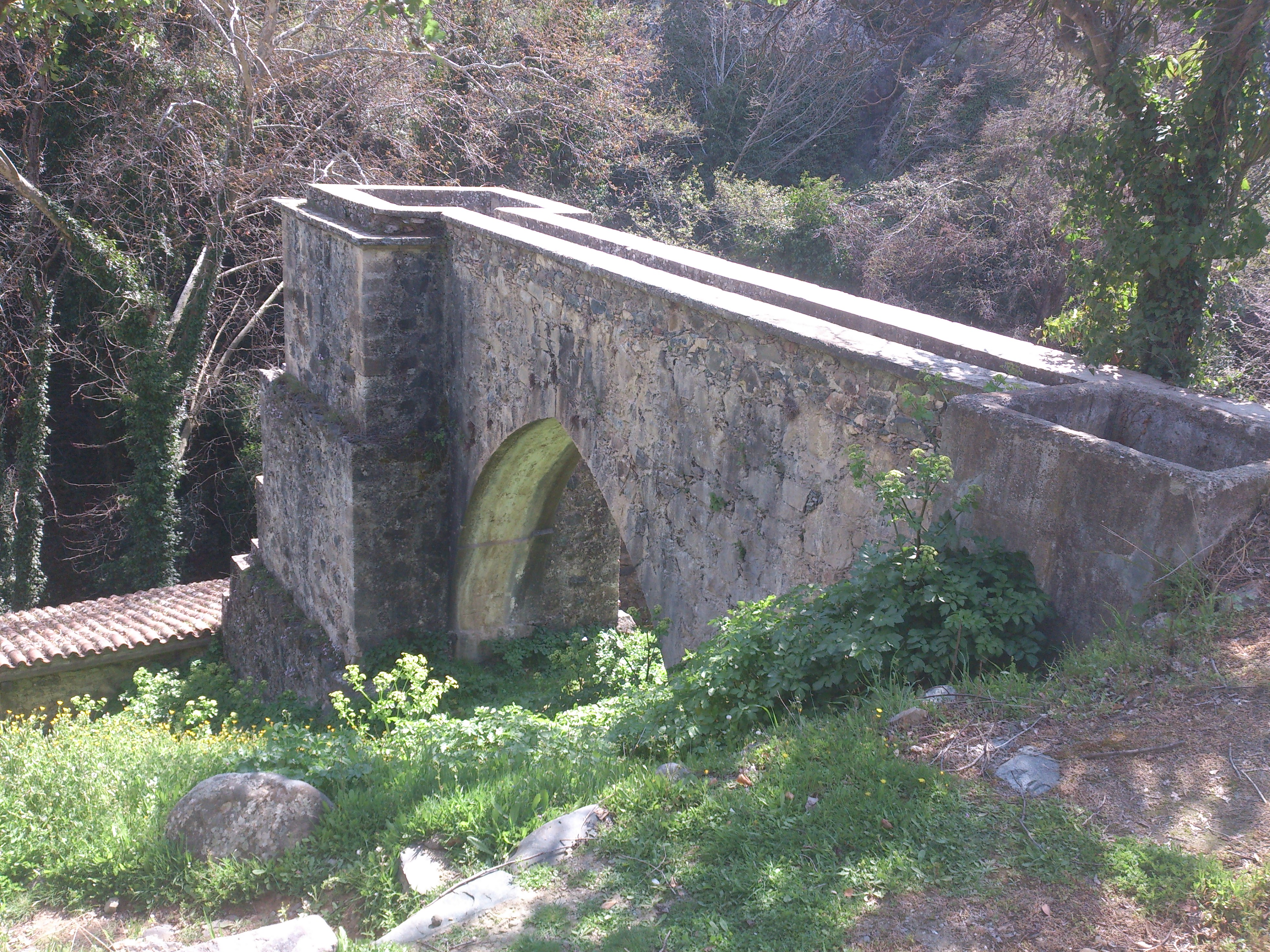
Kykkos Watermill

The Kykkos watermill is a mill in Cyprus. It has been declared a “heritage monument” by the Cyprus Department of Antiquities. Ιt is one of the most significant monuments of Kalopanagiotis village and it attracts many visitors. The watermill, which was owned by the Kykkos monastery, consisted of a building complex that still survives in its entirety.

The watermill can be found along a marked nature trail that also includes a 16-century Venetian bridge.
