= Kalopanagiotis =

Kalopanagiotis: Καλοπαναγιώτης (Greek); Kalapanayot (Turkish)
- Village
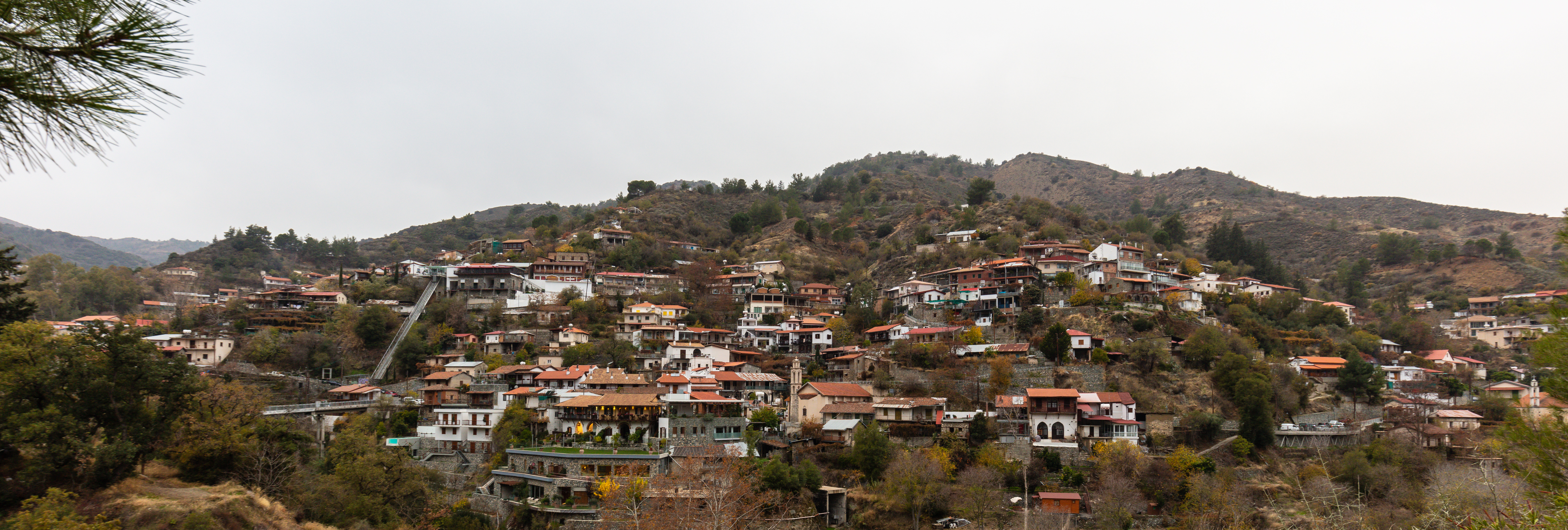

- Location in Cyprus
- Coordinates: 34°59′31″N 32°49′45″E
- Country: Cyprus
- District: Nicosia District

Population (2001)
  - Total: 287
- Time zone: UTC+2 (EET)
  - Summer (DST): UTC+3 (EEST)

Kalopanagiotis (Greek: Καλοπαναγιώτης; Turkish: Kalapanayot) is a village in the Nicosia District of Cyprus, located 3 km north of Moutoullas in the Troodos Mountains. It lies in Marathasa Valley. The village and its architecture include cobbled streets and footpaths, chapels and churches. Houses with tiled rooftops, balconies, courtyards and shady vine trees are characteristic of the village. The village is surrounded by the green vegetation of the Setrachos Valley.

In the village, there are a number of churches and chapels, such as the churches of Saint Marina and Panayia Theotokos, the chapels of Saint Andronikos and Saint Athanasia, Saint George, Saint Kyriakos, Archangelos Michael, Saint Sergios and Bachos and Panayia Theoskepasti.

The most notable Byzantine monuments in the area include the monastery of Saint John Lampadistis, and the Kykkos watermill. The monastery of Saint John Lampadistis is one of the ten Painted Churches in the Troödos Region, which were inscribed as a UNESCO World Heritage Site in 1985 because of their outstanding frescoes and testimony to the history of Byzantine rule in Cyprus.

== Gallery ==
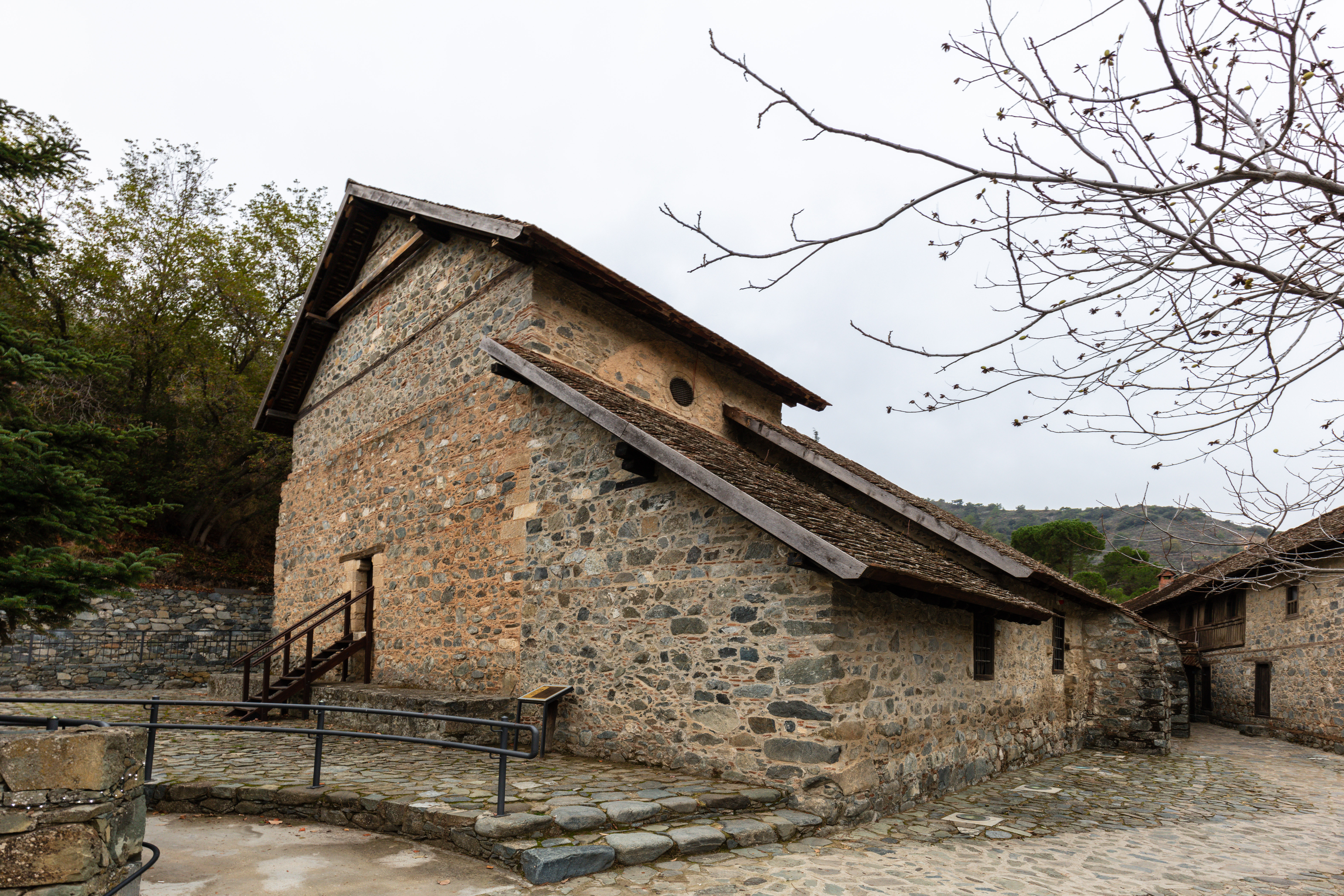
Saint John Lampadistis

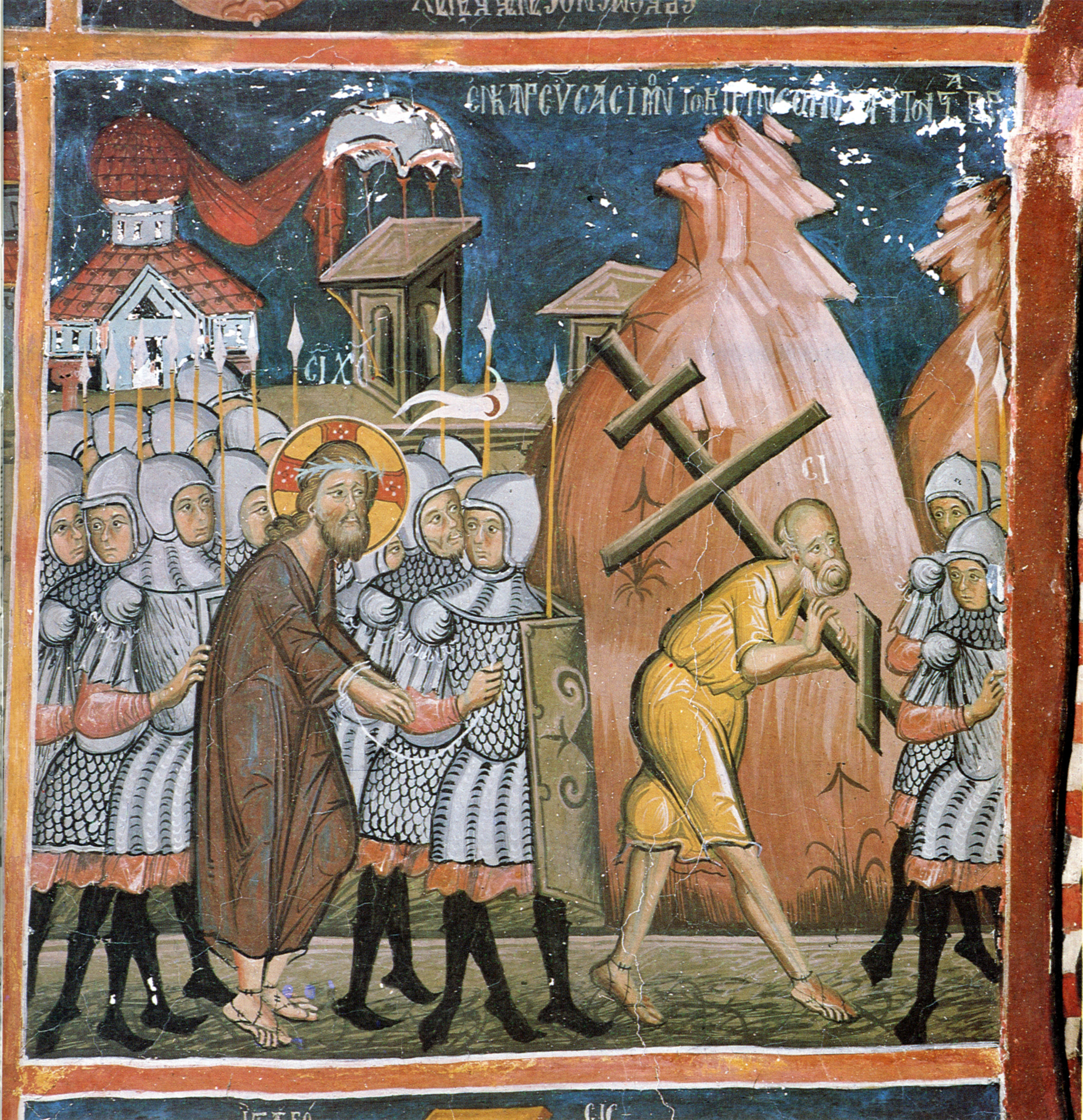
Christ's way to the Crucifixion

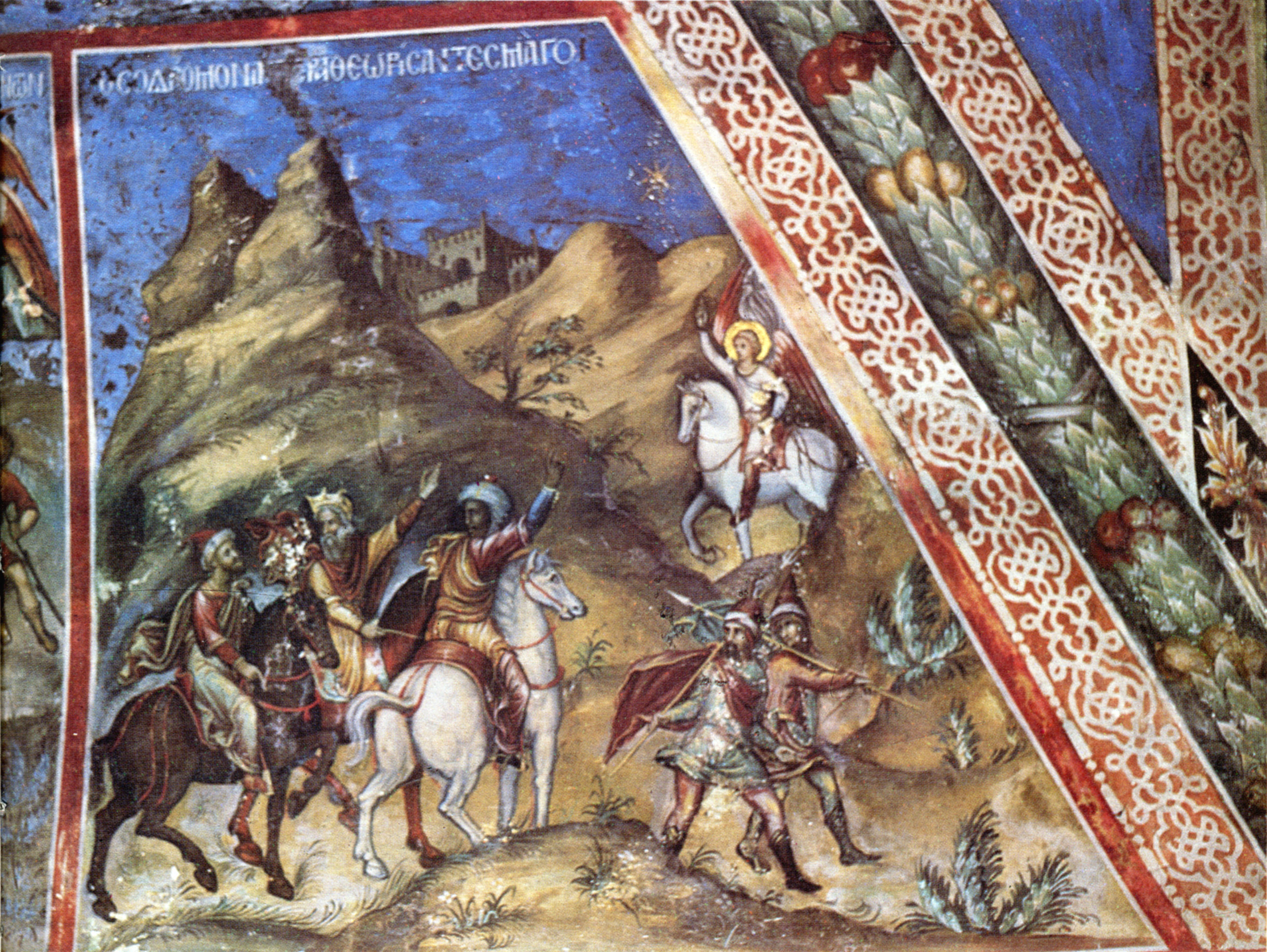
Three biblical Magi
