= Farmakas =

Farmakas: Φαρμακάς (Greek); Farmakas (Turkish)
- Village
- Location in Cyprus
- Coordinates: 34°54′43″N 33°8′10″E
- Country: Cyprus
- District: Nicosia District
- Elevation: 3,219 ft (981 m)

Population (2001)
  - Total: 507
- Time zone: UTC+2 (EET)
  - Summer (DST): UTC+3 (EEST)
- Postal code: 2620
- Website: farmakas.org

Farmakas (Greek: Φαρμακάς; Turkish: Farmakas) is a village in the Nicosia District of Cyprus, located around 5 km east of the village of Palaichori Oreinis.

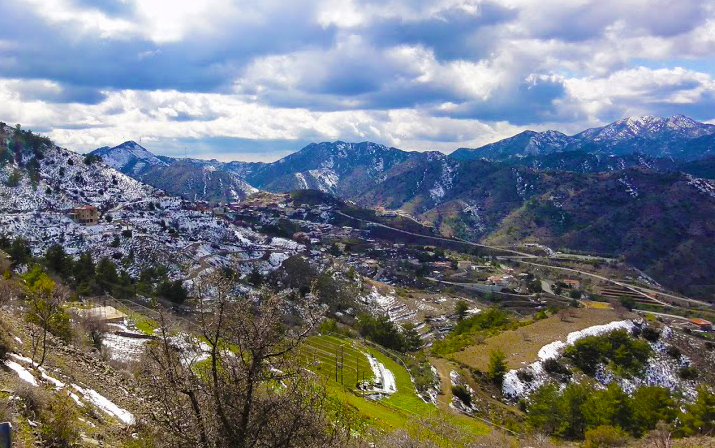
The village of Farmakas in the Troodos Mountains, Cyprus

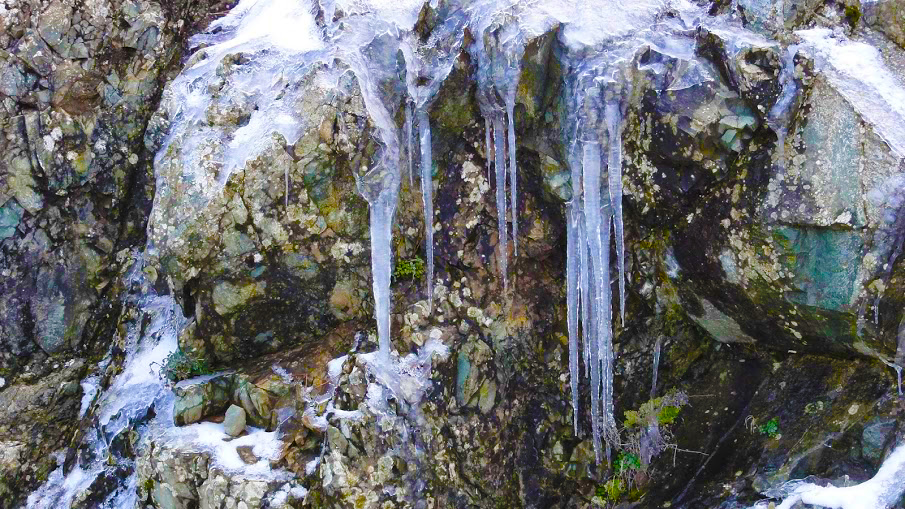
Troodos Geology, Cyprus. The source of Farmakas Springs

It is a fragment of a fully developed oceanic crust, consisting of plutonic, intrusive and volcanic rocks and chemical sediments. The stratigraphic completeness of the ophiolite makes it unique. It was created during the complex process of sea-floor spreading and formation of oceanic crust and was emerged and placed in its present position through complicated tectonic processes related to the collision of the Eurasian Plate to the north and the African Plate to the south.

The Troodos Ophiolite has a very significant role for the water budget of the island. Most of the rocks, especially the gabbros and the sheeted dykes are good aquifers due to fracturing. The perennial rivers running radially are feeding the main aquifers in the periphery of the Troodos and the plains.

== See also ==
- Geography of Cyprus
