= Louvaras =

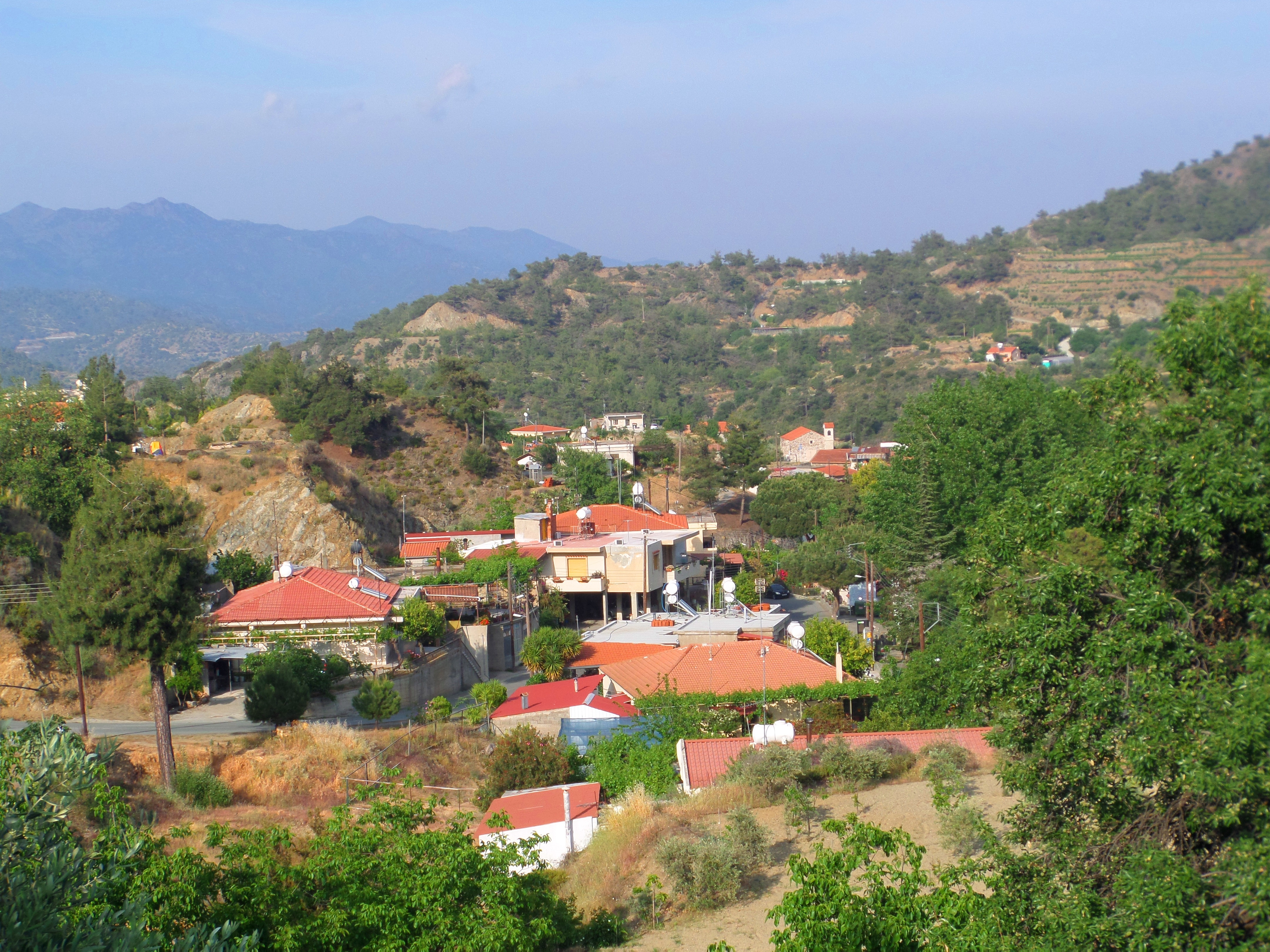
- Interactive map of Louvaras
- Coordinates: 34°50′12″N 33°02′27″E
- Country: Cyprus
- District: Limassol District

Population (2001)
  - Total: 380
- Time zone: UTC+2 (EET)
  - Summer (DST): UTC+3 (EEST)

Louvaras is a village in the Troödos Mountains of Cyprus. The village is 28 kilometers north of Limassol. Of interest are the frescos in the small medieval church of St Mamas, built in 1455 in the centre of the village. The hamlet of Athrakos is part of the municipality.
