= Foini =

Foini Φοινί
- Village
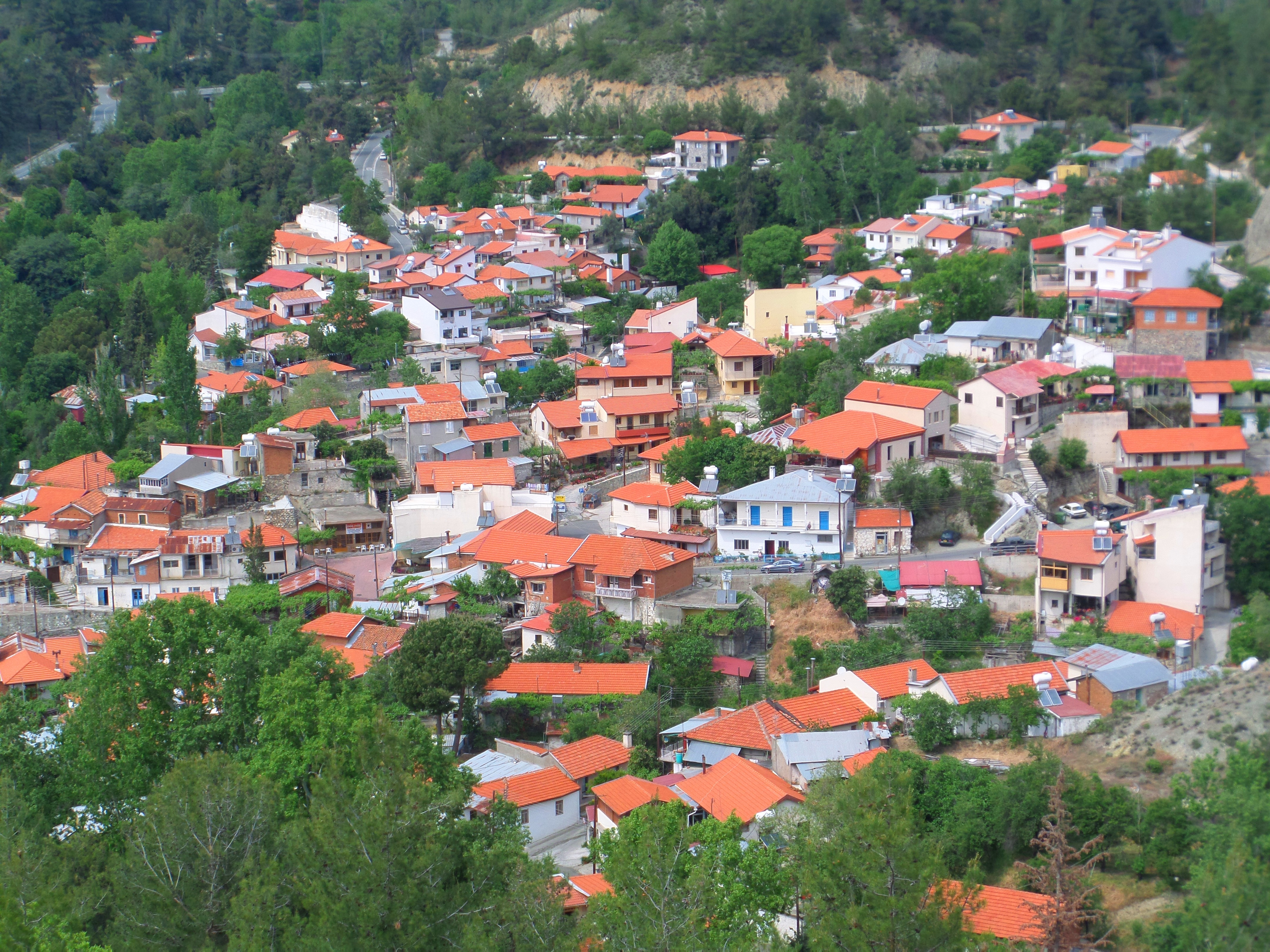

- Location in Cyprus
- Coordinates: 34°53′0″N 32°50′0″E
- Country: Cyprus
- District: Limassol District

Population (2021)
  - Total: 347
- Time zone: UTC+2 (EET)
  - Summer (DST): UTC+3 (EEST)

Foini (Greek: Φοινί, sometimes also spelled Phini), is a village in the Troödos Mountains of Cyprus. The village is notable for its pottery. The town of Kato Plátres is located nearby.

== Nature ==
Many creeks originating from the Troodos peaks end up at the heart of the village. The village of Foini is located near the springs of river Diarizos; one of them is located in Foini and the other in the village of Kaminaria.

The wild vegetation in Foini includes rich flora and characteristic kinds of Cypriot fauna. Mostly pine trees, aspens, cedars, and a great range of seasonal flowers, such as roses are found in the areas covered by wild vegetation, especially near the river banks.
