= Mount Olympus (Cyprus) =

Highest mountain in Cyprus

- Chionistra
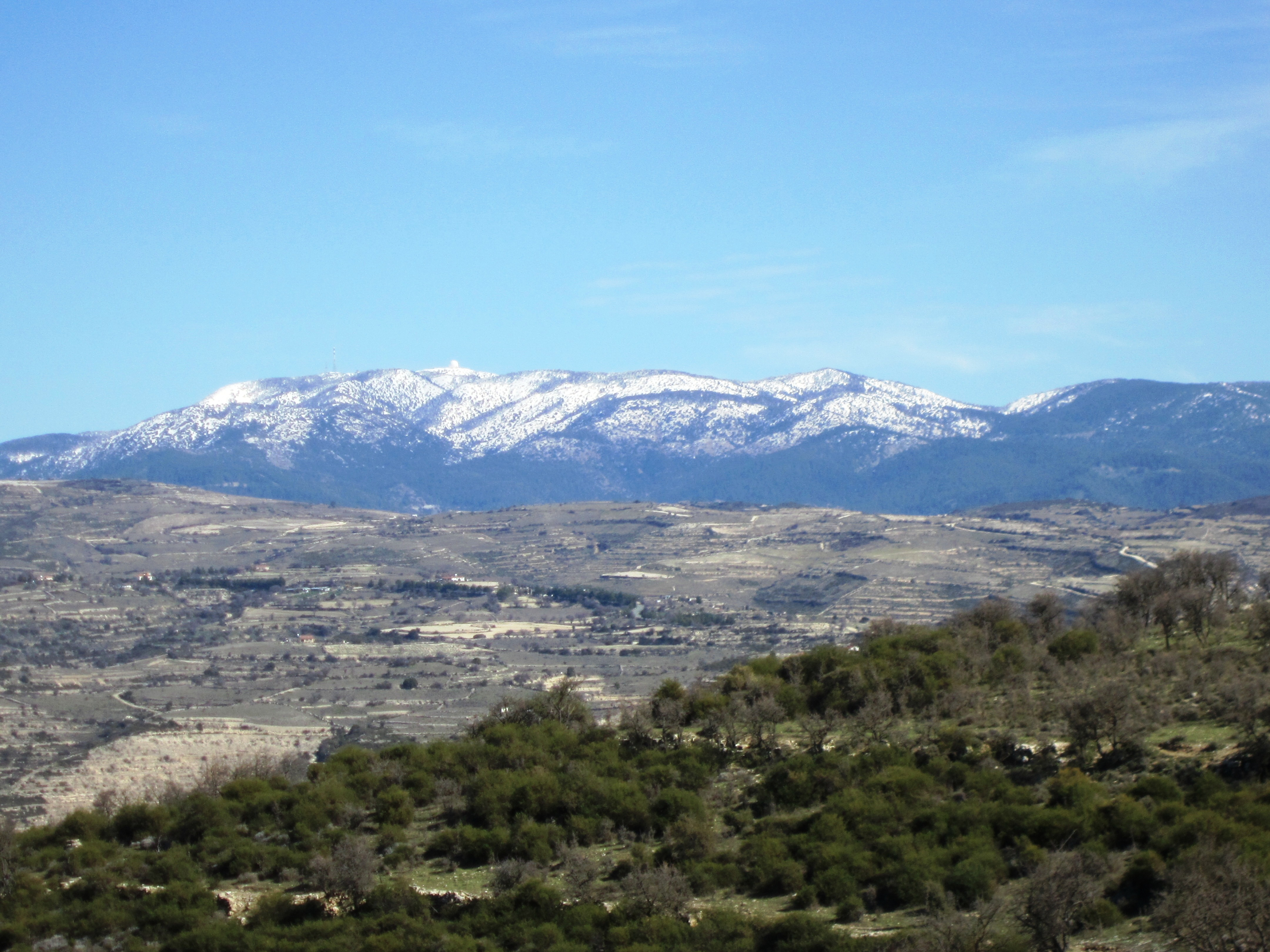
- Mount Olympus in Winter

Highest point
- Elevation: 1,952 m (6,404 ft)
- Prominence: 1,952 m (6,404 ft)
- Listing: Country high point Ultra, Ribu
- Coordinates: 34°56′11″N 32°51′48″E

Geography
- Location within Cyprus
- Location: Cyprus
- Parent range: Troodos

Olympus, or Chionistra, (Greek: Όλυμπος or Χιονίστρα; Turkish: Olimpos Tepesi) at 1,952 metres (6,404 ft), is the highest point in Cyprus. It is located in the Troodos Mountains of Cyprus. Mount Olympus peak and the "Troodos Square" fall under the territory of Platres in Limassol District. A British long range radar currently operates at Mount Olympus' peak. It has a highland warm-summer mediterranean climate.

Mount Olympus is formed of ultramafic rock, dominantly serpentinized harzburgite which is part of the Troodos ophiolite.

Writing in the late first century BC or first century AD, the geographer Strabo reported that on one of its promontories was a temple to Aphrodite Acraea (Ancient Greek: Ἀφροδίτης Ἀκραίας) which means Aphrodite of the Heights, which women were forbidden to enter.

== Resort ==
The Mount Olympus Ski resort consists of the Sun Valley and North Face areas. Each area has its own ski lifts and runs, operated by the Cyprus Ski Club:

- Aphrodite or Sun Valley I, with a 125m T-bar ski lift and beginner-level slopes
- Hermes or Sun Valley II, with a 140m T-bar ski lift and intermediate-level slopes
- Dias/Zeus or North Face I, with a 380m chairlift and advanced-level slopes
- Hera or North Face II, with a 262m T-bar ski lift and beginner-level slopes

In the Sun Valley area there is a 55m rope tow baby lift as well.

== See also ==
- List of elevation extremes by country
- List of ultras of West Asia
