= Climate of Cyprus =

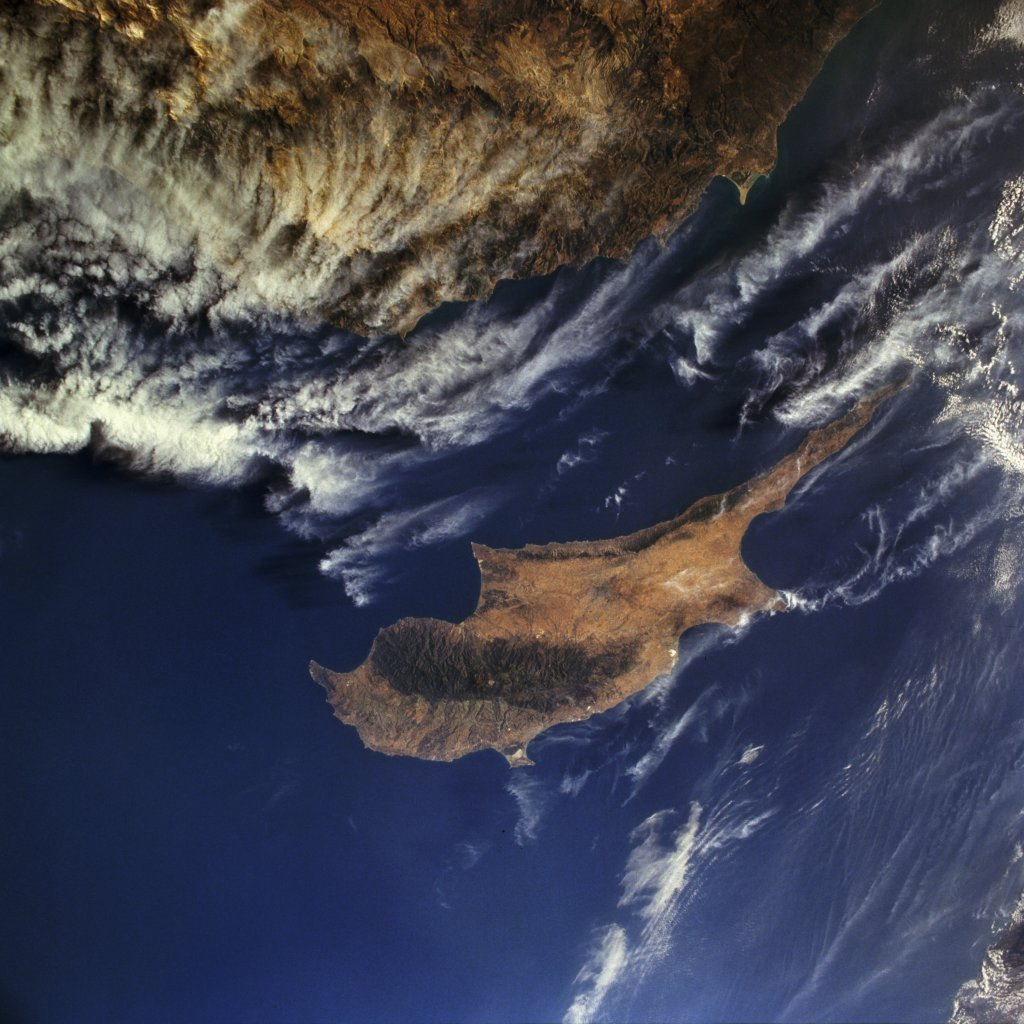
Cyprus from Space

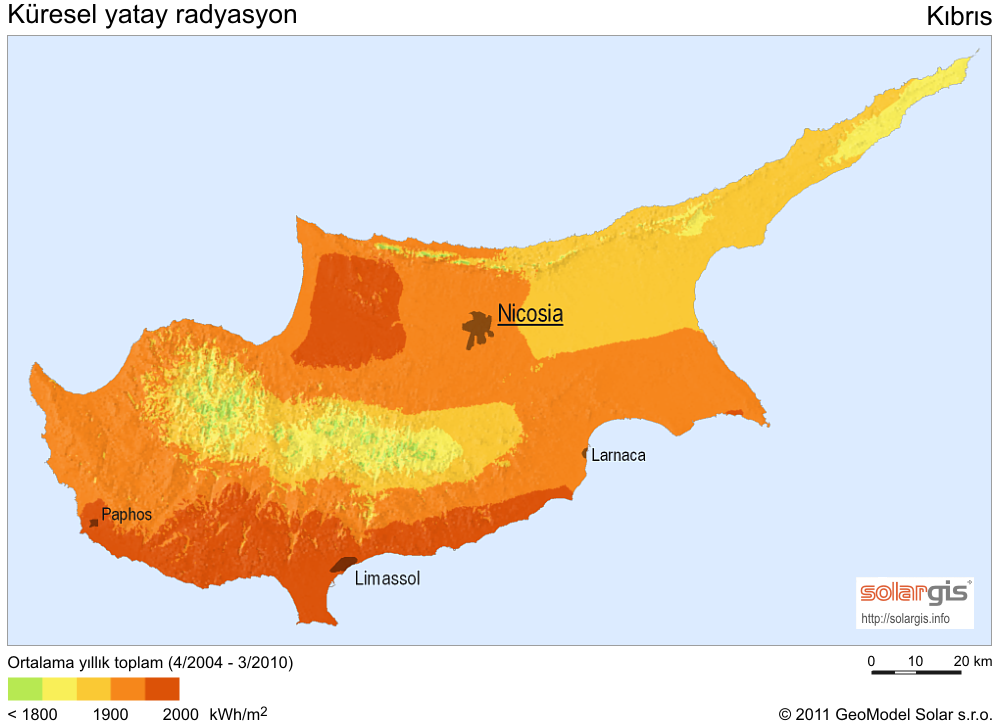
Solar Map of the Island

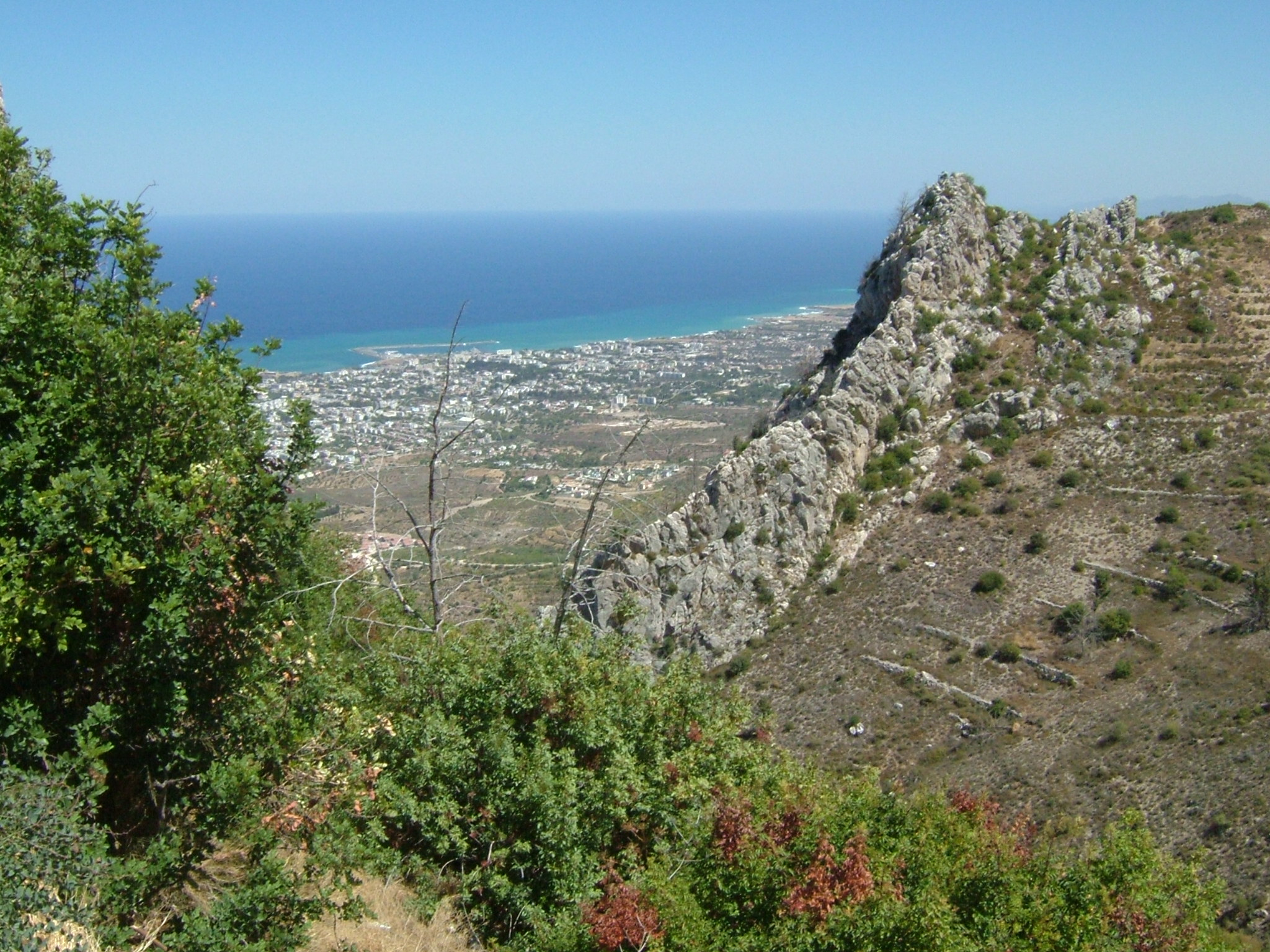
Mountainous Geography on the northern coast

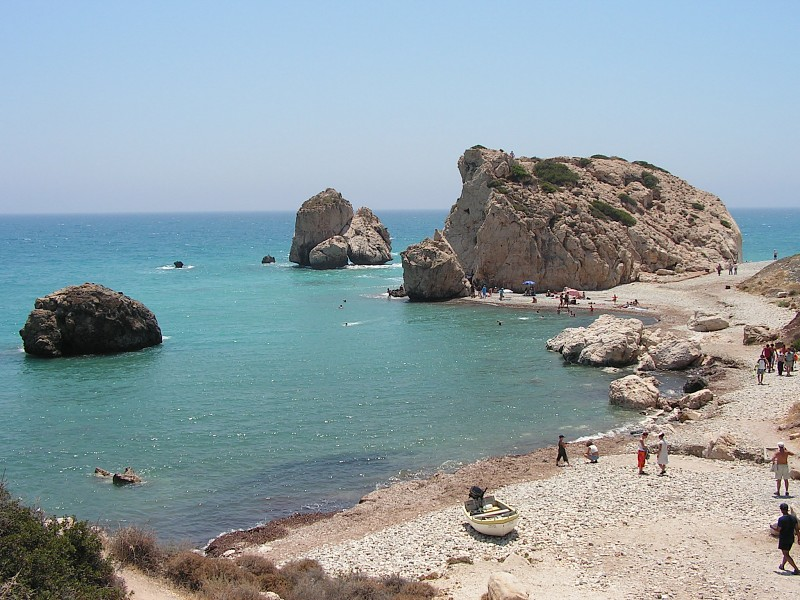
Seacoast from Southern Side

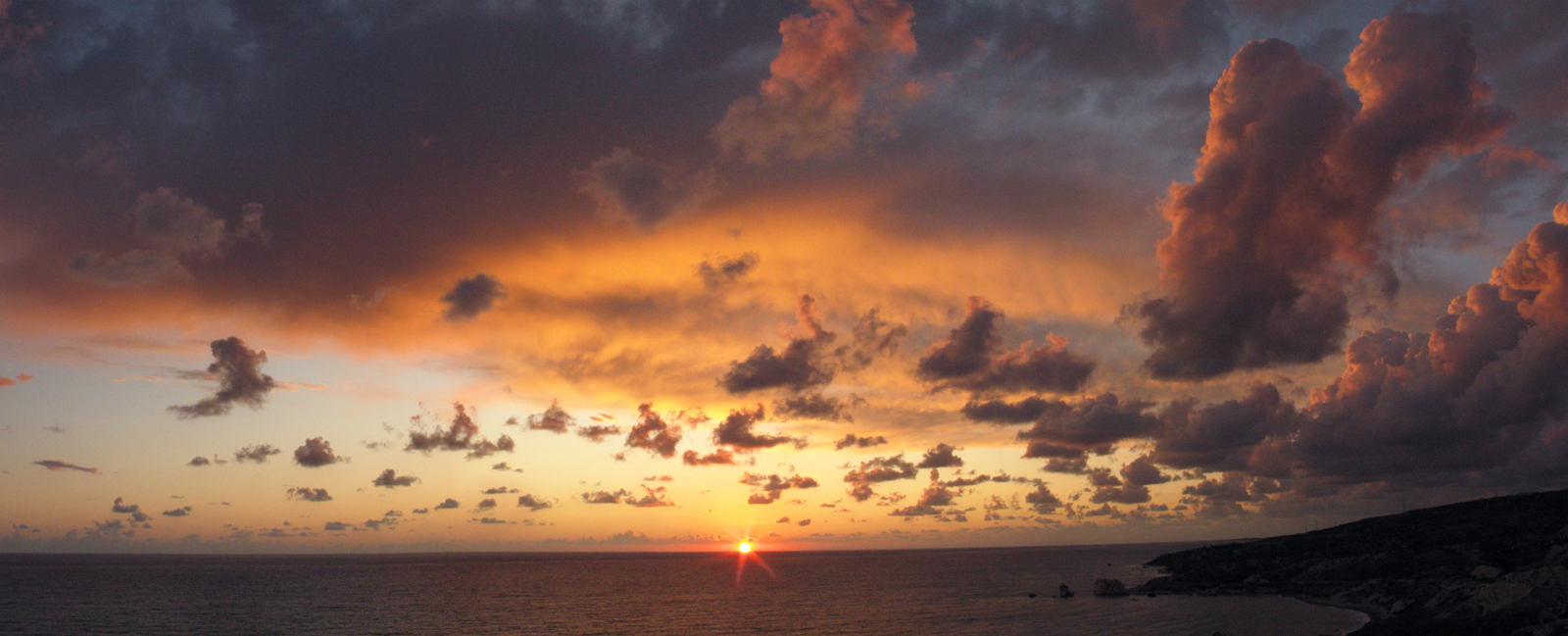
Sunsets on the island

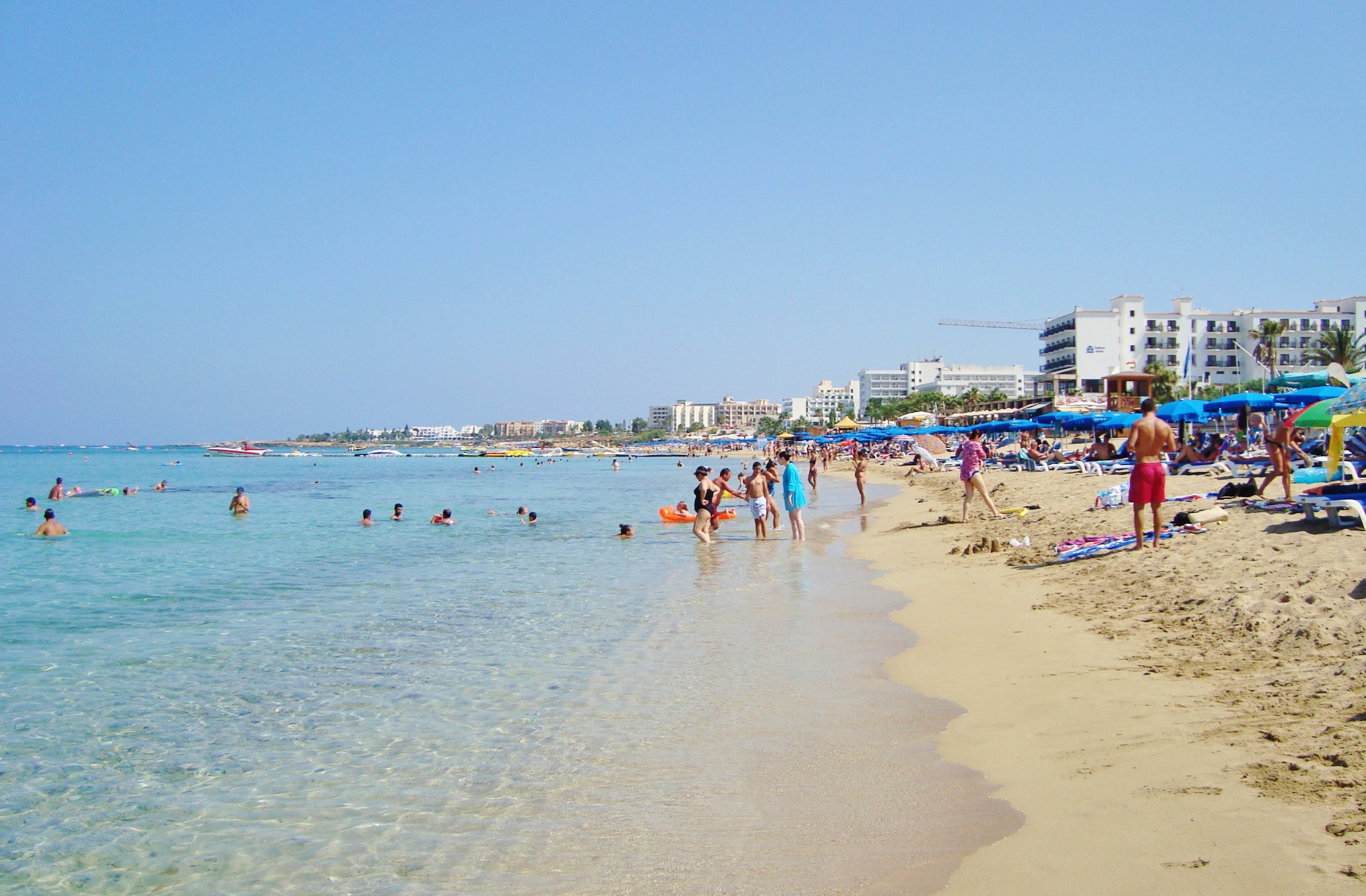
Seacoast from Eastern side

Cyprus has a subtropical climate, Mediterranean and semi-arid type (Csa and BSh) according to Köppen climate classification, with very mild winters on sea level and warm to hot summers. Snow is possible only in the Troodos Mountains in the central part of the island. Rain occurs mainly in winter, with summer being generally dry.

== Temperatures ==
Cyprus has one of the warmest climates and warmest winters in the Mediterranean part of the European Union. The average annual temperature on the coast is around 26 °C (79 °F) during the day and 17 °C (63 °F) at night. Generally, the warm season lasts about eight months. It begins in April, with average temperatures of 23–25 °C (73–77 °F) during the day and 13–15 °C (55–59 °F) at night, and ends in November, with average temperatures of 24–25 °C (75–77 °F) during the day and 14–17 °C (57–63 °F) at night. In the remaining four months of the year, the temperatures tend to remain mild, while sometimes exceeding 21 °C (70 °F) during the day. In Limassol, in the period January–February, the average maximum temperature is 18–20 °C (64–68 °F) during the day and 11–13 °C (52–55 °F) at night. In other coastal locations in Cyprus, the temperature is generally 16–18 °C (61–64 °F) during the day and 9–11 °C (48–52 °F) at night. In March and December in Limassol the average is 22–23 °C (72–73 °F) during the day and 12–14 °C (54–57 °F) at night; other coastal locations in Cyprus are generally 17–21 °C (63–70 °F) during the day and 8–11 °C (46–52 °F) at night.

The middle of summer (July and August) is usually hot, with an average maximum coastal temperature of around 37 °C (99 °F) during the day and around 28 °C (82 °F) at night. In the centre of the island (the highlands) the average temperature exceeds 37 °C (99 °F)). In June and September on the coast the average maximum temperature is usually around 30–32 °C (86–90 °F) during the day and around 19–21 °C (66–70 °F) at night. While large temperature fluctuations are rare on the coast, the centre of Cyprus has more variations – typically cool winters and hotter summers.

== Temperature of sea ==
The average annual temperature of the sea around Cyprus is 21–22 °C (70–72 °F), from 17 °C (63 °F) in February to 27–28 °C (81–82 °F) in August (depending on the location). In the seven months from May to November the average sea temperature exceeds 20 °C (68 °F).

Sea temperature
	Jan	Feb	Mar	Apr	May	Jun	Jul	Aug	Sep	Oct	Nov	Dec
Paphos	18	17	17	18	20	24	26	27	26	24	22	19
Larnaca	18	17	17	18	20	24	26	27	27	25	22	19
Limassol	18	17	17	18	20	24	26	27	27	25	22	19
Argaka												
Ayia Napa												
Coral Bay												
Famagusta												
Kyrenia									29			
Latchi												
Nissi Bay												
Peyia												
Polis												
Protaras												

== Sunshine ==
In winter, Cyprus receives an average of 5–6 hours of sunlight per day, half of the 12–13 hours experienced at the height of summer. This is about double that of cities in the northern half of Europe; for comparison, London has 1,461 hours. However, in winter there can be more than four times more sunshine; for comparison, London has 37 hours while coastal locations in Cyprus have around 180 hours of sunshine in December (that is, as much as in May in London).

== Charts of selected locations ==
=== On the coast ===
Climate data for Paphos airport - near sea (Satellite view)
Month	Jan	Feb	Mar	Apr	May	Jun	Jul	Aug	Sep	Oct	Nov	Dec	Year
Mean daily maximum °C (°F)	17.0 (62.6)	16.9 (62.4)	18.5 (65.3)	21.3 (70.3)	24.4 (75.9)	27.7 (81.9)	29.9 (85.8)	30.4 (86.7)	28.8 (83.8)	26.6 (79.9)	22.4 (72.3)	18.6 (65.5)	23.6 (74.5)
Daily mean °C (°F)	12.5 (54.5)	12.3 (54.1)	13.6 (56.5)	16.3 (61.3)	19.5 (67.1)	22.8 (73.0)	25.2 (77.4)	25.7 (78.3)	23.8 (74.8)	21.5 (70.7)	17.5 (63.5)	14.2 (57.6)	18.7 (65.7)
Mean daily minimum °C (°F)	8.0 (46.4)	7.6 (45.7)	8.7 (47.7)	11.3 (52.3)	14.5 (58.1)	17.8 (64.0)	20.4 (68.7)	21.0 (69.8)	18.8 (65.8)	16.4 (61.5)	12.6 (54.7)	9.7 (49.5)	13.9 (57.0)
Average precipitation mm (inches)	80.2 (3.16)	64.2 (2.53)	34.3 (1.35)	18.7 (0.74)	5.30 (0.21)	1.60 (0.06)	0.30 (0.01)	0.00 (0.00)	3.80 (0.15)	18.0 (0.71)	66.4 (2.61)	93.9 (3.70)	386.7 (15.22)
Average precipitation days (≥ 1 mm)	9.9	8.0	5.5	4.1	1.3	0.3	0.1	0.0	0.6	2.5	5.8	8.7	46.6
Mean monthly sunshine hours	195.3	211.7	244.9	270.0	344.1	381.0	390.6	365.8	315.0	285.2	225.0	186.0	3,414.6
Source: Meteorological Service (Cyprus)

Climate data for Larnaca airport - near sea (Satellite view)
Month	Jan	Feb	Mar	Apr	May	Jun	Jul	Aug	Sep	Oct	Nov	Dec	Year
Mean daily maximum °C (°F)	16.8 (62.2)	16.8 (62.2)	19.1 (66.4)	22.5 (72.5)	26.5 (79.7)	30.3 (86.5)	32.4 (90.3)	32.7 (90.9)	30.9 (87.6)	28.1 (82.6)	22.6 (72.7)	18.3 (64.9)	24.7 (76.5)
Daily mean °C (°F)	12.1 (53.8)	11.8 (53.2)	13.9 (57.0)	17.1 (62.8)	21.2 (70.2)	25.0 (77.0)	27.3 (81.1)	27.6 (81.7)	25.4 (77.7)	22.6 (72.7)	17.5 (63.5)	13.7 (56.7)	19.6 (67.3)
Mean daily minimum °C (°F)	7.5 (45.5)	6.9 (44.4)	8.7 (47.7)	11.7 (53.1)	16.0 (60.8)	19.8 (67.6)	22.2 (72.0)	22.6 (72.7)	19.9 (67.8)	17.1 (62.8)	12.5 (54.5)	9.2 (48.6)	14.5 (58.1)
Average precipitation mm (inches)	77.6 (3.06)	40.9 (1.61)	34.4 (1.35)	17.7 (0.70)	8.80 (0.35)	2.70 (0.11)	0.60 (0.02)	0.40 (0.02)	7.10 (0.28)	13.8 (0.54)	53.1 (2.09)	94.5 (3.72)	351.5 (13.84)
Average precipitation days (≥ 1 mm)	7.9	5.7	4.5	3.1	0.7	0.3	0.1	0.1	0.5	2.1	4.7	8.0	37.6
Mean monthly sunshine hours	195.3	208.8	238.7	267.0	331.7	378.0	387.5	365.8	312.0	275.9	216.0	179.8	3,356.5
Source: Meteorological Service (Cyprus)

Climate data for Polis (Satellite view)
Month	Jan	Feb	Mar	Apr	May	Jun	Jul	Aug	Sep	Oct	Nov	Dec	Year
Mean daily maximum °C (°F)	16.4 (61.5)	16.3 (61.3)	18.5 (65.3)	21.5 (70.7)	26.1 (79.0)	30.5 (86.9)	33.5 (92.3)	33.3 (91.9)	29.9 (85.8)	26.5 (79.7)	21.9 (71.4)	17.8 (64.0)	24.3 (75.7)
Daily mean °C (°F)	12.1 (53.8)	11.8 (53.2)	13.5 (56.3)	16.3 (61.3)	20.4 (68.7)	24.7 (76.5)	27.6 (81.7)	27.6 (81.7)	24.6 (76.3)	21.4 (70.5)	17.2 (63.0)	13.6 (56.5)	19.2 (66.6)
Mean daily minimum °C (°F)	7.9 (46.2)	7.3 (45.1)	8.6 (47.5)	11.1 (52.0)	14.7 (58.5)	18.8 (65.8)	21.6 (70.9)	21.8 (71.2)	19.3 (66.7)	16.3 (61.3)	12.4 (54.3)	9.4 (48.9)	14.1 (57.4)
Average precipitation mm (inches)	79.9 (3.15)	67.1 (2.64)	37.6 (1.48)	24.7 (0.97)	7.20 (0.28)	1.50 (0.06)	0.20 (0.01)	0.00 (0.00)	4.40 (0.17)	21.8 (0.86)	55.3 (2.18)	94.4 (3.72)	394.2 (15.52)
Average precipitation days (≥ 1 mm)	10.1	8.3	6.5	4.2	1.8	0.2	0.1	0.0	0.6	2.9	5.7	9.1	49.4
Mean monthly sunshine hours	192.2	211.7	254.2	291.0	359.6	387.0	399.9	378.2	318.0	279.0	219.0	182.9	3,472.7
Source: Meteorological Service (Cyprus)

Climate data for Paralimni - ~4 km from sea, elevation: 70 m (Satellite view)
Month	Jan	Feb	Mar	Apr	May	Jun	Jul	Aug	Sep	Oct	Nov	Dec	Year
Mean daily maximum °C (°F)	16.0 (60.8)	16.1 (61.0)	18.7 (65.7)	22.2 (72.0)	26.8 (80.2)	30.8 (87.4)	33.1 (91.6)	33.3 (91.9)	31.2 (88.2)	27.7 (81.9)	21.7 (71.1)	17.3 (63.1)	24.6 (76.3)
Daily mean °C (°F)	12.3 (54.1)	12.0 (53.6)	14.2 (57.6)	17.4 (63.3)	21.8 (71.2)	25.7 (78.3)	28.2 (82.8)	28.5 (83.3)	26.1 (79.0)	22.8 (73.0)	17.6 (63.7)	13.7 (56.7)	20.0 (68.0)
Mean daily minimum °C (°F)	8.6 (47.5)	7.9 (46.2)	9.7 (49.5)	12.5 (54.5)	16.8 (62.2)	20.6 (69.1)	23.4 (74.1)	23.7 (74.7)	20.9 (69.6)	18.0 (64.4)	13.4 (56.1)	10.1 (50.2)	15.5 (59.9)
Average precipitation mm (inches)	70.0 (2.76)	62.0 (2.44)	35.0 (1.38)	15.0 (0.59)	7.50 (0.30)	2.50 (0.10)	0.50 (0.02)	0.30 (0.01)	1.20 (0.05)	25.0 (0.98)	45.0 (1.77)	87.0 (3.43)	351.0 (13.82)
Average precipitation days (≥ 1 mm)	8.2	5.6	4.7	3.5	1.2	0.3	0.1	0.1	0.6	2.5	4.9	7.3	38.9
Source: Meteorological Service (Cyprus)

Climate data for Limassol - ~1 km from sea (Satellite view)
Month	Jan	Feb	Mar	Apr	May	Jun	Jul	Aug	Sep	Oct	Nov	Dec	Year
Mean daily maximum °C (°F)	17.6 (63.7)	17.8 (64.0)	20.0 (68.0)	22.9 (73.2)	26.9 (80.4)	30.8 (87.4)	33.2 (91.8)	33.3 (91.9)	31.3 (88.3)	28.6 (83.5)	23.5 (74.3)	18.9 (66.0)	25.4 (77.7)
Daily mean °C (°F)	13.2 (55.8)	13.1 (55.6)	15.2 (59.4)	18.0 (64.4)	21.8 (71.2)	25.5 (77.9)	27.8 (82.0)	28.0 (82.4)	26.0 (78.8)	23.2 (73.8)	18.5 (65.3)	14.5 (58.1)	20.4 (68.7)
Mean daily minimum °C (°F)	8.8 (47.8)	8.5 (47.3)	10.4 (50.7)	13.1 (55.6)	16.7 (62.1)	20.1 (68.2)	22.4 (72.3)	22.7 (72.9)	20.6 (69.1)	17.7 (63.9)	13.5 (56.3)	10.1 (50.2)	15.4 (59.7)
Average precipitation mm (inches)	86.7 (3.41)	66.9 (2.63)	35.8 (1.41)	18.4 (0.72)	5.1 (0.20)	1.4 (0.06)	0.0 (0.0)	0.0 (0.0)	2.9 (0.11)	13.1 (0.52)	77.5 (3.05)	99.7 (3.93)	407.5 (16.04)
Average precipitation days (≥ 1 mm)	9.3	7.1	5.6	3.3	1.1	0.2	0.0	0.0	0.3	1.9	5.5	8.8	43.1
Source: Meteorological Service (Cyprus)

=== Inland ===
Climate data for Nicosia, elevation: 162 m (Satellite view)
Month	Jan	Feb	Mar	Apr	May	Jun	Jul	Aug	Sep	Oct	Nov	Dec	Year
Mean daily maximum °C (°F)	15.5 (59.9)	15.9 (60.6)	19.2 (66.6)	24.0 (75.2)	29.7 (85.5)	34.3 (93.7)	37.2 (99.0)	36.9 (98.4)	33.9 (93.0)	29.0 (84.2)	22.1 (71.8)	17.0 (62.6)	26.2 (79.2)
Daily mean °C (°F)	10.6 (51.1)	10.6 (51.1)	13.1 (55.6)	17.1 (62.8)	22.3 (72.1)	26.9 (80.4)	29.7 (85.5)	29.4 (84.9)	26.2 (79.2)	22.3 (72.1)	16.3 (61.3)	12.0 (53.6)	19.7 (67.5)
Mean daily minimum °C (°F)	5.7 (42.3)	5.2 (41.4)	7.0 (44.6)	10.2 (50.4)	14.8 (58.6)	19.4 (66.9)	22.2 (72.0)	21.9 (71.4)	18.8 (65.8)	15.6 (60.1)	10.4 (50.7)	7.1 (44.8)	13.2 (55.8)
Average precipitation mm (inches)	54.7 (2.15)	41.6 (1.64)	28.3 (1.11)	19.9 (0.78)	23.5 (0.93)	17.6 (0.69)	5.80 (0.23)	1.30 (0.05)	11.7 (0.46)	17.4 (0.69)	54.6 (2.15)	65.8 (2.59)	342.2 (13.47)
Average precipitation days (≥ 1 mm)	7.3	6.5	5.4	3.5	2.7	1.3	0.5	0.1	0.6	2.8	4.7	7.7	43.1
Mean monthly sunshine hours	182.9	200.1	238.7	267.0	331.7	369.0	387.5	365.8	312.0	275.9	213.0	170.5	3,314.1
Source: Meteorological Service (Cyprus)

Climate data for Saittas near Moniatis and Trimiklini, elevation: 640 m (Satellite view)
Month	Jan	Feb	Mar	Apr	May	Jun	Jul	Aug	Sep	Oct	Nov	Dec	Year
Mean daily maximum °C (°F)	13.6 (56.5)	13.9 (57.0)	17.1 (62.8)	21.5 (70.7)	27.0 (80.6)	31.5 (88.7)	34.6 (94.3)	34.3 (93.7)	31.2 (88.2)	26.8 (80.2)	20.2 (68.4)	15.2 (59.4)	23.9 (75.0)
Daily mean °C (°F)	8.4 (47.1)	8.5 (47.3)	10.9 (51.6)	14.8 (58.6)	19.6 (67.3)	23.8 (74.8)	26.8 (80.2)	26.5 (79.7)	23.4 (74.1)	19.7 (67.5)	14.1 (57.4)	10.0 (50.0)	17.2 (63.0)
Mean daily minimum °C (°F)	3.2 (37.8)	3.1 (37.6)	4.7 (40.5)	8.0 (46.4)	12.2 (54.0)	16.1 (61.0)	18.9 (66.0)	18.7 (65.7)	15.7 (60.3)	12.5 (54.5)	8.1 (46.6)	4.7 (40.5)	10.5 (50.9)
Average precipitation mm (inches)	117.6 (4.63)	89.0 (3.50)	70.3 (2.77)	38.4 (1.51)	20.1 (0.79)	27.2 (1.07)	4.9 (0.19)	10.3 (0.41)	11.7 (0.46)	25.7 (1.01)	93.9 (3.70)	144.0 (5.67)	653.2 (25.72)
Average precipitation days (≥ 1 mm)	10.3	9.1	8.4	5.5	2.7	2.1	0.7	1.1	1.4	3.3	7.0	9.2	60.9
Mean monthly sunshine hours	142.6	168.2	213.9	261.0	310.0	351.0	362.7	347.2	300.0	248.0	165.0	124.0	2,993.6
Source: Meteorological Service (Cyprus)

Climate data for Prodromos in Troodos Mountains, elevation: 1380 m (Satellite view)
Month	Jan	Feb	Mar	Apr	May	Jun	Jul	Aug	Sep	Oct	Nov	Dec	Year
Mean daily maximum °C (°F)	6.3 (43.3)	6.6 (43.9)	10.3 (50.5)	15.1 (59.2)	20.5 (68.9)	25.0 (77.0)	28.1 (82.6)	27.9 (82.2)	24.4 (75.9)	19.6 (67.3)	12.8 (55.0)	8.0 (46.4)	17.1 (62.8)
Daily mean °C (°F)	3.5 (38.3)	3.5 (38.3)	6.6 (43.9)	10.7 (51.3)	15.8 (60.4)	20.1 (68.2)	23.3 (73.9)	23.1 (73.6)	19.6 (67.3)	15.4 (59.7)	9.5 (49.1)	5.3 (41.5)	13.0 (55.4)
Mean daily minimum °C (°F)	0.7 (33.3)	0.3 (32.5)	2.8 (37.0)	6.3 (43.3)	11.1 (52.0)	15.2 (59.4)	18.4 (65.1)	18.2 (64.8)	14.9 (58.8)	11.3 (52.3)	6.2 (43.2)	2.5 (36.5)	9.0 (48.2)
Average precipitation mm (inches)	133.4 (5.25)	123.6 (4.87)	82.3 (3.24)	56.9 (2.24)	26.0 (1.02)	40.0 (1.57)	12.1 (0.48)	10.0 (0.39)	9.5 (0.37)	24.0 (0.94)	102.5 (4.04)	169.7 (6.68)	790.1 (31.11)
Average precipitation days (≥ 1 mm)	12.4	11.2	9.8	6.7	3.7	2.1	0.7	0.7	1.4	3.5	7.4	11.2	70.7
Mean monthly sunshine hours	130.2	150.8	195.3	231.0	275.9	315.0	328.6	310.0	255.0	220.1	165.0	136.4	2,713.3
Source: Meteorological Service (Cyprus)

== Precipitation ==
The higher mountain areas are cooler and moister than the rest of the island. They receive the heaviest annual rainfall, which may be as much as 1,000 millimeters (39.4 in). Sharp frost also occurs in the higher districts, which are usually blanketed with snow during the first months of the year. Precipitation increases from 450 millimeters (17.7 in) up the south-western windward slopes to nearly 1,100 millimeters (43.3 in) at the top of the Troodos massif. The narrow ridge of the Kyrenia range, stretching 160 km (99 mi) from west to east along the extreme north of the island produces a relatively small increase in rainfall of around 550 millimeters (21.7 in) along its ridge at an elevation of 1,000 meters (3,281 ft). Plains along the northern coast and in the Karpass Peninsula area average 400 to 450 millimeters (15.7 to 17.7 in) of annual rainfall. The least rainfall occurs in the Mesaoria, with 300 to 400 millimeters (11.8 to 15.7 in) a year. Variability in annual rainfall is characteristic for the island, however, and droughts are frequent and sometimes severe. Statistical analysis of rainfall in Cyprus reveals a decreasing trend of rainfall amounts in the last 30 years.

Rainfall in the warmer months contributes little or nothing to water resources and agriculture. Autumn and winter rainfall, on which agriculture and water supply generally depend, is somewhat variable from year to year.

== Other information ==
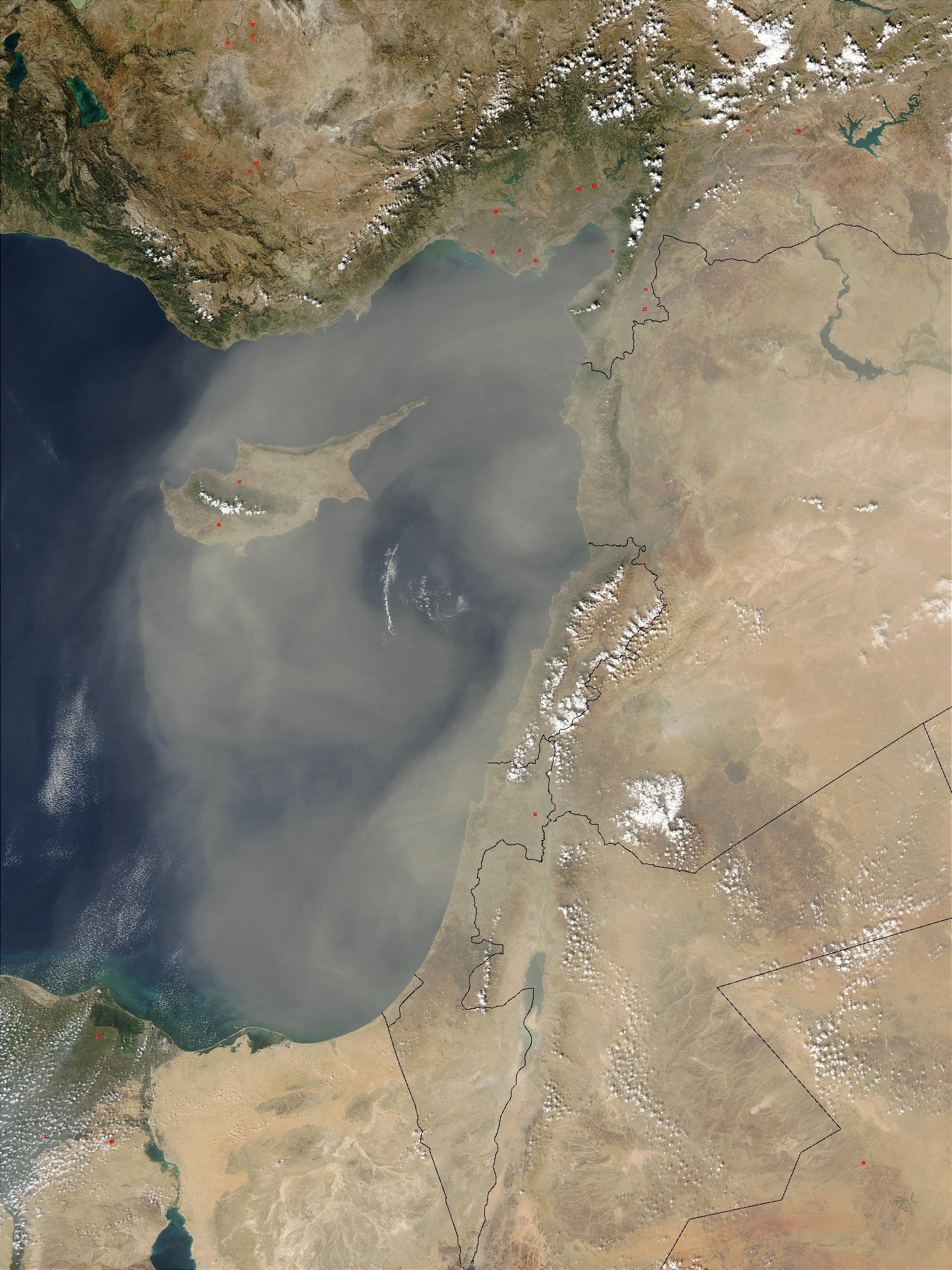
Sandstorm in the Levant, October 19, 2002

The Mediterranean climate, warm and rather dry, with rainfall mainly between November and March, favors agriculture. In general, the island experiences mild wet winters and dry hot summers. Variations in temperature and rainfall are governed by altitude and, to a lesser extent, distance from the coast. Hot, dry summers from mid-May to mid-September and rainy, rather changeable winters from November to mid-March are separated by short autumn and spring seasons.

In summer the island is mainly under the influence of a shallow trough of low pressure extending from the great continental depression centred over Western Asia. It is a season of high temperatures with almost cloudless skies.

In winter Cyprus is near the track of fairly frequent small depressions which cross the Mediterranean Sea from west to east between the continental anticyclone of Eurasia and the generally low pressure belt of North Africa. These depressions give periods of disturbed weather usually lasting for a day or so and produce most of the annual precipitation, the average rainfall from December to February being about 60% of the average annual total precipitation for the island as a whole, which is 500 millimeters (19.7 in).

== Humidity ==
Relative humidity of the air is on average between 60% and 80% in winter and between 40% and 60% in summer with even lower values over inland areas around midday. Fog is infrequent and visibility is generally very good. Sunshine is abundant during the whole year and particularly from April to September when the average duration of bright sunshine exceeds 12 hours per day.

== Winds ==
Winds are generally light to moderate and variable in direction. Strong winds may occur sometimes, but gales are infrequent over Cyprus and are mainly confined to exposed coastal areas as well as areas at high elevation.

== Carbon waste emissions ==
In 2024, carbon waste emissions (excluding LULUCF and excluding emissions from forestry and land use change) rank and amount in the Cyprus island are recorded as:
Republic of Cyprus: 109th 1.92 MT CO2e
Turkish Republic of Northern Cyprus: 210th 13301.70 T CO2e
(Note: 1. China: 394.77 MT CO2e; 2. the US: 161.72 MT CO2e; 50. Kenya: 6.96 MT CO2e; 100. Niger: 2.42 MT CO2e; 150. Djibouti 554235.76 T CO2e; 200. Dominica 30419.80 T CO2e)

== Temperature and precipitation charts ==
Paphos

Climate chart (precipitation, max. and min. temperature)
J	F	M	A	M	J	J	A	S	O	N	D
80 17 8	64 17 8	34 19 9	19 21 11	5.3 24 15	1.6 28 18	0.3 30 20	0 30 21	3.8 29 19	18 27 16	66 23 13	94 19 10
- █ Average max. and min. temperatures in °C
- █ Precipitation totals in mm
- Source: World Meteorological Organization
Imperial conversion
J	F	M	A	M	J	J	A	S	O	N	D
3.2 63 46	2.5 62 46	1.4 65 48	0.7 70 52	0.2 76 58	0.1 82 64	0 86 69	0 87 70	0.1 84 66	0.7 80 62	2.6 73 55	3.7 65 49
- █ Average max. and min. temperatures in °F
- █ Precipitation totals in inches

Larnaca

Climate chart (precipitation, max. and min. temperature)
J	F	M	A	M	J	J	A	S	O	N	D
78 17 8	41 17 7	34 19 9	18 23 12	8.8 27 16	2.7 30 20	0.6 32 22	0.4 33 23	7.1 31 20	14 28 17	53 23 13	95 18 9
- █ Average max. and min. temperatures in °C
- █ Precipitation totals in mm
- Source: World Meteorological Organization
Imperial conversion
J	F	M	A	M	J	J	A	S	O	N	D
3.1 62 46	1.6 62 44	1.4 66 48	0.7 73 53	0.3 80 61	0.1 87 68	0 90 72	0 91 73	0.3 88 68	0.5 83 63	2.1 73 55	3.7 65 49
- █ Average max. and min. temperatures in °F
- █ Precipitation totals in inches

Limassol

Climate chart (precipitation, max. and min. temperature)
J	F	M	A	M	J	J	A	S	O	N	D
87 18 9	67 18 9	36 20 10	18 23 13	5.1 27 17	1.4 31 20	0 33 22	0 33 23	2.9 31 21	13 29 18	78 24 14	100 19 10
- █ Average max. and min. temperatures in °C
- █ Precipitation totals in mm
- Source: World Meteorological Organization
Imperial conversion
J	F	M	A	M	J	J	A	S	O	N	D
3.4 64 48	2.6 64 47	1.4 68 51	0.7 73 56	0.2 80 62	0.1 87 68	0 92 72	0 92 73	0.1 88 69	0.5 83 64	3.1 74 56	3.9 66 50
- █ Average max. and min. temperatures in °F
- █ Precipitation totals in inches

Nicosia

Climate chart (precipitation, max. and min. temperature)
J	F	M	A	M	J	J	A	S	O	N	D
48 15 5	47 16 5	37 19 6	22 24 10	22 30 15	7 34 19	1 37 22	7 37 22	6 34 19	22 28 15	31 22 10	58 17 7
- █ Average max. and min. temperatures in °C
- █ Precipitation totals in mm
- Source: World Meteorological Organization
Imperial conversion
J	F	M	A	M	J	J	A	S	O	N	D
1.9 60 41	1.9 61 41	1.5 66 44	0.9 76 50	0.9 86 58	0.3 93 66	0 98 71	0.3 98 71	0.2 92 65	0.9 83 59	1.2 71 50	2.3 63 44
- █ Average max. and min. temperatures in °F
- █ Precipitation totals in inches

Troodos Mountains

Climate chart (precipitation, max. and min. temperature)
J	F	M	A	M	J	J	A	S	O	N	D
133 6 1	124 7 0	82 10 3	57 15 6	26 21 11	40 25 15	12 28 18	10 28 18	9.5 24 15	24 20 11	103 13 6	170 8 3
- █ Average max. and min. temperatures in °C
- █ Precipitation totals in mm
- Source: World Meteorological Organization
Imperial conversion
J	F	M	A	M	J	J	A	S	O	N	D
5.3 43 34	4.9 45 32	3.2 50 37	2.2 59 43	1 70 52	1.6 77 59	0.5 82 64	0.4 82 64	0.4 75 59	0.9 68 52	4 55 43	6.7 46 37
- █ Average max. and min. temperatures in °F
- █ Precipitation totals in inches

Amargeti

Climate chart (precipitation, max. and min. temperature)
J	F	M	A	M	J	J	A	S	O	N	D
145 15 6	93 15 6	73 17 7	29 21 10	16 25 13	5 29 17	2 31 19	1 32 19	6 29 17	39 25 14	60 21 11	142 17 8
- █ Average max. and min. temperatures in °C
- █ Precipitation totals in mm
- Source: Climate Data
Imperial conversion
J	F	M	A	M	J	J	A	S	O	N	D
5.7 58 43	3.7 59 43	2.9 62 45	1.1 69 49	0.6 76 55	0.2 84 62	0.1 89 65	0 89 66	0.2 84 62	1.5 77 57	2.4 70 51	5.6 62 46
- █ Average max. and min. temperatures in °F
- █ Precipitation totals in inches

== See also ==
- Climate change in Cyprus
