= Trimiklini =

Trimiklini Τριμίκλινη
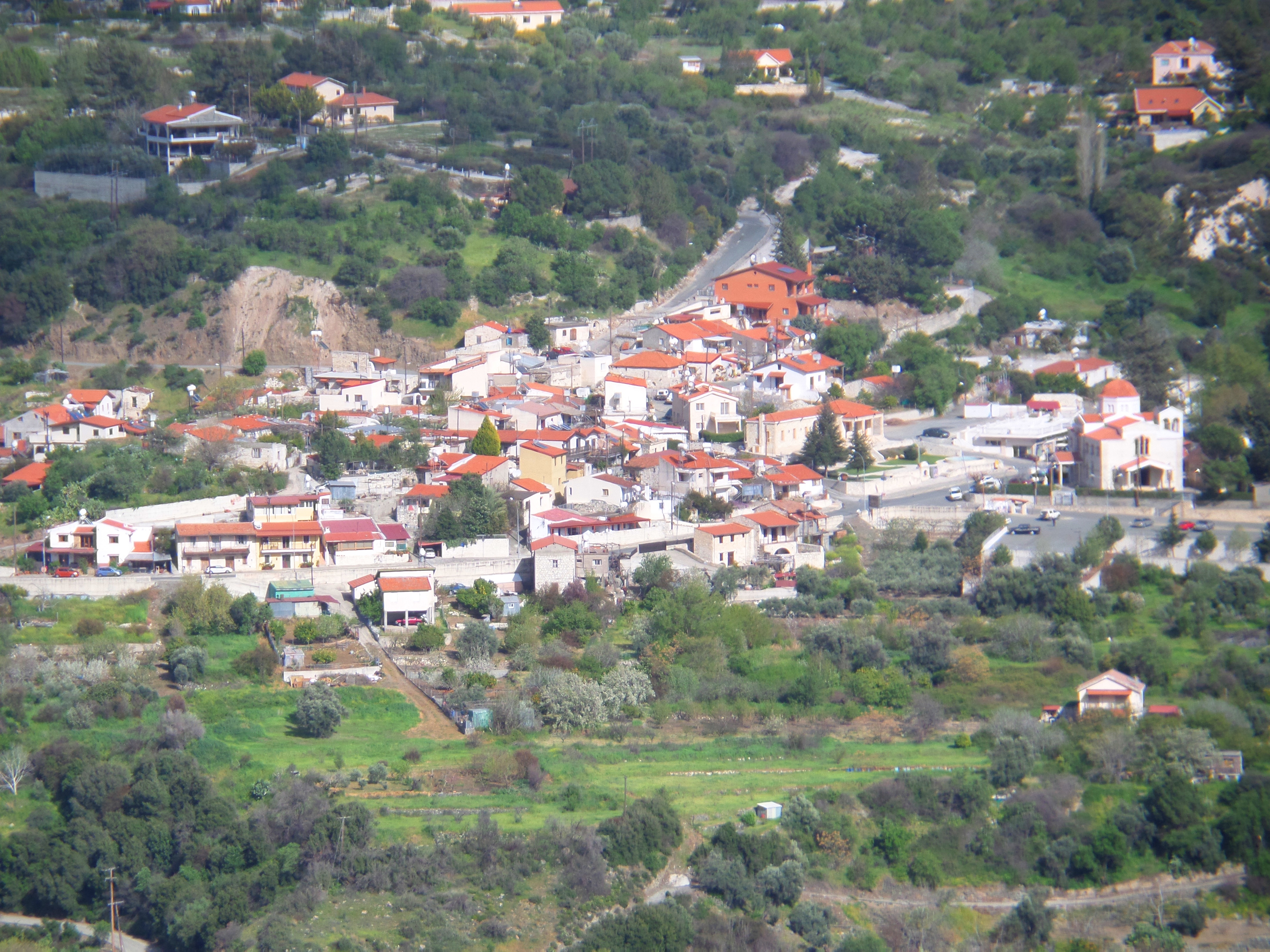

- Location in Cyprus
- Coordinates: 34°50′49″N 32°54′42″E
- Country: Cyprus
- District: Limassol District

Population (2021)
  - Total: 353
- Time zone: UTC+2 (EET)
  - Summer (DST): UTC+3 (EEST)
- Website: Official website

Trimiklini (Greek: Τριμίκλινη) is a village in the Limassol District of Cyprus, located 9 km south of Pano Platres.

== Location ==
Trimiklini is situated 27 kilometres north-west of the city of Limassol. The village is built at an altitude of 545 metres above sea level. Trimiklini lies on the main Limassol-Platres-Troodos road, which connects it with the city of Limassol and all the mountain resorts of Troodos. It borders Laneia to the south, Silikou and Kouka to the west, Moniatis to the north, Pelendri to the north-east, and Agia Mamas to the east.

== Natural Environment ==
Trimiklini is surrounded by a continuous range of high mountain peaks, the highest of which is Zalakas. To the south of the community there is a large gorge through which the Kouris River flows.

Vineyards (both wine and table grape varieties), almond trees, olive trees and fruit trees are cultivated in the village. The main agricultural produce includes peaches, nectarines, pears and plums. The wine and zivania (Cypriot pomace brandy) produced by the villagers using traditional methods are well known.

The village's crops are irrigated by the Trimiklini Dam, which has a capacity of 340,000 cubic metres. The dam remains full throughout the year, forming a large lake that serves as a habitat for various bird species during the summer months.

== Places ==
In Trimiklini, there is an ancient bridge built in the bed of the Kouris River, dating to the Venetian period. The bridge is constructed from stones taken from the riverbed and consists of three successive arches. According to Christian tradition, Saint Helen crossed this bridge on her way from Stavrovouni, carrying the Holy Cross and the sacred kannavos (the rope with which Christ was bound to the Cross) to the ancient Monastery of the Cross in the neighbouring village of Kouka and to Omodos.

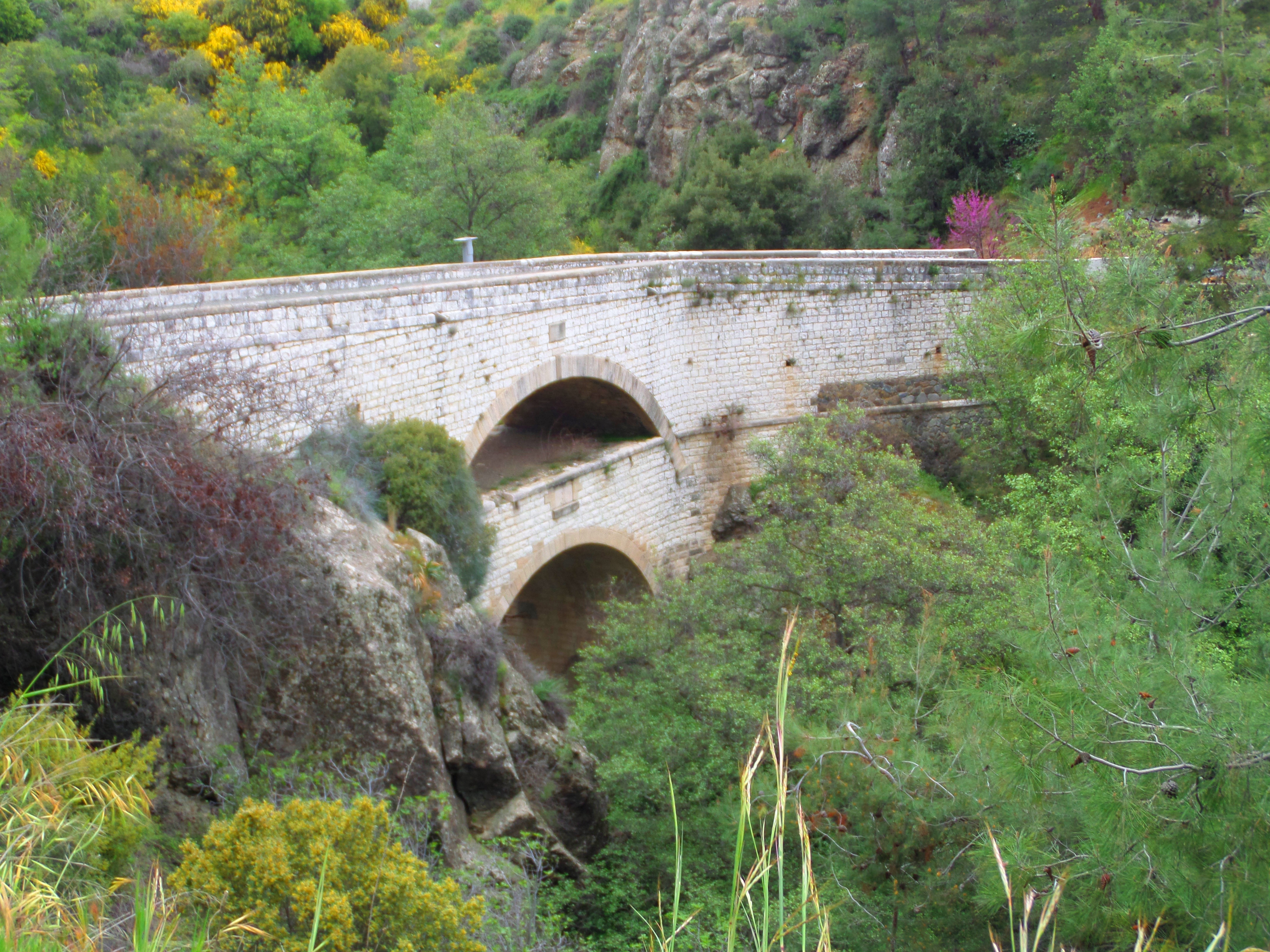
Double Bridge in Trimiklini.

In addition, on the boundary between Trimiklini and Moniatis stands Cyprus's only double bridge. It was constructed in 1901 and was originally used by carts. In 1917 it was upgraded to allow the passage of motor vehicles, when such vehicles first appeared on the island. An important building in the village is the first primary school, which was constructed in 1926 from local stone. The building has been restored.

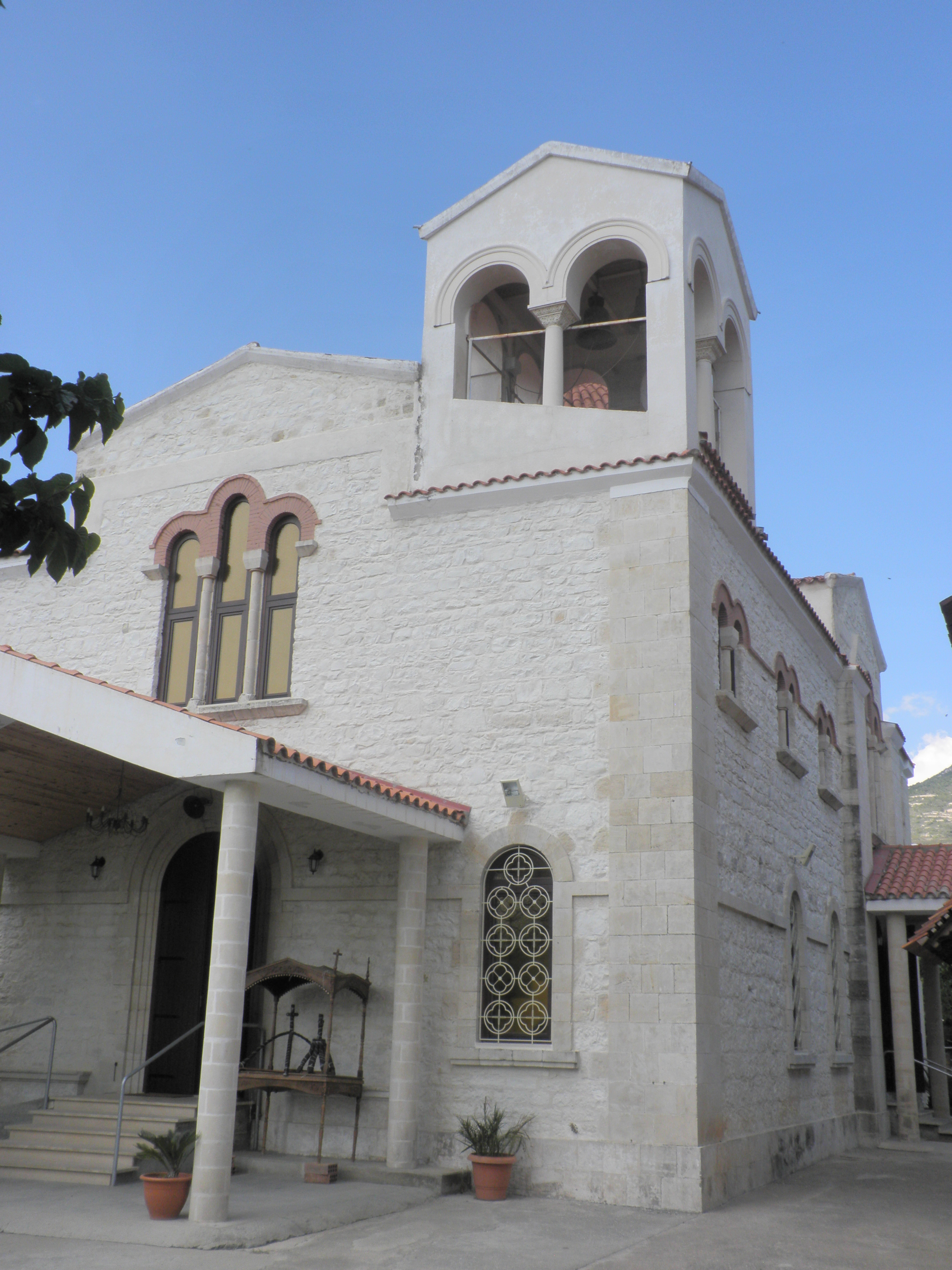
church Panayias Eleousis

Trimiklini is also known for its traditional roadside market, which operates daily beside the Limassol-Troodos road. The market offers traditional products such as zivania, wines, soutzoukos, a wide variety of sweets, and all the fruits produced by the villagers.

== Climate ==
Climate data for Saittas near Trimiklini, elevation: 640 m (Satellite view)
Month	Jan	Feb	Mar	Apr	May	Jun	Jul	Aug	Sep	Oct	Nov	Dec	Year
Mean daily maximum °C (°F)	13.6 (56.5)	13.9 (57.0)	17.1 (62.8)	21.5 (70.7)	27.0 (80.6)	31.5 (88.7)	34.6 (94.3)	34.1 (93.4)	31.2 (88.2)	26.8 (80.2)	20.2 (68.4)	15.2 (59.4)	23.9 (75.0)
Daily mean °C (°F)	8.4 (47.1)	8.5 (47.3)	10.9 (51.6)	14.8 (58.6)	19.6 (67.3)	23.8 (74.8)	26.8 (80.2)	26.5 (79.7)	23.4 (74.1)	19.7 (67.5)	14.1 (57.4)	10.0 (50.0)	17.2 (63.0)
Mean daily minimum °C (°F)	3.2 (37.8)	3.1 (37.6)	4.7 (40.5)	8.0 (46.4)	12.2 (54.0)	16.1 (61.0)	18.9 (66.0)	18.7 (65.7)	15.7 (60.3)	12.5 (54.5)	8.1 (46.6)	4.7 (40.5)	10.5 (50.9)
Average precipitation mm (inches)	117.6 (4.63)	89.0 (3.50)	70.3 (2.77)	38.4 (1.51)	20.1 (0.79)	27.2 (1.07)	4.9 (0.19)	10.3 (0.41)	11.7 (0.46)	25.7 (1.01)	93.9 (3.70)	144.0 (5.67)	653.2 (25.72)
Average precipitation days (≥ 1 mm)	10.3	9.1	8.4	5.5	2.7	2.1	0.7	1.1	1.4	3.3	7.0	9.2	60.9
Mean monthly sunshine hours	142.6	168.2	213.9	261.0	310.0	351.0	362.7	347.2	300.0	248.0	165.0	124.0	2,993.6
Source: Meteorological Service (Cyprus)
