= Chronicle of Amadi =

The Chronicle of Amadi or simply Amadi (or Istoria del regno di Cipro, 'History of the kingdom of Cyprus') is an anonymous chronicle written around 1520 in Italian prose with some Venetian traits. Its one of the major sources on the Frankish Kingdom of Cyprus under the Lusignan dynasty (1192–1489). The text details the history of Cyprus starting from the Byzantine Emperor Heraclius and his wars against the Sassanids for the recovery of the Holy Cross in the seventh century to the wedding of King John II and Helena Palaiologina on 3 February 1441, closely following the closing date of the 15th century Greek chronicle of Leontios Machairas. Additionally, it includes a short account of the history of the crusader kingdom of Jerusalem from its foundation onwards. The codex contains Italian excerpts and translations of a number of narrative histories from the Latin East. These include William of Tyre's Eracles, the Annales de Terre Sainte, Philip of Novara's Estoire et le droit conte de la guerre qui fu entre l’empereur, and the anonymously authored Chronique d’un Templier de Tyr.

The Chronicle exists in a single mid-16th century manuscript at the Biblioteca Nazionale Marciana in Venice (It. VI, 157 (=6895) ). Although the text is known as the Chronicle of Amadi, the Venetian Francesco Amadi (d. 1566) was not the author of the text but only the owner of the extant manuscript. There is a 19th century copy of the manuscript at the Bibliothèque nationale de France in Paris (It. 387) commissioned by Luis de Mas Latrie. It was first published in the original Italian in 1891 by René de Mas Latrie, son of French historian Louis de Mas Latrie and in 2015 it was published in an English translation from the Italian by Nicolas Coureas and Peter Edbury.

== Editions ==
- de Mas Latrie, R. 1891. Chroniques d'Amadi et de Strambaldi. Publiées par M. René de Mas Latrie. Premier partie Chronicle d'Amadi. Paris: Imprimerie Nationale.
- Papadopoullos, T. (ed.) 1999. Francesco Amadi, Cronaca di Cipro. Nicosia: Arch. Makarios III Foundation.
- Coureas, N. & Edbury, P. 2015. The Chronicle of Amadi, translated from the Italian. Texts and Studies in the History of Cyprus LXXIV. Nicosia: Cyprus Research Centre.

== See also ==
- Leontios Machairas
- Georgios Boustronios
- Florio Bustron
- Stefano Lusignan
