= Archimandrite Kyprianos =

Greek Cypriot historian and cleric

Archimandrite Kyprianos (Greek: Αρχιμανδρίτης Κυπριανός) (1735 – 1803 est.) was a cleric, historian, poet, and publishing editor. He was one of the major Greek Cypriot intellectuals and clerics of the 18th century.

He was born in the village of Koilani in the Limassol District. He possibly took monastic orders in the Monastery of Kykko. He started his career in the church as a deacon in the Cypriot Archbishopric. Later on as an archimandrite, he was sent in 1777 by Archbishop Chrysanthos to study in Venice. While in Venice in 1780, he edited and wrote the introduction to Theophilos Korydaleus' treatise on Aristotle's On Generation and Corruption a work sponsored by Archbishop Chrysanthos and the Pafos bishop, Panaretos. In Venice, he also worked on correcting books published in the Greek language. He furthered his studies in Padua, and from 1794 to 1798, he was a senior cleric in the Greek Orthodox church of Trieste.

His most notable work is considered to be the Chronological history of Cyprus (Ιστορία Χρονολογική της Νήσου Κύπρου) published in Venice in 1788. This book was subsequently published in four different editions. His work was something of a response to the Choroggrafia of Stefano Lusignan, a high ranking catholic official, and thus stresses the orthodox identity and Byzantine heritage of the island of Cyprus.

== Publications ==
- Αρχιμανδρίτης Κυπριανός (1788). Ἱστορία Χρονολογικὴ τῆς Νήσου Κύπρου. Ενετίησιν: παρά Νικόλαω Γλυκεί.
- Αρχιμανδρίτης Κυπριανός (1902). Ἱστορία Χρονολογικὴ τῆς Νήσου Κύπρου. Εν Λευκωσία. Reprint.

== See also ==
- Neophytos Rodinos
- Florio Bustron
