= Kouka, Cyprus =

Kouka Κουκά
- Village
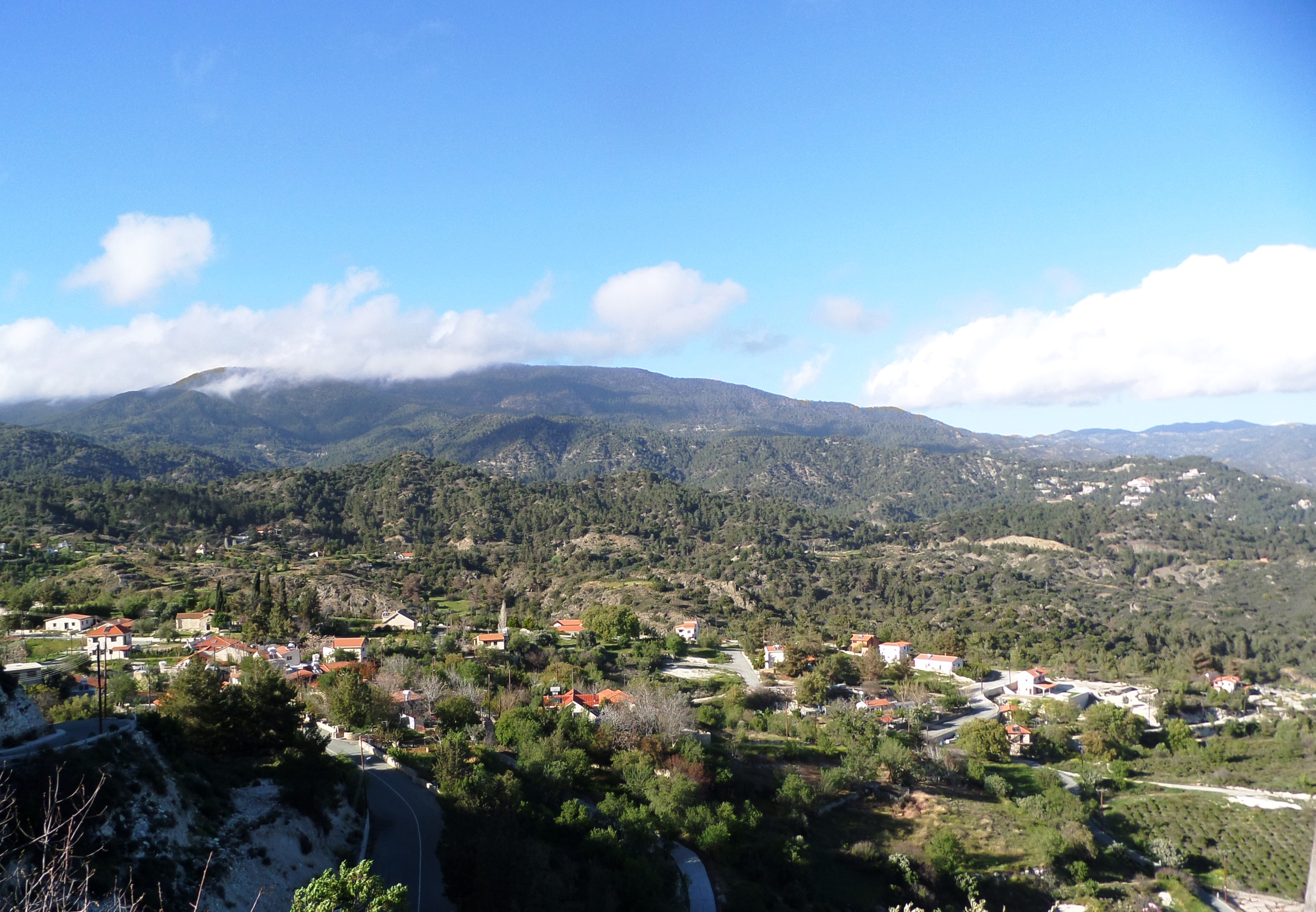

- Location in Cyprus
- Coordinates: 34°51′2″N 32°53′13″E
- Country: Cyprus
- District: Limassol District
- Elevation: 2,533 ft (772 m)

Population (2012)
  - Total: Appr. 30
- Time zone: UTC+2 (EET)
  - Summer (DST): UTC+3 (EEST)
- Website: http://www.kouka.com.cy/

Kouka (Greek: Κουκά) is a small village in the Limassol District of Cyprus, in the foothills of the Troodos Mountains on the western slopes of the Kouris Valley. The village is 2 km south of Pera Pedi on the road to Sylikou, and it is home to the church of Timios Stavros (Holy Cross).

== History ==
The village is located 25 km from Limassol and only a few minutes from Platres and the Troodos mountains. Kouka is in the middle of the villages of Koilani, Pera Pedi, Sylikou, Moniatis, Saittas and Trimiklini.

It is included among the wine producing villages of Limassol District and it is surrounded by vines, pine trees and oak trees, some of which are over 100 years old.

The village hosts the Timios Stavros Monastery, founded during the years of Saint Helena, the mother of Constantine the Great, who visited the island in the year 327 AD. The most important chroniclers and historians of Cyprus, Leontios Machairas, Georgios Boustronios and Archimandrite Kyprianos, document the Monastery and the Holy Cross of the church, on which were kept pieces from the Holy Wood that Saint Helena gifted to the village.

Kouka derives its name from the word "Koka", the type of hair of a noble man who had most of the village as his property, probably during the Venetian period in Cyprus.
