= Constantine Sathas =

Greek historian (1842–1914)

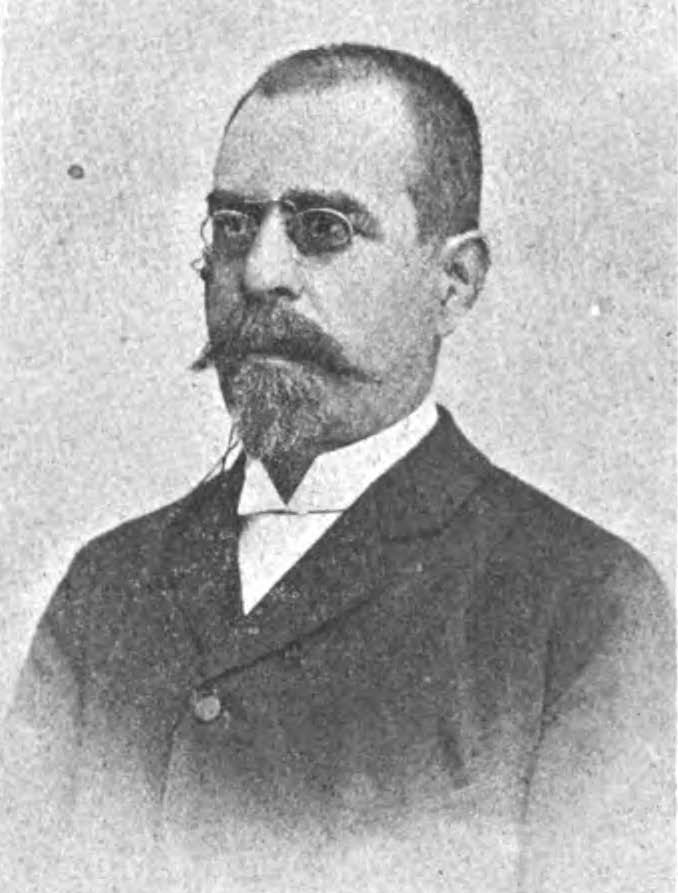
- Photo in Hestia magazine, 1894
- Born: 1842; Athens
- Died: 25 May 1914 (aged 71–72); Paris
- Occupations: Historian, researcher

Constantine Sathas (Greek: Κωνσταντίνος Σάθας; Athens, 1842 – Paris, 25 May 1914) was a Greek historian and researcher.

Sathas spent his life unearthing hitherto unknown material pertaining to the history of late medieval and early modern Greece that he later published. He researched archives in Greece, Constantinople (now Istanbul), Venice and Florence. In 1900, he moved to Paris, where he lived until his death.

Many of the numerous documents he brought to light still remain primary sources of information. It can be argued that his work was never fully appreciated and some of his views are regarded eccentric nowadays. Yet, he carried out groundbreaking work and has been considered as the best historian of Greece in the 19th century. He published the first editions of the Cypriot Medieval chronicles of Leontios Machairas and Georgios Boustronios.

== Selected works ==
=== In Greek ===
- The Revolution of the Greek nation in 17th century, Athens, 1865.
- The chronicle of Galaxeidi, 1865.
- Hellenika Anekdota (Unpublished Greek texts), (2 volumes), 1867.
- New Greek Philology. Biographies of illustrious literary Greeks from ... 1453 to 1821. 1868.
- Greece under Turkish occupation, 1869.
- Medieval Library (7 volumes), 1872–1894.
- Historical essay on the theatre and music of the Byzantines, 1878.
- Cretan theatre, or a collection of unpublished and unknown dramata, 1879.
- Greek Stratioti in the West and the revival of the Greek military tactics, 1885.

=== In French ===
- Documents inédits relatifs à l'histoire de la Grèce au Moyen Âge publiés sous les auspices de la Chambre des députés de Grèce, Paris, 1880–1890. 9 volumes in French, Italian and Latin languages.
- Sur les Commentaires byzantins sur Menandre, Homere, etc.: Notice et textes grecs inédits, Paris, 1876.
- Deux lettres inedites de l'empereur Michel Ducas Parapinace à Robert Guiscard rédigées par Michel Psellus, Paris, 1875.
- La tradition hellenique et la legende de Phidias de Praxitele et de la fille d'Hippocrate au moyen age, Paris, 1875.
- Les exploits de Digenis Akritas: Epopee byzantine du dixième siècle / publiée pour la première fois d'après le manuscrit unique de Trebizonde., Athens, 1875. (with Emile Legrand)

=== In English ===
- He collaborated with J.B. Bury and others for an edition of the History of Michael Psellus (Methuen & Co. London, 1899).
