= Moniatis =

Moniatis Μονιάτης Monyat
- village
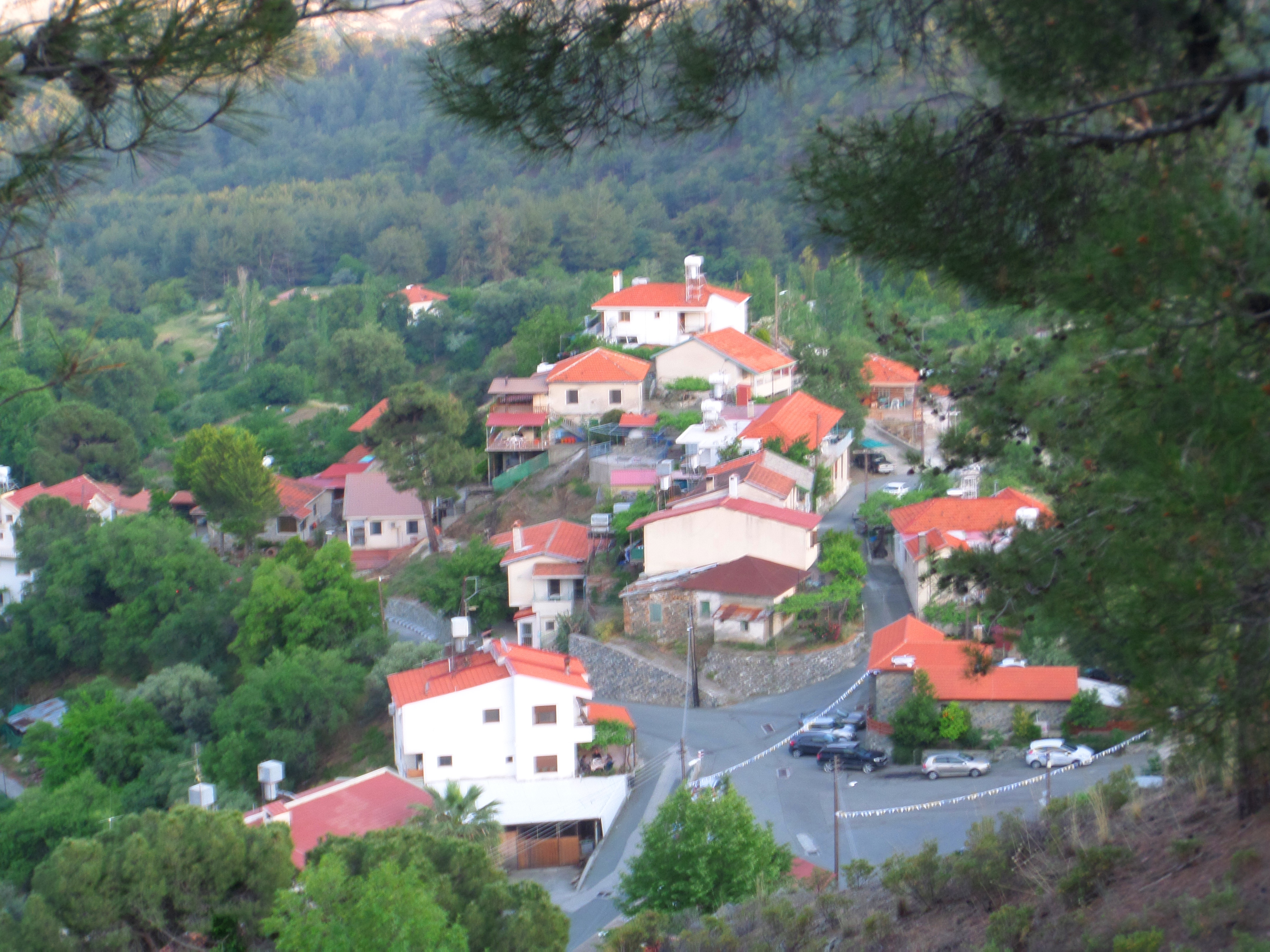

- Location in Cyprus
- Coordinates: 34°52′7″N 32°53′49″E
- Country: Cyprus
- District: Limassol District

Population (2001)
  - Total: 227
- Time zone: UTC+2 (EET)
  - Summer (DST): UTC+3 (EEST)

Moniatis (Greek: Μονιάτης, Turkish: Monyat) is a village in the Limassol District of Cyprus, located 5 km southeast of Pano Platres. Moniatis was historically a mixed village of Greek Cypriots and Turkish Cypriots. The origin of the name is possibly due to the monasteries around it, "mones".

== History ==
During the Kingdom of Cyprus, the chronicler Florio Bustron writes that King James II after 1464 granted Moniatis as a fief to Juan Perez Fabriges, together with other villages, among them Knodara, Kouka, Agios Andronikos of Akaki, Malia, Karpasso, Anglisides and Selino.

In 1958, under the Taksim policy, the village was renamed "Elmalı" by the Turkish Cypriots, meaning place with apples. Its 100 to 110-strong Turkish Cypriot population was displaced as a result of the intercommunal violence in 1963, during which they fled the village to Limassol, and the Turkish invasion of Cyprus in 1974, after which they were transferred to the north.

== Climate ==
Climate data for Saittas near Moniatis, elevation: 640 m (Satellite view)
Month	Jan	Feb	Mar	Apr	May	Jun	Jul	Aug	Sep	Oct	Nov	Dec	Year
Mean daily maximum °C (°F)	13.6 (56.5)	13.9 (57.0)	17.1 (62.8)	21.5 (70.7)	27.0 (80.6)	31.5 (88.7)	34.6 (94.3)	34.3 (93.7)	31.2 (88.2)	26.8 (80.2)	20.2 (68.4)	15.2 (59.4)	23.9 (75.0)
Daily mean °C (°F)	8.4 (47.1)	8.5 (47.3)	10.9 (51.6)	14.8 (58.6)	19.6 (67.3)	23.8 (74.8)	26.8 (80.2)	26.5 (79.7)	23.4 (74.1)	19.7 (67.5)	14.1 (57.4)	10.0 (50.0)	17.2 (63.0)
Mean daily minimum °C (°F)	3.2 (37.8)	3.1 (37.6)	4.7 (40.5)	8.0 (46.4)	12.2 (54.0)	16.1 (61.0)	18.9 (66.0)	18.7 (65.7)	15.7 (60.3)	12.5 (54.5)	8.1 (46.6)	4.7 (40.5)	10.5 (50.9)
Average precipitation mm (inches)	117.6 (4.63)	89.0 (3.50)	70.3 (2.77)	38.4 (1.51)	20.1 (0.79)	27.2 (1.07)	4.9 (0.19)	10.3 (0.41)	11.7 (0.46)	25.7 (1.01)	93.9 (3.70)	144.0 (5.67)	653.2 (25.72)
Average precipitation days (≥ 1 mm)	10.3	9.1	8.4	5.5	2.7	2.1	0.7	1.1	1.4	3.3	7.0	9.2	60.9
Mean monthly sunshine hours	142.6	168.2	213.9	261.0	310.0	351.0	362.7	347.2	300.0	248.0	165.0	124.0	2,993.6
Source: Meteorological Service (Cyprus)
