= Koilani =

Koilani Κοιλάνι
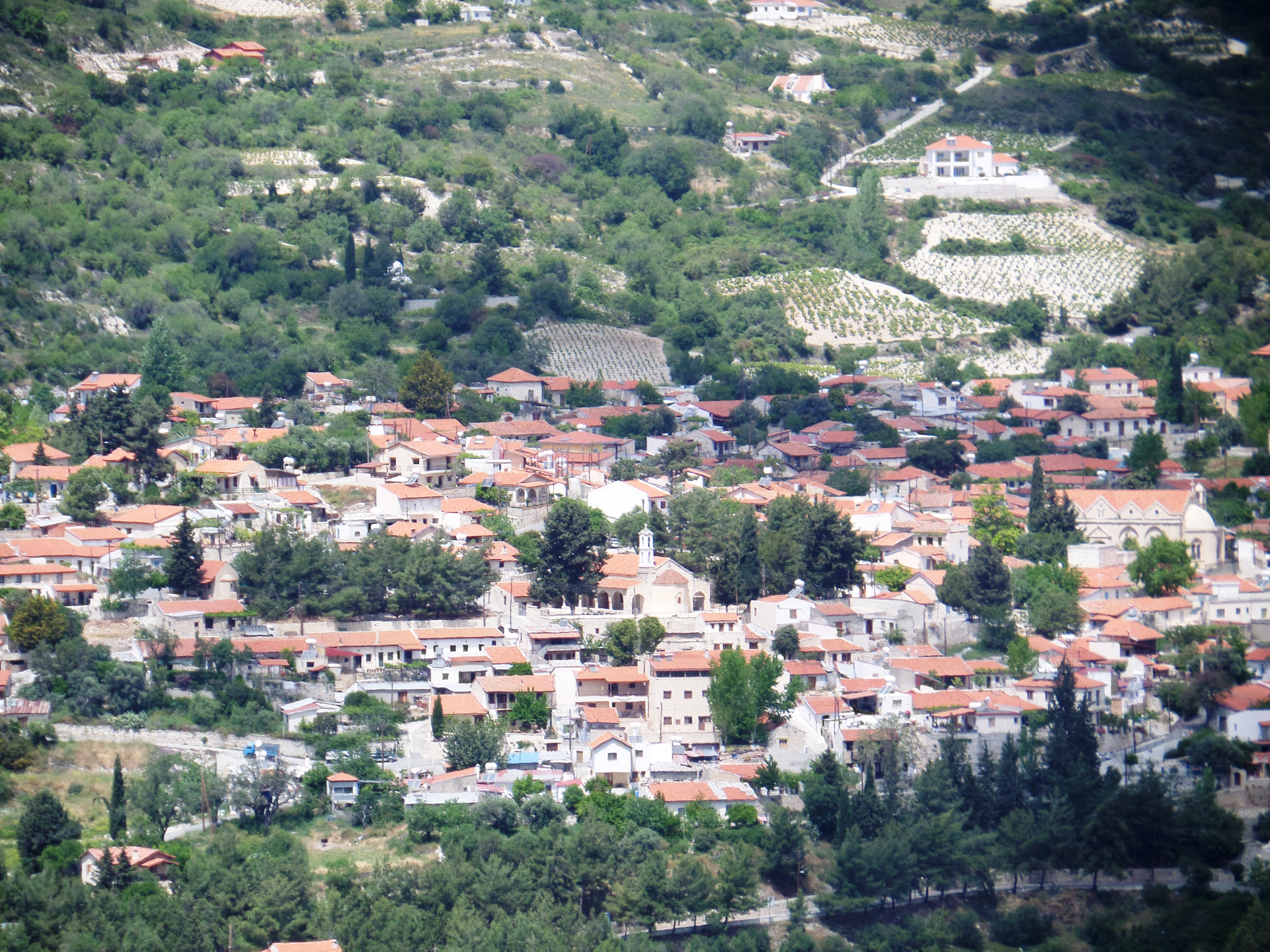

- Location in Cyprus
- Coordinates: 34°50′41″N 32°51′37″E
- Country: Cyprus
- District: Limassol District

Government
  - President of Community Council: Kyriakos Chatzicharalambous
- Elevation: 2,690 ft (820 m)

Population (2001)
  - Total: 280
- Time zone: UTC+2 (EET)
  - Summer (DST): UTC+3 (EEST)
- Postal Code: 4776
- Website: Official Koilani Village Website

Koilani (Greek: Κοιλάνι) is a village in the Limassol District of Cyprus, located 3 kilometres (1.9 mi) south of Pera Pedi.

== Geography ==
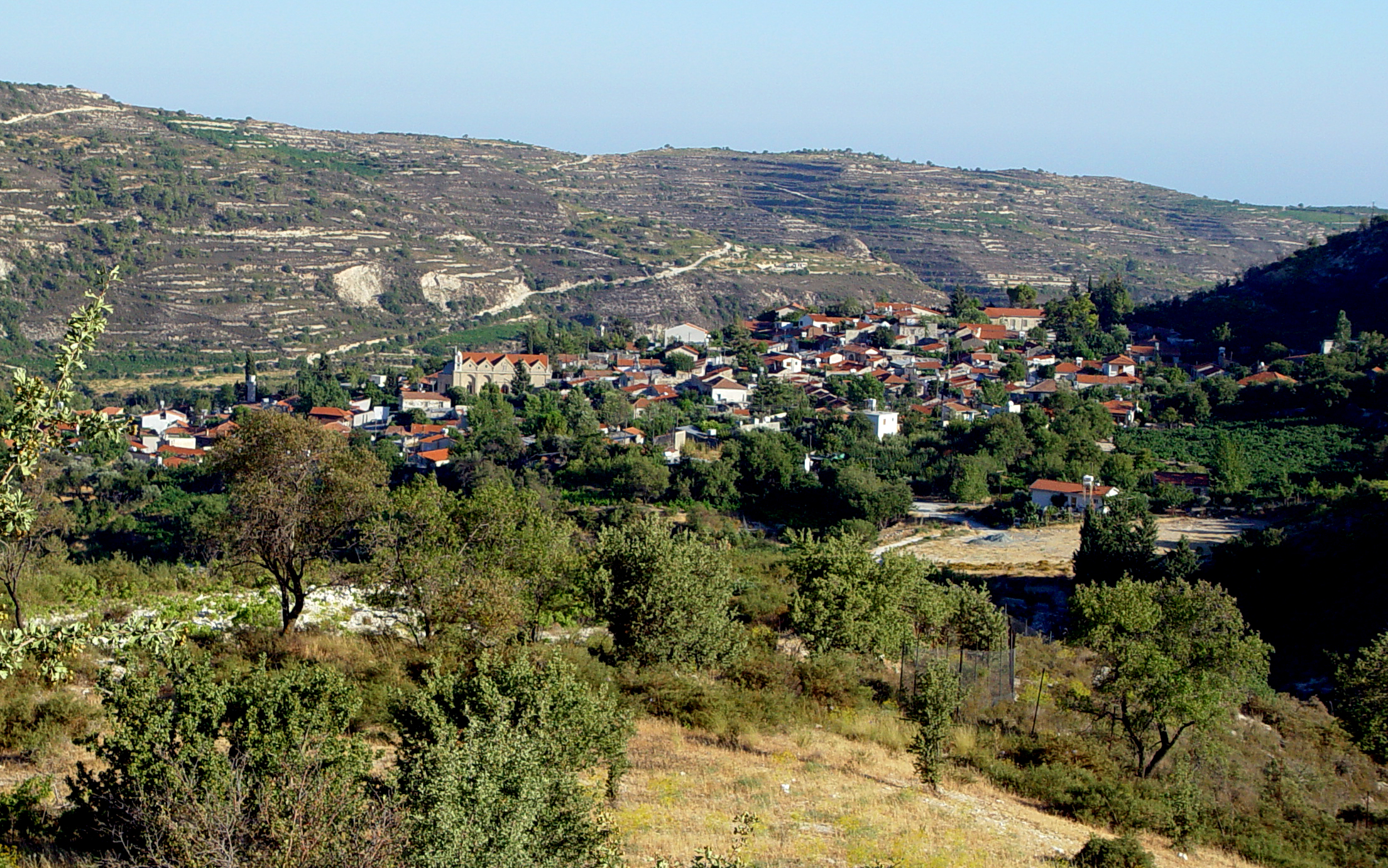
Koilani

The village of Koilani is built close to the west bank of the river Kryos (Cold River), a tributary of the Kouris River, at an altitude of 820 meters. Tall mountaintops are visible from the village. It is 36 kilometres from Limassol (north-westerly). The village is connected through a motorway to Pera Pedi in the east, to Vouni in the south-east, to Mandria in the north, and to Silikou in the south-east. Koilani has preserved the traditional folk architecture of the wine-producing villages of the Limassol district. Narrow, paved, ascending alleys, tiled roofs, yard walls with earthenware jars, balconies, and arches with embossed frames at the entrances of houses that are built with regional, carved limestone, provide the visitor a taste of the tradition and inheritance of the village

== Etymology ==
For the naming of the village, there are several interpretations:

1. . According to one version, up to the Byzantine years it was named Kourion or Korineon and after the Frank Domination era it took its name from a French region of the same name.
2. . Another version assumes that it originated from the ancient city of Kyllene of Pelloponesos (Greece) from where the first inhabitants of the village came. However, this does not seem very probable if it is accepted that the village was named Kourion or Korineon during ancient times.
3. . A third version contemplates that the village took its name due to standing in a valley. In reality, however, the village is built upon a steep slope of the Arames Mountain.

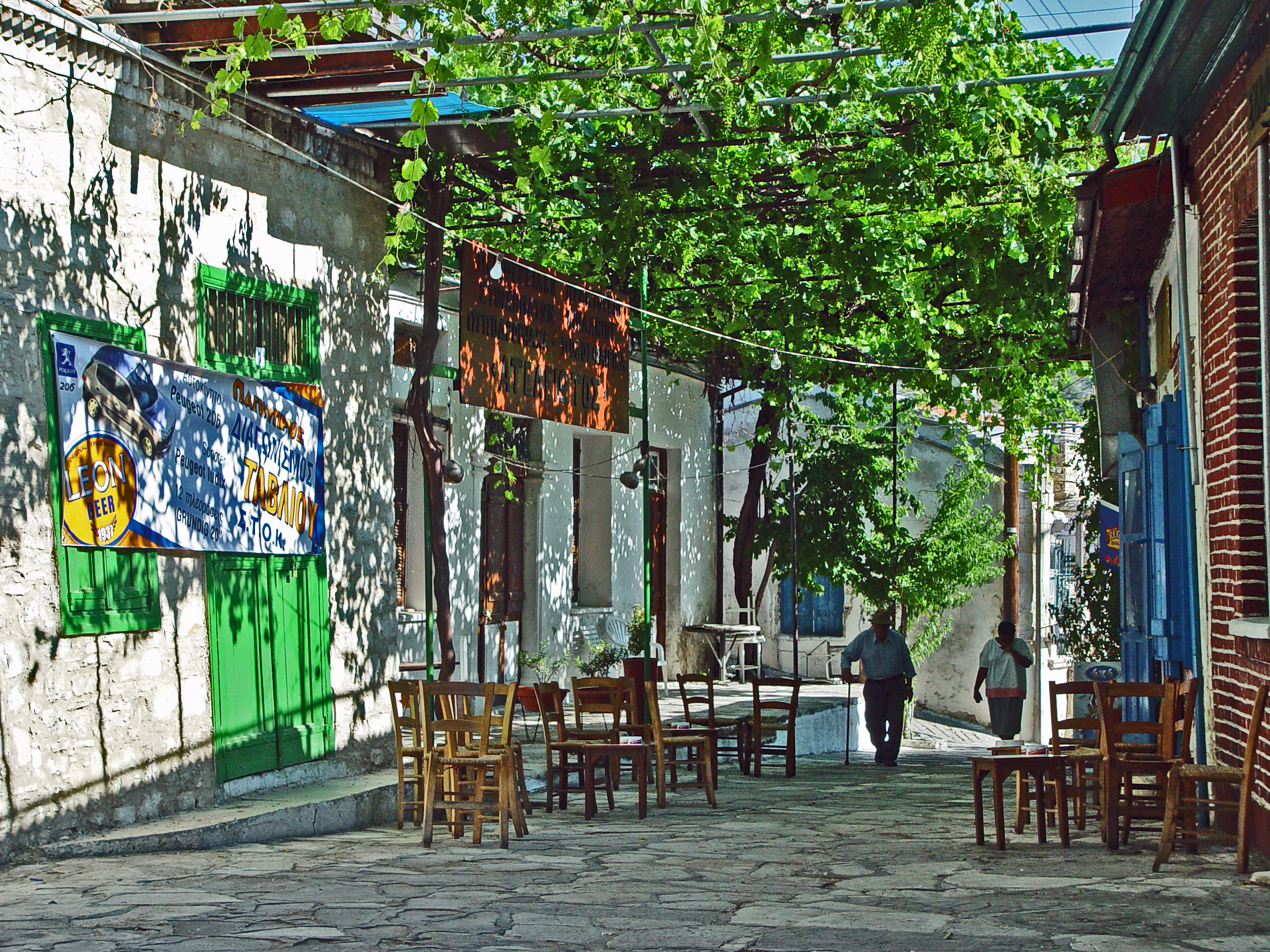
Alley with grapevines pergola in centre of Koilani

== Climate ==
Koilani receives an average annual rainfall of about 750 millimetres; mainly vines of wine-making varieties, and apple, pear, almond, olive, and citrus trees are cultivated in its region.

== Population ==
The village, like all the wine-producing villages of the region, has gone through great fluctuations of the population. In 1881, the inhabitants of the village numbered 995, increasing to 1,119 in 1891, and to 1,301 in 1911. In 1921, the inhabitants were reduced to 1,279, increasing again to 1,397 in 1946. Among the inhabitants of the community there were 85 Turkish-Cypriots. In 1960, the population decreased to 1304 (999 Greek-Cypriots and 35 Turkish-Cypriots). The decrease of population continued in 1973 when the inhabitants were 874 (839 Greek-Cypriots and 35 Turkish-Cypriots). After the 1974 Turkish invasion, the Turkish-Cypriot inhabitants of the village were coerced by their leadership to abandon the village and -along with other Turkish-Cypriots from other villages to transfer for relocation in the island's occupied territories. So, in 1976 the village's inhabitants decreased to 827, all Greek-Cypriots, and to 614 in 1982. Today, the village's inhabitants number 280.

== Notable people ==
- Archimandrite Kyprianos, 18th century Greek Cypriot intellectual and cleric
