= Annales de Terre Sainte =

13th-century annals of the crusader states

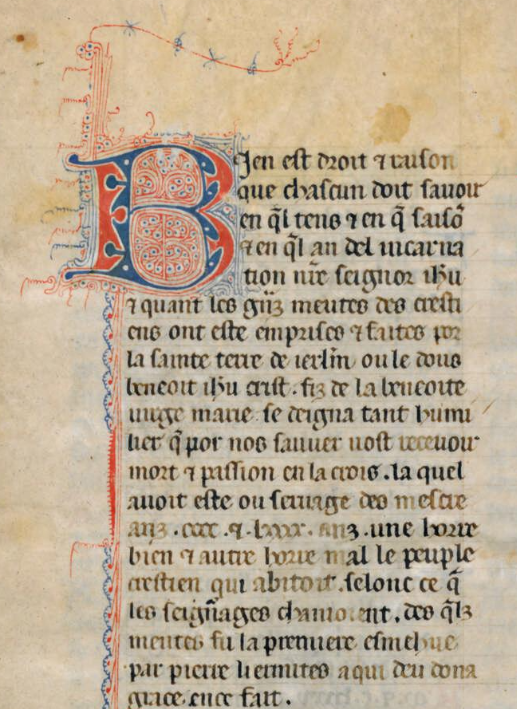
Prologue from the Florence manuscript. It begins Bien est droit et raison que chascun doit savoir en quel tens et en que saison et en quel an de l'incarnation Nostre Seignor Jhesu...

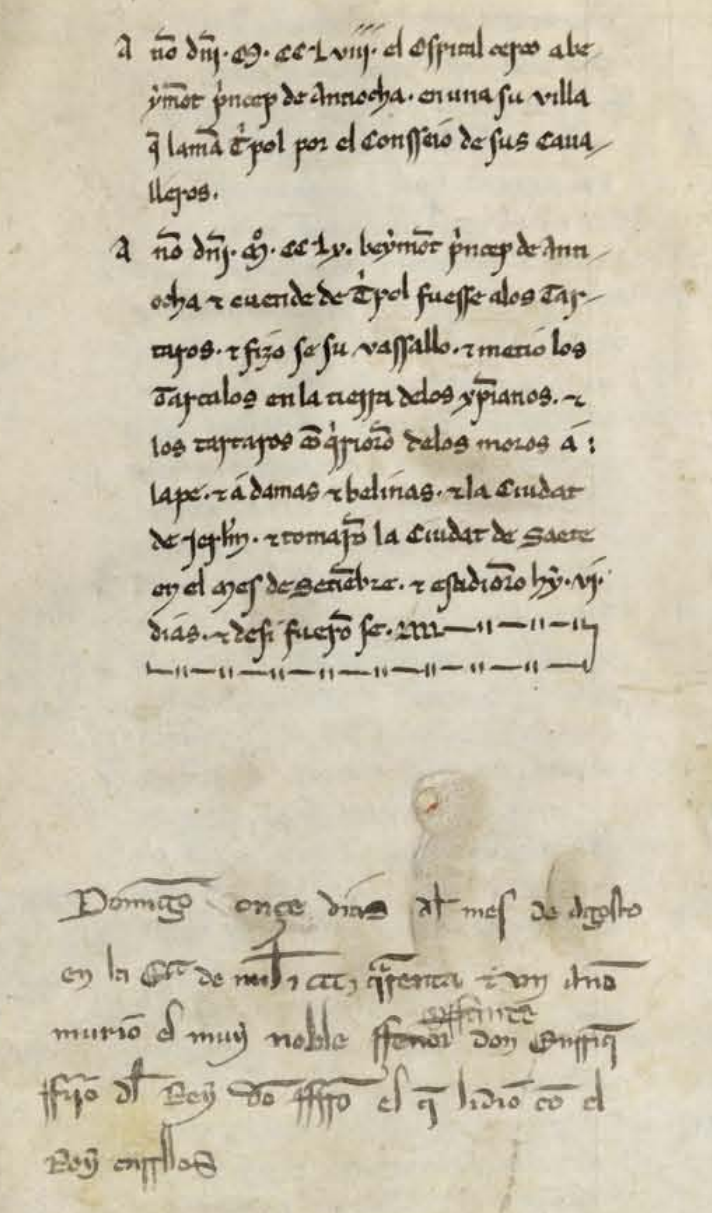
Annals for 1258 and 1260 from the Spanish translation, with the added notice for 1303

The Annales de Terre Sainte ("Annals of the Holy Land") is a series of brief annals of the Crusades and the Crusader states from the council of Clermont in 1095 until the fall of Acre in 1291. It is untitled in the manuscripts. Its modern title was coined by its 19th-century editors. The original is in Old French, but an Old Spanish translation is also known. For the thirteenth-century Crusades, it is a valuable and independent historical source.

The Old French text survives in at least three manuscript copies, each presenting a different redaction. The earliest—now in Florence, Biblioteca Medicea-Laurenziana, Pluteus LXI.10, folios 1r–8r—was made in late 1290 or early 1291, before the fall of Acre. It is thus an early redaction that does not extend down as far as the others. Its account ends in 1277. The two fuller texts are both now in Paris, Bibliothèque Nationale de France. One, Fr. 24941 (at folios 48–49), is on paper and dates to the 13th century. It goes down to 1291. The other, Fr. 6447 (at folios 369–375), is on parchment and dates to the 15th century. It stops in 1289. It also presents a much more detailed version, but for the period 1270–1289 the two versions diverge substantially. The Florence version contains some unique information not found in the other versions. For example, it alone records how the church of Saint Nicholas outside the walls at Antioch was destroyed when the crusaders prepared to defend the city against a Mongol invasion in 1260.

The surviving Spanish translation ends in 1260. It is closest to the text of Paris Fr. 6447, but in some cases condensing the latter's account and in other places augmenting it with details not found elsewhere. It diverges completely for the years 1257–1260. Both versions may be derived from a lost draft that ended in 1257. The only copy of the Spanish redaction—now in Madrid, Biblioteca Nacional de España, 10046—was made between 1260 and 1303 in Gothic cursive. A note in a different hand was added after the end of the annals noting the death of Henry the Senator in the latter year.

Material from the Annales was incorporated into the Old French Gestes des Chiprois, the Italian Chronicle of Amadi and the Latin Liber secretorum fidelium crucis. The continuation of the Estoire de Eracles, an Old French translation of William of Tyre's Historia, makes use of it for the 1240s onwards.

== Manuscripts ==
- Florence, Biblioteca Medicea-Laurenziana, Pluteus LXI.10, ff. 1r–8r
- Paris, Bibliothèque Nationale de France, Fr. 24941, ff. 48–49
- Paris, Bibliothèque Nationale de France, Fr. 6447, ff. 369–375
- Madrid, Biblioteca Nacional de España, 10046

== Bibliography ==
- Edbury, Peter W. (2007). "A New Text of the Annales de Terre Sainte". In Iris Shagrir; Ronnie Ellenblum; Jonathan Riley-Smith (eds.). In Laudem Hierosolymitani: Studies in Crusades and Medieval Culture in Honour of Benjamin Z. Kedar. Ashgate. pp. 145–161.
- Röhricht, Reinhold; Raynaud, Gaston, eds. (1884). "Annales de Terre Sainte, 1095–1291". Archives de l'Orient Latin. 2: 427–461.
- Sánchez Candeira, Alfonso (1960). "Las Cruzadas en la historiografía española de la época: Traducción castellana de una redacción desconocida de los 'Anales de Tierra Santa'". Hispania. 20 (80): 325–367. ProQuest 1300490075
