= Leontios Machairas =

Cypriot historian

Leontios Machairas or Makhairas (Greek: Λεόντιος Μαχαιράς, French: Léonce Machéras; c. 1380 – after 1432) was a historian in medieval Cyprus.

The main source of information on him is his chronicle, written in the medieval Cypriot dialect of Greek, titled Ἐξήγησις τῆς γλυκείας χώρας Κύπρου ἡ ποία λέγεται Κρόνακα, τοὐτέστιν Χρονικόν (Chronicle of the sweet land of Cyprus). The chronicle documents events from the visit of Helena of Constantinople to Cyprus until the times of the Kingdom of Cyprus. Machairas was Orthodox Christian but wrote with respect for the pope and the Catholic ruling class of Cyprus for whom he was working. At the same time he showed his hatred towards the Venetians and the Genoese. He is the only source on the "Re Alexis" rebellion of Cypriot serfs, which he condemned. Following the usual Byzantine practice, he only used the word "basileus" (Greek for sovereign) for the Byzantine emperor, and referred to the king of Cyprus as "regas" (from Latin rex king). Machairas was also present at the Battle of Choirokoitia. The text as we have it became abbreviated after 1432, and historians believe the remainder of the text is a subsequent accretion.

There are manuscripts of the chronicle at the Bodleian Library in Oxford, the Biblioteca Marciana in Venice, and Ravenna. The Oxford manuscript was copied in Paphos in June 1555, according to an additional paragraph after the end of the chronicle. The chronicle was published by Constantine Sathas as part of his Medieval Library in Venice in 1873. The chronicles of Cyprus by Amadi and Diomede Strambaldi published by Rene de Mas Latrie in Paris in 1891 were translations of Machairas's chronicle into Italian.

The chronicle was published again by Richard M. Dawkins with an English translation as "Recital Concerning the Sweet Land of Cyprus Entitled 'Chronicle' - The chronicle of Makhairas" in Oxford in 1932. The Ravenna manuscript has not yet been incorporated into a critical edition.

== Manuscripts ==
Three manuscripts of the Chronicle survive:

- Venice: Biblioteca Marciana. Gr. VII, 16, 1080
- Oxford: Bodleian Library. Selden, Supra 14 (dated 1555)
- Ravenna: Biblioteca Classense, cod. gr. 187, fol. 1-184 (late 16th century)

== Publication history ==
- Σάθας, K. (1873). Μεσαιωνική Βιβλιοθήκη Τόμος Β΄. Χρονογράφοι Βασιλείου Κύπρου. Εν Βενετία: Τύποις του Χρόνου.
- Miller. E & Sathas. K. (1881). Λεοντίου Μαχαιρά Χρονικόν Κύπρου. Chronique de Chypre. Publications de l’Ecole des langues orientales vivantes. Paris.
- Miller. E & Sathas. K. (1882). Chronique de Chypre par Léonce Machéras. Paris: Ernest Leroux.
- Dawkins, R. M. (1932). Recital Concerning the Sweet Land of Cyprus Entitled 'Chronicle' - The chronicle of Makhairas. Oxford.
- Παυλίδης, Α. (1982). Λεοντίου Μαχαιρά Χρονικόν. Λευκωσία: Φιλόκυπρος. 2nd ed. 1995, 3rd ed. 2010.
- Πιερής, M. & Νικολάου-Κονναρή, A. (2003). Χρονικό της Κύπρου: Παράλληλη Διπλωματική Έκδοση των Χειρογράφων. Λευκωσία: Κέντρο Επιστημονικών Ερευνών.

== See also ==
- Florio Bustron
- Georgios Boustronios
- Kingdom of Cyprus
- Neophytos of Cyprus
- Stephen of Lusignan
