= Georgios Boustronios =

Cypriot chronicler (15th century)

Georgios Boustronios (Greek: Τζώρτζης Μπουστρούς, hellenised as Γεώργιος Βουστρώνιος; c. 1435/1440 – after 1501) was a 15th century Cypriot royal official and chronicler possibly of Syrian origin. His chronicle Διήγησις Kρόνικας Kύπρου (Diegesis Kronikas Kyprou, Narrative of the Chronicle of Cyprus) was written in prose in Cypriot Greek. He was a close friend and serviceman of James II, King of Cyprus. His chronicle documents events contemporary to his life, especially the transition from Lusignan to Venetian rule in Cyprus. His narrative starts where the chronicle of Leontios Machairas ends, at 1456, and concludes at 1489, the year when Catherine Cornaro, the last queen of Cyprus, ceded the island to the Republic of Venice. He documented the civil war between Queen Charlotte and her half brother James II, between 1440 and 1444, and the interventions by Hospitallers and Mamluks in the politics of the island. He was a relative of Florio Bustron, a notary and the author of another chronicle on Cypriot history; Chronique de l'île de Chypre, which begins with antiquity and also ends in 1489.

The chronicle survives in three manuscripts; two are in the Biblioteca Marciana in Venice and the other one is part of the Arundel Manuscripts in the British Library, with the Arundel Manuscript considered to be the oldest. The chronicle was first published, based on the two Marcian manuscripts, by Konstantinos Sathas as part of his Medieval Library II (pages 413–543) in Venice in 1873. The chronicle was published again, this time based on all three manuscripts, by Richard M. Dawkins with an English translation as The Chronicle of George Boustronios, 1456-1489 in Melbourne in 1964. In 1997 Giorgos Kechagioglou published another critical edition in the original Greek, titled Τζώρτζης (Μ)πουστρούς (Γεώργιος Βο(σ)τρ(υ)ηνός ή Βουστρώνιος, Διήγησις Κρόνικας Κύπρου. A more recent publication and English translation was done by Nicholas Coureas in 2006, titled A Narrative of the Chronicle of Cyprus, 1456–1489.

== Manuscripts ==
- Venice: Biblioteca Marciana
- London: British Library, Arundel Manuscripts, Arundel MS 518 (16th century)

== Publications ==
- Διήγησις Kρονίκας Kύπρου Publication by Konstantinos Sathas in his Medieval Library II, Vienna, 1873.
- Dawkins, R. M. The Chronicle of George Boustronios 1456 - 1489, Public. No 2, Univ. of Melbourne Cyprus Expedition, 1964.
- Coureas, N. A Narrative of the Chronicle of Cyprus, 1456–1489, 2006.

== See also ==
- Chronicle of Amadi
- Kingdom of Cyprus
- Neophytos of Cyprus
- Stephen of Lusignan
