= Florio Bustron =

16th century administrator, jurist and historian

Florio Bustron (Greek: Φλώριος Βουστρώνιος) (1500s - post-1568, perhaps 9 September 1570), was a 16th century administrator, jurist and historian. Florio became a prominent administrative figure when Cyprus was under Venetian rule. He came from the well known Cypriot Bustron family, possibly of Syrian origin, with Greek and Latinised members. According to John Sozomenos who described the siege of Nicosia by the Ottomans in 1570, he died during the Turkish invasion.

His work Historia overo commentarii de Cipro was written in Italian prose. A part of his chronicle concerns the final years of the Kingdom of Cyprus with the internal crisis between Queen Charlotte and James the Bastard. He was related to another Cypriot chronicler, Georgios Boustronios, Florio based part of his narrative to the earlier chronicle by Georgios, their chronicles both end in 1489. Florio Bustron also makes one of the earliest references to Halloumi (in Italian, ‘calumi’) made from a mixture of sheep’s and goat’s milk.

The chronicle was later published by René de Mas Latrie, son of the French historian Luis de Mas Latrie and it was reprinted in 1998 in Nicosia. In 1998 it was published in Greek translation.

== Publications ==
- Chronique de l'Île de Chypre. Par Florio Bustron. Publiée par M. René de Mas Latrie. 1884
- Α. Παυλίδης και Άννα Ερκολάνι, Ιστορία της Κύπρου του Φλωρίου Βουστρωνίου, Φιλόκυπρος, Λευκωσία, 1998.
- Bustron, Florio. Historia overo commentarii de Cipro. Nicosia: Bank of Cyprus Cultural Foundation, 1998.

== Publications about Bustron ==
- Χάρκας, Ιωάννης Ζ. (2020). Η ιστορία της Κύπρου του Φλωρίου Βουστρωνίου: πηγές και επιδράσεις της ουμανιστικής ιστοριογραφίας. Διδακτορική διατριβή. Λευκωσία: Πανεπιστήμιο Κύπρου, Φιλοσοφική Σχολή.

== See also ==
- Venetian Cyprus
- Leontios Machairas
- Georgios Boustronios
- Chronicle of ‘Amadi’
- Stefano Lusignan
