= Stephen of Lusignan =

Stephen of Lusignan (French: Étienne de Lusignan, Italian: Steffano Lusignano; 1537–1590) was a priest, scholar, and titular bishop of Venetian Cyprus who migrated to Italy and France.

== Life ==
Stephen was born in Nicosia, in Venetian Cyprus, a descendant of the royal House of Lusignan. His father was Jason and his uncle Phoebus, both served in the position of capitano of Limassol.

When he was young, Stephen joined the Dominican Order and studied under an Armenian bishop named Ioulianos. By 1562 he was a priest and worked under two Latin bishops of Limassol, Andrea Mocenigo and Serafim Fortibraccia. By 1570, he was living in a monastery in Naples, in the Kingdom of Naples, where he began writing his best-known work, Chorograffia. In 1571, Cyprus fell to the Ottoman Empire, and after that, Stephen spent much of his time collecting ransom money to buy the freedom of relations who had been captured. In 1572, he moved to a monastery at Bologna, a university city in the Papal States. There, he first published his work named Chorograffia.

In 1575 he moved to Padua, under the control of the Republic of Venice, and there he designed a famous map to supplement his book, dedicating it to the last Latin Archbishop of Cyprus, Filippo Mocenigo. The map was engraved by Giovanni Longo and paid for by Stephen himself. His Chorograffia and his Description de toute l'isle de Cypre include many classical sources such as Strabo, Pliny, Virgil, Ovid, Pausanias, Plutarch, Diogenes Laertius and reference various ancient cities like Salamis, Kourion and Amathus and important mythological figures of Cyprus such as Cinyras, Aphrodite and Adonis.

In the course of his stay in Padua, Stephen also taught Greek at the University of Padua. During a trip to Rome, he met the French ambassador and with his help moved to Paris in 1577. He lived in a monastery in Paris for ten years. Throughout his stay there he wrote and published many works. He was also involved in literary circles with other Cypriots, including Enrico Caterino Davila. In 1578 Pope Sixtus V appointed Stephen as titular bishop of Limassol. He spent the last years of his life in Rome, where he died in 1590.

== Publications ==
- Lusignan, S. (1573). Chorograffia: et breve historia universale dell'Isola de Cipro principiando al tempo di Noè per in sino al 1572. Bologna: Alessandro Benaccio.
- Lusignan, S. (1579). Histoire Contenant une Sommaire Description des Genealogies, Alliances, & gestes de tous les Princes & grans Seigneurs... Royames Hierusalem, Cypre, Armenie, & lieux circonvoisins. Paris: Chez Guillaume Chaudiere.
- Lusignan, S. (1580). Description de Toute l'Isle de Cypre, et des Roys, Princes, et Seigneurs, tant Payens que Chrestiens, qui ont commandé en icelle. Paris: Chez Guillaume Chaudiere.

== Digitised manuscripts of the Chorograffia ==
- Getty Research Institute has two copies
- The John Adams Library at the Boston Public Library
- Sylvia Ioannou Foundation

== See also ==
- Leontios Machairas
- Georgios Boustronios
- Florio Bustron
- Venetian Cyprus
