= 1219 =

1219 in various calendars
- Gregorian calendar: 1219; MCCXIX
- Ab urbe condita: 1972
- Armenian calendar: 668; ԹՎ ՈԿԸ
- Assyrian calendar: 5969
- Balinese saka calendar: 1140–1141
- Bengali calendar: 625–626
- Berber calendar: 2169
- English Regnal year: 3 Hen. 3 – 4 Hen. 3
- Buddhist calendar: 1763
- Burmese calendar: 581
- Byzantine calendar: 6727–6728
- Chinese calendar: 戊寅年 (Earth Tiger); 3916 or 3709 — to — 己卯年 (Earth Rabbit); 3917 or 3710
- Coptic calendar: 935–936
- Discordian calendar: 2385
- Ethiopian calendar: 1211–1212
- Hebrew calendar: 4979–4980
- Hindu calendars
- Vikram Samvat: 1275–1276
- Shaka Samvat: 1140–1141
- Kali Yuga: 4319–4320
- Holocene calendar: 11219
- Igbo calendar: 219–220
- Iranian calendar: 597–598
- Islamic calendar: 615–616
- Japanese calendar: Kenpō 7 / Jōkyū 1 (承久元年)
- Javanese calendar: 1127–1128
- Julian calendar: 1219; MCCXIX
- Korean calendar: 3552
- Minguo calendar: 693 before ROC 民前693年
- Nanakshahi calendar: −249
- Thai solar calendar: 1761–1762
- Tibetan calendar: ས་ཕོ་སྟག་ལོ་ (male Earth-Tiger); 1345 or 964 or 192 — to — ས་མོ་ཡོས་ལོ་ (female Earth-Hare); 1346 or 965 or 193

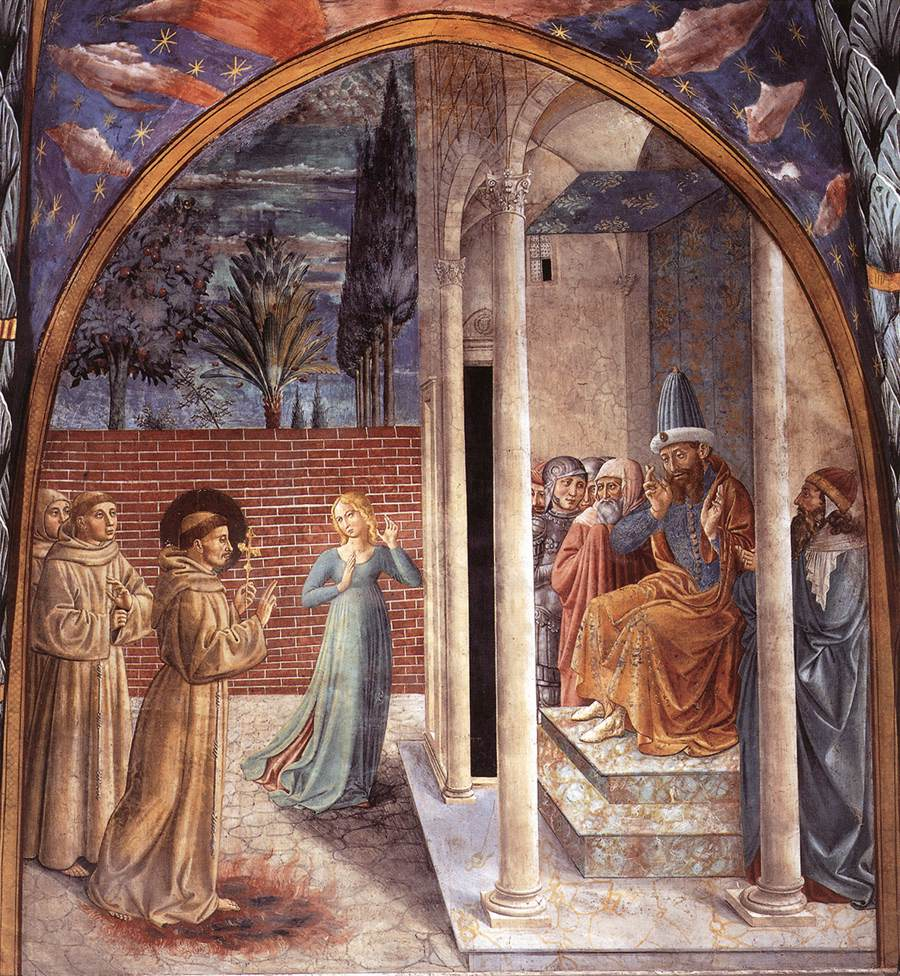
Francis of Assisi and Illuminatus of Arce meet Sultan Al-Kamil. By Benozzo Gozzoli (15th century).

Year 1219 (MCCXIX) was a common year starting on Tuesday of the Julian calendar.

== Events ==
=== By place ===
==== Fifth Crusade ====
- February – Pelagius orders the Crusader army to prepare an attack against the Egyptians but is unsuccessful because of the weather and strength of the defenders. Sultan Al-Kamil, in command of the Egyptian forces, is almost overthrown by a conspiracy in his entourage. He considers fleeing to the Ayyubid Emirate of Yemen, ruled by his son Al-Mas'ud Yusuf, but the arrival of his brother Al-Mu'azzam, with reinforcements from Syria, ends the conspiracy. On hearing the news that Al-Kamil and his army is retreating to Cairo, the Crusaders march to Al-Adiliya. After driving back an assault from the garrison of Damietta they occupy the town on February 5.
- April – The Crusaders surround Damietta, with the Italian forces to the north, Knights Templar and Knights Hospitaller to the east – and King John I of Jerusalem with his French and Pisan troops to the south. The Frisians and German troops occupy the old camp across the Nile. A new wave of Crusader reinforcements from Cyprus arrive led by Walter III of Caesarea. Meanwhile, Al-Mu'azzam decides to dismantle the fortifications at Mount Tabor and other defensive positions, as well as Jerusalem itself, in order to deny their protection should the Crusaders prevail there. Some fanatics wish to destroy the Holy Sepulchre, but this is refused by Al-Mu'azzam.
- April 7 – Al-Muzaffar II, Ayyubid ruler of Hama, arrives Egypt with Syrian reinforcements, leading multiple attacks on the Crusader camp at Al-Adiliya, with little impact. In the meantime, new Crusader forces bring badly needed supplies. Egyptian attacks continue through May, with Crusader counter-attacks utilizing a Lombard device known as a carroccio, confounding the defenders.
- July 8 – Pelagius begins multiple attacks at Damietta, using Pisan and Venetian troops. Each time they are repelled by the defenders, using Greek fire. A counter-offensive led by Al-Kamil on the Templar camp is repulsed on July 31 by their new Grand Master Peire de Montagut, supported by the Teutonic Knights – where the Crusaders reform and pursue the enemy outside the gates.
- August 29 – The Crusaders attack the Egyptian camp in the Battle of Faraskur and the Muslims pretend a feigned retreat to Mansoura. John I advises to camp overnight, because there is no fresh water in the region between the Nile and Lake Manzalah. Al-Kamil decides to halt the retreat and turns his forces to deliver a smashing attack upon the disorganized Crusaders, losing some 4,300 men.
- September – Francis of Assisi, an Italian preacher, arrives in the Crusader camp and introduces Catholicism in Egypt. He seeks permission from Pelagius to visit Al-Kamil. After an initial refusal, he sends Francis under a flag of truce to Faraskur. Al-Kamil receives him courteously and offers him many gifts. He accepts a death-bed baptism, and is escorted back to the Crusader camp.
- October – Al-Kamil sends two captive knights as envoys, to renew his former offers of an armistice. If the Crusaders evacuate Egypt, he will return the True Cross (lost in the Battle of Hattin) and they can have Jerusalem, all central Palestine and Galilee. John I advised its acceptance, along with the nobles from England, France and Germany. Pelagius again refuses the peace terms.
- November 5 – Siege of Damietta: The Crusaders enter Damietta and find it abandoned. Seeing the Crusader standards flying from the towers, Al-Kamil hastily abandons his camp at Faraskur and withdraws to Mansoura. Survivors in the city are either sent into slavery or held as hostages to trade for Christian prisoners. On November 23, the Crusader army captures the city of Tinnis.

==== Mongol Empire ====
- Winter – Genghis Khan sends a Mongol army (some 20,000 men) under his eldest son Jochi and Jebe to cross the Tian Shan mountains ("Heavenly Mountains") to ravage the fertile Fergana Valley, in the eastern part of the Khwarezm Empire. The Mongols suffer many losses but slip through the defensive lines and confuse the enemy who thinks this is Genghis' main force. Muhammad II dispatches his elite cavalry reserve to protect the fertile regions with force. Meanwhile, another Mongol army under his second and third sons Chagatai and Ögedei passes through the Dzungarian Gate, and immediately start laying siege to the border city of Otrar.
- Mongol forces under Chagatai and Ögedei capture Otrar after a 5-month siege. The city becomes the first of many settlements to have its entire population slain or enslaved before it is razed to the ground. Inalchuq, the Khwarezmian governor of Otrar, is captured and executed by pouring molten silver into his eyes and ears – an unlikely and unnecessarily expensive end.
- By letter, Genghis Khan summons Qiu Chuji (Master Changchun) to visit him, to advise him on the medicine of immortality (the Philosopher's Stone).

==== Europe ====
- June 15 – Livonian Crusade: Danish Crusaders led by King Valdemar II (the Victorious), conquer Tallinn in the Battle of Lyndanisse. What is to become the flag of Denmark (Dannebrog) allegedly falls from the sky during that battle. Their stronghold in Tallinn will help the Danes conquer the entirety of Danish Estonia.
- Twenty-four Lithuanian dukes and nobles purportedly sign a peace treaty with Halych-Volhynia, stating a common cause against invading Christian Crusaders.

==== Asia ====
- May 2 – King Leo II (or Levon) of Armenian Cilicia dies, leaving only two daughters. The elder, Stephanie, is the wife of John I; the younger, Isabella, daughter of Princess Sibylla of Cyprus and Jerusalem, is three years old. Leo has promised the succession to his nephew, Raymond-Roupen of Antioch, but on his death-bed he names Isabella as his heir.

=== By topic ===
==== Technology ====
- The windmill is first introduced to China, with the travels of Yelü Chucai to Transoxiana.
- Mina'i ware pottery production in Persia ceases as a result of the Mongol conquests.

== Births ==
- February 18 – Tettsū Gikai, Japanese Zen master (d. 1309)
- April 5 – Wonjong of Goryeo, Korean ruler (d. 1274)
- Abu al-Abbas al-Mursi, Moorish Sufi leader (d. 1287)
- Ariq Böke (or Buka), Mongol ruler (khagan) (d. 1266)
- Baldwin of Avesnes, French nobleman (d. 1295)
- Christopher I (or Christoffer), king of Denmark (d. 1259)
- Umiliana de' Cerchi, Italian noblewoman (d. 1246)
- William Devereux, English nobleman (d. 1265)

== Deaths ==
- February 6 – Robert of Courçon, English cardinal (b. 1160)
- February 13 – Minamoto no Sanetomo, Japanese shogun (b. 1192)
- March 17 – Rudolph I, Count Palatine of Tübingen (b. 1160)
- March 22 – Henryk Kietlicz, archbishop of Gniezno (b. 1150)
- April 30 – Aldebrandus, bishop of Fossombrone (b. 1119)
- May 1 – Raoul I of Lusignan, French nobleman and knight
- May 2 – Leo II (or Levon), king of Armenian Cilicia (b. 1150)
- May 14 – William Marshal, 1st Earl of Pembroke (b. 1146)
- June 15 – Theoderich von Treyden, German missionary
- June 17 – David of Scotland, Scottish nobleman (b 1152)
- October 29 – Ch'oe Ch'ung-hŏn, Korean ruler (b. 1149)
- November 3 – Saer de Quincy, English nobleman (b. 1170)
- November 5 – Hugh IX (the Brown), French nobleman
- December 17 – Conon de Béthune, French knight (b. 1150)
- Casimir II (or Kasimir), duke of Pomerania-Demmin (b. 1180)
- Gerard de Furnival, Norman nobleman and knight (b. 1175)
- Henry de Grey, English nobleman and courtier (b. 1155)
- Inalchuq (or Inalchuk), Khwarezmian governor of Otrar
- John of Béthune, French nobleman and bishop (b. 1160)
- John de Courcy, English nobleman and knight (b. 1150)
- Peter II of Courtenay, Latin emperor of Constantinople
- Richalmus, German Cistercian abbot and biographer
- Scholastique of Champagne, French noblewoman (b. 1172)
- Walter III of Châtillon, French nobleman and knight
- William de Valognes, Scoto-Norman Lord Chamberlain
- Yolanda of Flanders, Latin empress and regent (b. 1175)
