= Clarembald of Broies =

13th-century Catholic bishop

Clarembald of Broies (French: Clarembaud) was a Latin churchman who served as the archbishop of Tyre in the Kingdom of Jerusalem from 1202 to 1215.

Clarembald hailed from Broyes in the French County of Champagne. He witnessed acts of Count Henry the Liberal in the 1170s, and was the master of the school of Saint-Étienne in Troyes.

Clarembald was consecrated in 1202 without the permission of the papal legate, Cardinal Soffred. The Latin patriarch of Jerusalem, Aymar the Monk, died the same year. The canons of the Holy Sepulchre were unable to agree on who should succeed Aymar and delegated the choice to Clarembald, whom they probably considered impartial because he had only recently arrived from France. Clarembald suggested the archbishop of Caesarea, Peter of Limoges. Pope Innocent III refused to ratify this choice and Soffred quashed the election. Soffred was then himself elected. Clarembald and Soffred thus began their episcopates with a quarrel. The pope sent pallia to both men via Cardinal Peter Capuano, who traveled to Palestine in 1203.

Clarembald was the second-highest-ranking bishop in the kingdom, after the patriarch, and Innocent was keen to support him. When, in 1204, the Fourth Crusade was diverted to the Byzantine Empire, many of the Latin churchmen from Syria were drawn to its spoils. Clarembald left his see and traveled to Constantinople, leaving the bishop of Halberstadt, Conrad of Krosigk, as his vicar. Soffred resigned the patriarchate at this time, and Innocent appointed Albert of Vercelli in his stead.

On 5 December 1207, Clarembald drew up a contract for King Hugh I of Cyprus and his stepsister Alice of Champagne. Clarembald decreed that if Alice died before the marriage could take place, Hugh could instead marry her younger sister, Philippa. However, the most important marriage in the Kingdom of Jerusalem was that of its heir, Alice's half-sister Maria of Montferrat. Eventually, a Champenois knight, John of Brienne, was selected to be Maria's husband and king of Jerusalem. It is possible that John was championed by Clarembald and the other Champenois potentates—the chancellor, Ralph of Merencourt; the constable, Walter of Montbéliard; and the lord of Caesarea, Aymar of Lairon. Clarembald may even have been related to John.

No archbishop of Tyre attended the Fourth Council of the Lateran in 1215, which suggests that the see was vacant. By 1217, the see was occupied by Simon of Maugastel.
