= Simon of Maugastel =

13th-century archbishop of Tyre and patriarch of Constantinople

Simon of Maugastel was a Latin churchman who was the archbishop of Tyre from c. 1216 until c. 1229 and henceforth patriarch of Constantinople until his death in 1233. He also briefly served as chancellor of the Kingdom of Jerusalem in the 1220s.

== Background ==
Simon was born into a family from Perche settled in Syria. He had a brother, Philip. His uncle Joscius was the archbishop of Tyre and chancellor of the Kingdom of Jerusalem, which may have helped him rise through the ecclesiastical ranks.

== Archiepiscopacy ==
Simon was appointed to the see of Tyre by 1217, probably before 1216; his predecessor, Clarembald of Broies, was presumably still in office in 1214. His promotion to the archbishopric may have been arranged by King John, who was close to the Maugastel family. From 1216 to 1217, Simon was in northern France, preaching the Fifth Crusade. In December 1216, Pope Honorius III made him papal legate.

As archbishop of Tyre, Simon was the senior metropolitan in the kingdom. Because the archbishop of Tyre was relatively poor in the 13th century, Simon was granted the prebends in the churches of Antioch and Tripoli in 1218. For many years, he was in a dispute with the Venetian colony in Tyre, who refused to concede to him authority over the Church of Saint Mark in their third of the city.

According to Eracles, it was the patriarch, Ralph of Mérencourt, who crowned Isabella II, daughter of King John, as the queen of Jerusalem in Tyre in August 1225. It is likely that Ralph had died in 1224 and that Isabella's coronation was instead conducted by Simon, who was the most senior Latin prelate present in Syria. Simon then accompanied Isabella on a sea voyage to the Kingdom of Sicily, where she joined her new husband, Emperor Frederick II. Frederick soon took over the government of the Kingdom of Jerusalem from Isabella's father, and Isabella's entourage—including Simon—recognized him as the new king. In return for his support, Frederick made Simon chancellor of Jerusalem. Within a few years, Simon fell out with Frederick—or at least distanced himself from him—and left the chancery, probably by resigning.

== Patriarchate ==
Simon never returned to Tyre or Syria after escorting Isabella to Sicily. By 1229, he had become the first Latin prelate from Syria to be translated outside Syria when he was made the patriarch of Constantinople. He was apparently appointed by the pope—either Honorius III or Gregory IX—without any input from the canons of Hagia Sophia. He was the first Latin patriarch of Constantinople who was not from Venice, thus breaking the monopoly on the patriarchate which the Venetians had held since the founding of the Latin Empire of Constantinople in 1204. Simon was also made papal legate.

Simon was still in Italy in April 1229 when he, as patriarch, witnessed the treaty by which his former patron, John, became the Latin emperor of Constantinople. He arrived in Constantinople in 1231 and was instructed by Pope Gregory IX to conduct preparations for John's entry. His pontificate was marked by disputes with his cathedral's chapter. He ousted seven of the canons of Hagia Sophia, who then complained to the pope and obtained his support; these canons may have been Venetians, in which case Simon may have been trying to break Venice's hold on the chapter. On the other occasion that he is known to have ousted a canon, the man was indeed Venetian.

Simon appears to have been close to John as they settled into their new roles as patriarch and emperor, but the cooperation was cut short by Simon's death in early 1233.
