= Stephanie of Armenia =

Armenian princess (d. 1220)

Stephanie/Rita
- Born: after 1195; Armenia
- Died: June 1220
- Spouse: John, King of Jerusalem (m. 1214)
- Issue: John, Crown Prince of Armenia
- Dynasty: Rubenid
- Father: Leo I of Armenia
- Mother: Isabelle of Antioch
- Religion: Armenian Orthodox, later probably Roman Catholic

Stephanie of Armenia (after 1195 – June 1220), also known as Rita, was a member of the Rubenid dynasty and claimant to the throne of the Armenian Kingdom of Cilicia.

Stephanie was the only child of Leo I of Armenia by his first wife, Isabelle. Stephanie's maternal family is disputed. It is believed that her mother was a niece of Sybille, wife of Bohemond III of Antioch. Stephanie was brought up by her paternal grandmother, Rita of Barbaron. She was around ten years old when her mother died, having not had any more children with Leo. Around 1210 Stephanie's father remarried to Sibylla, daughter of Isabella I of Jerusalem. From this marriage she gained a half-sister, Isabella.

In April 1214, Stephanie married John, King of Jerusalem. John had only recently lost his first wife, Queen Maria, who was a sister of Stephanie's stepmother Sibylla. Stephanie was a bad stepmother to John's daughter, Isabella II, on whose behalf John ruled Jerusalem as regent. Stephanie herself gave birth in 1216 to a son named John.

In May, 1219 Stephanie's father died. He had made the barons swear an oath of allegiance to his great-nephew Raymond-Roupen, who became his heir. However, on his death bed King Leo changed the succession. He made his daughter Isabella his heir and released the barons from their oath of allegiance. Stephanie was still alive at the time and would have had more right because she was the older daughter. Also, Stephanie had a son. Stephanie's husband, John, pressed the claim on behalf of his wife. Raymond-Roupen also pressed his claim on the throne.

John left the Fifth Crusade in February 1220 intending to visit Cilicia to press his family's claim. In June, however, Stephanie died; it was gossiped that John had beaten her to death after she tried to poison her stepdaughter, Isabella. Stephanie's young son died shortly afterwards. John of Brienne had no longer a claim on the throne of Cilicia.

== Sources ==
Runciman, Steven (1989). A History of the Crusades, Volume III: The Kingdom of Acre and the Later Crusades. Cambridge University Press. ISBN 0-521-06163-6.
