= Ralph of Mérencourt =

Roman Catholic archbishop

Ralph of Mérencourt (French: Raoul) was the Latin patriarch of Jerusalem from 1214 to 1224, succeeding the assassinated Albert Avogadro.

== Early career in patriarchal service ==
Ralph was a native of the County of Champagne. He seems to have come to the Holy Land as part of the entourage following Henry II, count of Champagne and future husband of Isabella I, queen of Jerusalem. Ralph worked as a notary in the High Court in Acre. In 1206, Albert, formerly bishop of Vercelli, arrived as the new patriarch, following upon Soffredo Gaetani, who resigned the office after only one year, and went off to join the Fourth Crusade in Constantinople.

In 1208, Albert sent Ralph as part of an official delegation to Philip Augustus, king of France, to seek a husband and king-consort for the young heiress to the throne of Jerusalem, Maria of Montferrat. King Philip Augustus, with the encouragement of Blanche of Navarre, countess-regent of Champagne, selected one of her feudal vassals, John of Brienne. John held the title of count of Brienne on behalf of his brother Walter III of Brienne, whose cause had briefly attracted the young Giovanni Bernadone (later Francis of Assisi) to his cause. At Walter's death in 1205, John held the county as guardian for Walter's son, later to become count of Jaffa.

John of Brienne arrived in Acre on 13 September 1210 and married Maria the following day, the feast of the Exaltation of the Holy Cross, the major feast of the Kingdom of Jerusalem. The two were then crowned king and queen of Jerusalem on 3 October in the cathedral of Tyre. The patriarch recommended Ralph to become the chancellor and guide for the newly arrived monarch. Queen Maria died shortly after giving birth to their daughter, Isabella II. The barons of the kingdom were uncertain of John of Brienne's ability to lead. In 1211, Albert sent Ralph to seek the counsel of Pope Innocent III. He returned with clear instructions to support John as regent-king for his daughter.

== Patriarch ==
=== Election ===
A letter sent by Ralph to Pope Honorius III outlining the Mongol threat around 1221

At Albert's assassination on 14 September 1214, while in procession to the cathedral of the Holy Cross in Acre, the post of patriarch became open. The canons of the Holy Sepulchre, following their own custom in imitation of the Acts of the Apostles, selected two candidates to succeed Albert. One candidate was Lotario Rosario de Cremona, who had originally succeeded Albert as bishop of Vercelli, but who later became archbishop of Pisa. He occupied a position in the Roman hierarchy that was very similar to the esteem enjoyed by Albert. The second candidate was the King of Jerusalem's own chancellor, Ralph of Mérencourt, who also held the episcopal see of Sidon. He was one of only three bishops installed by Albert during his years as patriarch. The king came down on the side of his chancellor and fellow countryman. Pope Innocent III ratified that choice, and Ralph was installed as patriarch during the Fourth Lateran Council, which took place in November 1215.

=== Fifth Crusade ===
Along with Pope Innocent III, Ralph gave a sermon on the first day of the council (11 November 1215), calling for a new crusade to recover the Holy Land. Further preparations for the crusade (the Fifth) were made on the last day of the council, 30 November. However, for various reasons, the crusade was postponed until 1217, after the death of Innocent. Ralph was appointed as one of Pope Honorius III's papal legates, and was escorted back to his see in Acre by John of Brienne, the nominal King of Jerusalem.

Ralph personally participated in the crusade against Egypt. The assembled crusader armies left Acre for Damietta in Egypt during the last days of May 1218. On 29 August 1219, an attack on Damietta failed, as St. Francis of Assisi had predicted. The successful taking of Damietta occurred by 5 November 1219. It is recounted that at one point the patriarch carried a relic of the True Cross, and prostrated himself with his head buried under the sand in order to ensure the success of the siege at Damietta. The whole crusade came to a disastrous end on 29 August 1221, when the crusading armies were trapped by the flooding waters of the Nile and the combined armies of the sultan, al-Kamil, and his two brothers, al-Mu'azzam and al-Ashraf. The sultan, after allowing the hostages to be ransomed, agreed to an eight-year truce.

=== Preparations for the Sixth Crusade ===
In 1222, the pope summoned John of Brienne, king of Jerusalem; Pelagius Galvani, the papal legate; patriarch Ralph, and other leaders to attend a meeting with him and the Holy Roman emperor, Frederick II, to be held in Verona on 11 November. The pope's illness forced the meeting to be postponed until 23 March 1223 at the imperial villa in Ferentino. There they struck an agreement to have King John's young daughter Isabella II marry the newly widowed Emperor Frederick II. Frederick then agreed to lead the next crusade and to have his fleet depart from Europe by 24 June 1225.

On 1 March 1224, Honorius III wrote to the patriarch of Jerusalem of the imminent departure of the imperial fleet, and to prepare for the marriage of Queen Isabella II to the emperor. Any and all impediments were to be cleared away. Patriarch Ralph, John of Brienne and Hermann von Salza met with the pope in the summer of 1224 to deal with the emperor's announcement that conditions in Sicily had so deteriorated that he could not possibly depart for the Holy Land at this time. A new date for departure was arrived at. As a new patriarch was nominated and in place by May 1225, it would seem that Ralph died in late 1224. His replacement, Gérold of Lausanne, bishop of Valence and former abbot of Cluny, was elected on 10 May 1225.

Catholic Church titles
Preceded by Albert Avogadro	Latin Patriarch of Jerusalem; 1215–1224	Succeeded by Gerald of Lausanne
