= Sibylla of Cyprus =

Queen of Armenia from 1210 to 1219

Sibylla

Queen consort of Armenia
- Tenure: 1210–1219
- Born: 1198
- Died: 1230–1252
- Spouse: Leo I, King of Armenia
- Issue: Isabella, Queen of Armenia
- House: Lusignan
- Father: Aimery, King of Cyprus
- Mother: Isabella I, Queen of Jerusalem

Sibylla of Cyprus (French: Sibyl; 1198 – 1230 to 1252) was the queen of Armenia from 1210 until 1219 as the second wife of King Leo I. A member of the House of Lusignan, she was the daughter of Queen Isabella I of Jerusalem and King Aimery of Cyprus. Her half-brother, King Hugh I of Cyprus, married her off to the 60-year-old King Leo when she was 12. She had one child, Isabella, who succeeded Leo as queen when he died in 1219. She had a strong claim to the throne of Jerusalem, but her Armenian marriage made it difficult to enforce.

== Family ==
Sibylla was born in 1198 into the House of Lusignan. She was the elder daughter of Queen Isabella I of Jerusalem and her fourth husband, King Aimery of Cyprus. While Aimery's children from his first marriage carried Lusignan names, those born to him and Isabella were named after their maternal relatives; Sibylla was named after her mother's half-sister Queen Sibylla of Jerusalem. Because their mother already had four daughters from her previous marriages, Sibylla and her sister, Melisende, had little chance of inheriting the crown of Jerusalem. The validity of Isabella's second and third marriages, to Margrave Conrad of Montferrat and Count Henry II of Champagne, respectively, were disputed because her first husband, Humphrey IV of Toron, lived until 1198. This cast doubt on the legitimacy of Sibylla's older maternal half-sisters, Maria of Montferrat and Alice and Philippa of Champagne. The legitimacy of Sibylla and Melisende was not questioned.

King Aimery, Queen Isabella, and their young son, Amalric–who had stood to inherit the Kingdom of Jerusalem from Isabella–all died in 1205. Isabella was succeeded by Maria, the eldest of her five surviving daughters, while Aimery's Kingdom of Cyprus passed to Hugh I, his son from his first marriage. Sibylla became a ward at Hugh's court.

Sibylla's close family, with her mother's marriages in Arabic numerals and her father's in Roman

(1) Humphrey IV of Toron						(4) Aimery of Cyprus		(I) Eschiva of Ibelin
(2) Conrad of Montferrat	(II) Isabella I of Jerusalem		(3) Henry II of Champagne
Maria of Jerusalem	Alice of Champagne	Philippa of Champagne		Sibylla of Cyprus	Melisende of Cyprus		Burgundia of Cyprus		Helvis of Cyprus	Hugh I of Cyprus

== Queenship ==
In 1210, King Leo I of Armenia visited Cyprus and Hugh, who had just reached his age of majority, arranged for his half-sister Sibylla to marry Leo and his full sister, Helvis, to marry Leo's grandnephew and designated heir, Raymond-Roupen. Sibylla was 12 and Leo 60. The Armenian chronicler Kirakos of Gandzak records that Leo married Sibylla "to secure assistance", but does not elaborate on that. The marriage enraged his subjects, and there was an unsuccessful attempt to prevent him from returning to his kingdom in Cilicia.

The countess of Champagne, Blanche of Navarre, wished to challenge the right of Sibylla's half-sisters Alice and Philippa to the County of Champagne and thus demanded an inquiry into the legality of their mother's second and third marriages. Pope Innocent III was not convinced that the marriages were legal. Had he made such a decision, Sibylla–as the elder of the two daughters born of Isabella's undisputed marriage with Aimery–would have been seen as the rightful heir to the throne of Jerusalem. It is unlikely, however, that the barons of the kingdom would have accepted Sibylla's Armenian husband, Leo, as king, and the Pope thus declined to pursue the matter.

Sibylla and Leo had one child, Isabella, born in 1215 and named after Sibylla's mother. Leo had a daughter from his first marriage, Rita (Stephanie). On his deathbed in mid 1219 Leo changed his mind and named Isabella, Sibylla's daughter, as his heir. Rita's husband, John of Brienne, pressed her claim, but she and their son died. Raymond-Roupen, to whom Leo had earlier promised succession, invaded Cilicia and captured Tarsus, while the nobles accepted Sibylla's daughter as queen under the regency of Adam of Baghras and then Constantine of Baberon. In 1221 Constantine dislodged Raymond-Roupen, securing Isabella on the throne.

According to the Armenian chronicler Sempad the Constable, Queen Sibylla was sober and pious. She died between 1230 and 1252.

Sibylla's relationship with the claimants to the Armenian throne

Stephen of Armenia
Roupen III of Armenia	Aimery of Cyprus	Isabella I of Jerusalem
Constantine of Baberon
Alice of Armenia	Isabella	Leo I of Armenia	Sibylla of Cyprus
Raymond-Roupen of Antioch	Helvis of Cyprus	Maria of Jerusalem	John of Brienne	Stephanie of Armenia	Isabella of Armenia	Hethum I of Armenia	Sempad the Constable
Maria of Antioch	Isabella II of Jerusalem	John of Brienne	kings of Armenia
