= Leo I, King of Armenia =

King of Armenian Cilicia from 1198/99 to 1219

Levon II Լևոն Բ
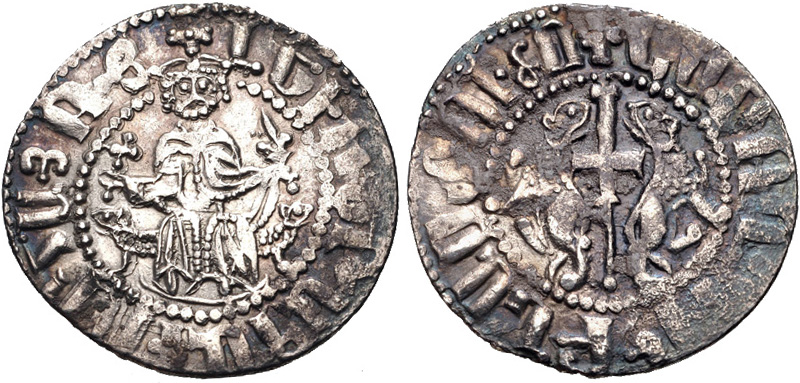
- A silver dram of Levon I

King of Armenian Cilicia
- Reign: 1198/1199–1219
- Coronation: 6 January 1198/1199; Church of Holy Wisdom (Tarsus)
- Successor: Isabella

Lord of Cilicia
- Reign: 1187–1198/1199
- Predecessor: Roupen III
- Born: 1150
- Died: 2 May 1219 (aged 68–69)
- Burial: Sis (his body); Convent of Akner (his heart and entrails)
- Spouse: Isabella; Sibylla of Cyprus
- Issue: Stephanie of Armenia; Isabella, Queen of Armenia
- House: Roupenians
- Father: Stephen
- Mother: Rita of Barbaron
- Religion: Oriental Orthodoxy

Leo I (Armenian: Լեւոն Ա Մեծագործ, romanized: Levon I. Metsagorts; 1150 – 2 May 1219) (Note: also spelled Leon II, Levon II or Lewon II) was the tenth lord of Armenian Cilicia, ruling from 1187 to 1219, and the first king to be crowned, in 1198/9 (sometimes known as Levon I the Magnificent). (Note: alternatively spelled as Lewon I) Leo eagerly led his kingdom alongside the armies of the Third Crusade and provided the crusaders with provisions, guides, pack animals and all manner of aid.

He was consecrated as king on 6 January 1199 or 1198

== Early years ==
Coat of arms of Leo I, King of Armenia

He was the younger son of Stephen, the third son of Leo I, lord of Armenian Cilicia. His mother was Rita, a daughter of Sempad, Lord of Barbaron. Leo's father, who was on his way to attend a banquet given by the Byzantine governor of Cilicia, Andronicus Euphorbenus, was murdered on 7 February 1165. Following their father's death, Leo and his elder brother Roupen lived with their uncle.

Their paternal uncle, Mleh I, lord of Armenian Cilicia had made a host of enemies by his cruelties in his country, resulting in his assassination by his own soldiers in the city of Sis in 1175. The seigneurs of Cilician Armenia elected Leo's brother, Roupen III to occupy the throne of the principality. Roupen III sent Leo to surround Hethum's mountain lair. But Bohemond III, rushing to the aid of Hethum, treacherously made Roupen prisoner. During 1187, he became the ruler.

== His rule ==
In 1187, he was forced to engage in a war against Aleppo and Damascus, an arduous war in which he actually forced the allied forces to retreat. This first success of Leo is of great significance from a historical perspective, for at the same time that Saladin had begun his decisive battle against the Latin state of Jerusalem, the forces of Leo drew away the attention of some part of his forces and this way easing the pressure on the crusaders.

=== Prince of Cilicia ===
The Armenian Kingdom of Cilicia (1199–1375)

Leo was a valiant and learned prince; he enlarged his principality and became the master of many provinces. A few days only after his taking possession of the country, the descendants of Ismael, under the command of one Roustam, advanced and came against Cilicia. Leo was not frightened, but confiding in God, who destroyed Sanacherib, he vanquished with a few men the great army of the infidels. Roustam himself was killed by St. George, the whole Hagarenian army then fled and dispersed; the Armenians pursued them and enriched themselves with the treasure. The power of Leo thus increased, and being confident in his strength, he chased the Tadjiks [name used by Armenian chroniclers to designate the Saracens, particularly the Seljuks] and pursued the Turks; he conquered Isauria and came as far as Iconium; he captured Heraclea, and again gave it up for a large ransom; he blockaded Caesarea, and had nearly taken it; he made a treaty with the Sultan of Iconium, and received a large sum of money from him; he surrounded Cilicia on every side with forts and castles; he built a new church called Agner, and was exceedingly generous to all monasteries erected by his ancestors; his bounty extended itself even to the leprous; they being shunned by everybody and expelled from every place, he assigned to them a particular house, and provided them with necessaries.

— Vahram of Edessa: The Rhymed Chronicle of Armenia Minor

=== Coronation ===
Leo was crowned on 6 January 1198 (or 1199) in the Hagia Sophia at Tarsus, the traditional place of coronation for the monarchs of Cilician Armenia.

=== Antiochene War of Succession ===
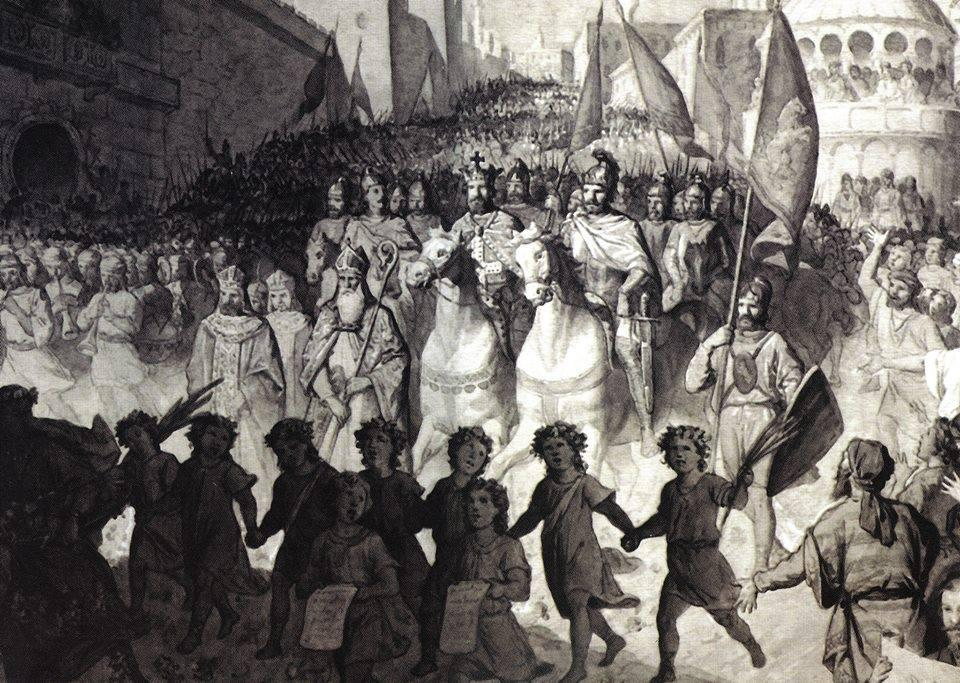
Triumphant entry of Leo the Magnificent into Antioch. Juliano Zasso, 1885

In this period the kat'oghikos, lord Yohanes, went to King Leo having heard blameworthy information about /the unfaithfulness/ of the lady of Antioch, whom the king had /as a wife/. /Yohanes/ related /these matters/ to the king in private. As the king was very emotional, he ordered that many of the woman's relatives be ruined, and he violently struck the woman with his own hands, wanting to slay her on the spot. Kostand, the son of his uncle Vasak, was barely able to escape, half-dead, with his life, and he was sent in fetters to Vahka.

— Smbat Sparapet: Chronicle

In Cyprus between 28 January 1210/27 January 1211 Leo married Sibylle, the half-sister of King Hugh I of Cyprus.

== Last years ==
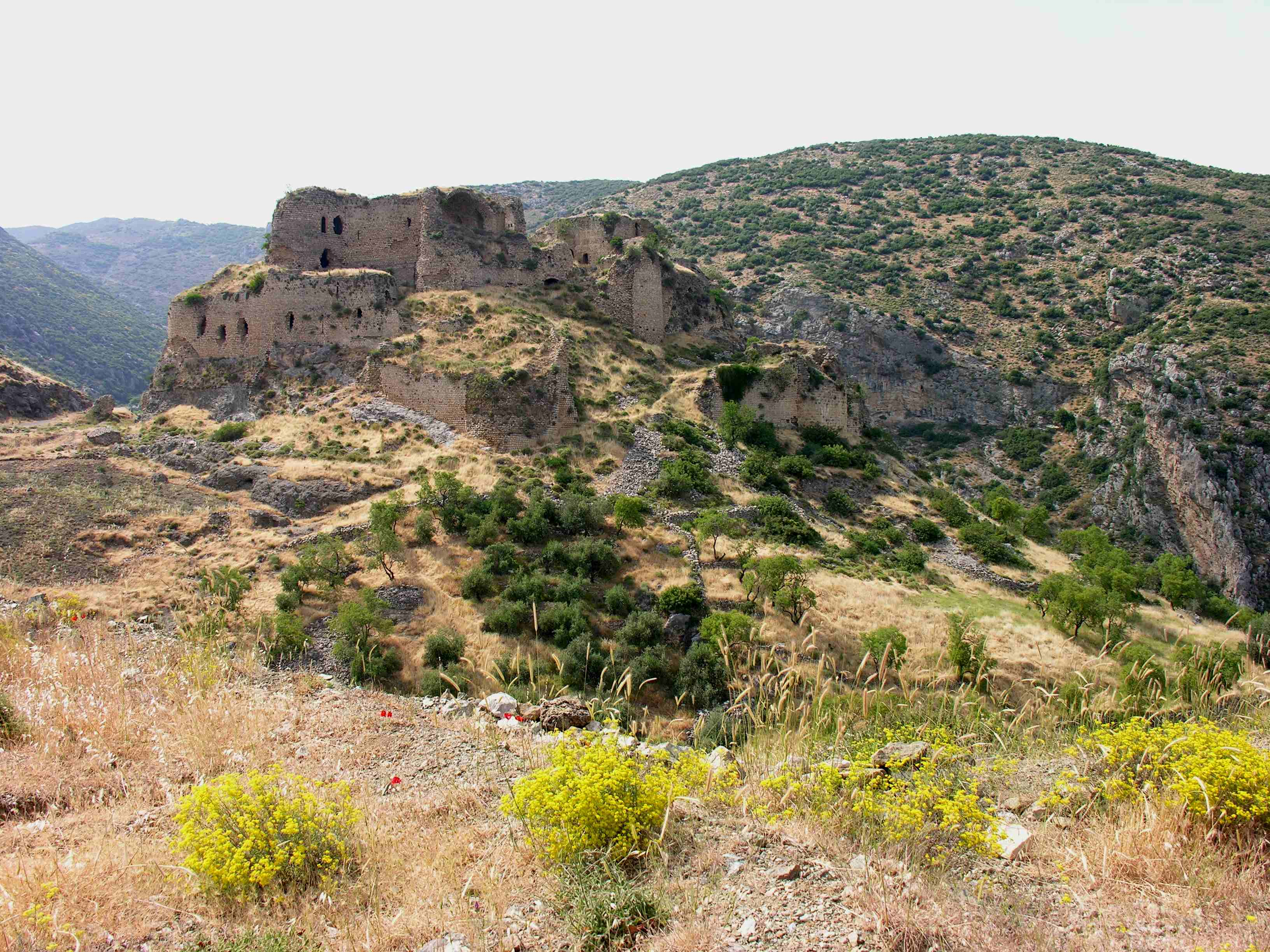
The ruins of Baghras Castle

Leo, having governed the country twelve years as Baron and twenty-two as King, felt his end approaching, and appointed in an assembly of the whole nobility of the kingdom, a certain baron named Atan to be Regent of the country and guardian of his daughter. Leo died soon after and was buried in the church of Agner; a part of his body was brought into the town of Sis, and a church was built thereupon.

— Vahram of Edessa: The Rhymed Chronicle of Armenia Minor

He was a benevolent, ingenuous man without a grudge toward anyone, who took his refuge in God and guided his principality accordingly. He was a wise, brilliant man, a skilled horseman, brave-hearted in battle, with attention to human and divine charity, energetic and happy of countenance.

— Smbat Sparapet: Chronicle

== Marriages and children ==
# (1) 3 February 1188 – 4 February 1189, divorced 1206: Isabelle (? – Vahka, 1207), a daughter of a brother of Sibylle, the wife of Bohemond III of Antioch

- Rita (Stephanie) (after 1195 – June 1220), the wife of King John I of Jerusalem

# (2) 28 January 1210 – 27 January 1211: Sibylla (1199/1200 – after 1225), a daughter of King Amalric I of Cyprus and Isabella I of Jerusalem

- Queen Isabella I of Cilicia ( 27 January 1216 – 25 January 1217 – Ked, 23 January 1252)

== Sources ==
- Edwards, Robert W., The Fortifications of Armenian Cilicia, Dumbarton Oaks Studies XXIII, Dumbarton Oaks, Trustees for Harvard University, 1987, Washington, D.C.; ISBN 0-88402-163-7.
- Ghazarian, Jacob G: The Armenian Kingdom in Cilicia during the Crusades: The Integration of Cilician Armenians with the Latins (1080–1393); RoutledgeCurzon (Taylor & Francis Group), 2000, Abingdon; ISBN 0-7007-1418-9
- Hild, Friedrich; Hellenkemper, Hansgerd (1990). Kilikien und Isaurien [Cilicia and Isauria]. Tabula Imperii Byzantini. Vol. 5. Vienna: Austrian Academy of Sciences. ISBN 3-7001-1811-2.
- Prinzing, Günter (1997). "Zur Bedeutung und Geschichte des Lemberger Evangeliars" [On the significance and history of the Lemberg Evangeliary]. In Prinzing, Günter; Schmidt, Andrea (eds.). Das Lemberger Evangeliar. Eine armenische Bilderhandschrift [The Lemberg Evangeliary. An Armenian illuminated manuscript]. Sprachen und Kulturen des Christlichen Ostens. Vol. 2. Wiesbaden: Reichert. pp. 11–26. ISBN 3-88226-903-0.
- Nersessian, Sirarpie Der (1969) [1962]. "The Kingdom of Cilician Armenia". In Setton, Kenneth M.; Wolff, Robert Lee; Hazard, Harry W. (eds.). A History of the Crusades, Volume II: The Later Crusades, 1189–1311. Vol. 2 (Second ed.). Madison, Milwaukee, and London: University of Wisconsin Press. ISBN 0-299-04844-6.
- Nickerson Hardwicke, Mary (1969) [1962]. "The Crusader States, 1192–1243". In Setton, Kenneth M.; Wolff, Robert Lee; Hazard, Harry W. (eds.). A History of the Crusades, Volume II: The Later Crusades, 1189–1311. Vol. 2 (Second ed.). Madison, Milwaukee, and London: University of Wisconsin Press. ISBN 0-299-04844-6.
- Runciman, Steven (1954). A History of the Crusades, Volume III: The Kingdom of Acre and the Later Crusades. Vol. 3. Cambridge: Cambridge University Press.
- Van Cleve, Thomas C. (1969) [1962]. "The Fifth Crusade". In Setton, Kenneth M.; Wolff, Robert Lee; Hazard, Harry W. (eds.). A History of the Crusades, Volume II: The Later Crusades, 1189–1311. Vol. 2 (Second ed.). Madison, Milwaukee, and London: University of Wisconsin Press. ISBN 0-299-04844-6.

Regnal titles
Preceded by Roupen III	Lord of Cilicia; 1187–1198/1199	Became king
New title	King of Armenian Cilicia; 1198/1199-1219	Succeeded by Isabella
