= Isabella II of Jerusalem =

Queen of Jerusalem (r. 1212–1228)

Isabella II
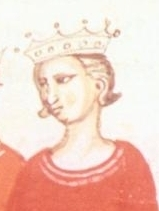
- Detail of a 13th-century depiction

Queen regnant of Jerusalem
- Reign: 1212 – May 1228
- Coronation: August 1225
- Predecessor: Maria and John
- Successor: Conrad II
- Co-rulers: John (1212–1225); Frederick (1225–1228)

Holy Roman Empress; Queen consort of Sicily
- Tenure: 1225 – 4 May 1228
- Born: late 1212
- Died: May 1228 (aged 15)
- Burial: Andria Cathedral
- Spouse: Frederick II, Holy Roman Emperor
- Issue: Margaret; Conrad IV of Germany
- House: House of Brienne
- Father: John of Brienne
- Mother: Maria of Montferrat

Isabella II (Old French: Ysabel; 1212 – May 1228), sometimes called Isabella of Brienne and erroneously Yolanda, (Note: In all the contemporary chronicles and in all the documents issued by her, her father, and her husband, she is named "Ysabel", "Ysabella", or variants thereof. From the seventeenth until the nineteenth century, the name "Yolanda" was frequently applied to Isabella's mother. From the nineteenth century it became attached to Isabella and has remained in use in historiography alongside the correct name.) was the queen of Jerusalem who reigned from 1212 to 1228. She was the daughter and successor of Maria of Montferrat, who died shortly after giving birth to her. Like her mother, Isabella died young before she could make an impression on politics.

Isabella's father, John of Brienne, ruled during her long minority; while he continued to regard himself as king for life, his opponents insisted that he was merely regent for Isabella. In 1223, John arranged for her to marry Emperor Frederick II, king of Sicily. A proxy wedding was held in the Kingdom of Jerusalem in August 1225, followed by Isabella's coronation as queen of Jerusalem. She then promptly departed for the Kingdom of Sicily, where she married Frederick in person. The marriage made her queen of Sicily and empress of the Holy Roman Empire. Defying his agreement with her father, Frederick declared himself king of Jerusalem immediately after their wedding and seized control of her kingdom. He sidelined Isabella, whose role in government was minimal. Her father's supporters alleged that Frederick abused her. She died shortly after giving birth to her only son, Conrad II, who succeeded her under Frederick's tutelage.

== Minority ==
=== Constitutional position ===
Isabella was born in late 1212 in the Kingdom of Jerusalem, then a rump state that did not include the city of Jerusalem. She was the only child of the queen of Jerusalem, Maria of Montferrat, who died from childbirth complications. The infant was named after Maria's mother and predecessor, Queen Isabella I. Isabella II thus inherited the kingdom within days of her birth, but the situation was unprecedented because her father, John of Brienne, was still alive. He had become king when he married Maria and expected to keep the crown for his lifetime. While most nobles were apparently willing to still recognize him as king, a faction aligned with the powerful Ibelin family considered John's reign to be over and held that, at best, he could rule only as regent on Isabella's behalf. In a letter of condolence on Maria's death, Pope Innocent III promised to John that he would support him and Isabella, and further wrote to Prince Bohemond IV of Antioch and the clergy of the Kingdom of Jerusalem to instruct them to do the same.

Isabella I had left five daughters from three marriages: Maria of Montferrat, Alice and Philippa of Champagne, and Sibylla and Melisende of Cyprus. Alice, then queen of Cyprus, was the eldest of Isabella II's half-aunts and thus her heir presumptive. Because Alice and Philippa held a strong claim to the County of Champagne, Blanche of Navarre, the ruling countess, pressed for an inquiry into the validity of Isabella I's marriages, hoping to weaken the sisters' position by questioning their legitimacy. Her argument carried weight: Isabella I's childless first marriage to Humphrey IV of Toron had been annulled under dubious circumstances, and Humphrey lived throughout her two subsequent unions. Maria, Isabella II's mother, was herself the child of one of these disputed marriages. Nevertheless, Pope Innocent III refused to pursue the case, likely wary of the political consequences in the Latin East, and Isabella II's claim to the throne of Jerusalem stood unchallenged.

Isabella II's family in the Latin East, with marriages (dashed) in sequence

(1) Amalric of Jerusalem	Maria Komnene	(2) Balian of Ibelin
John of Ibelin	Philip of Ibelin	Helvis of Ibelin
(1) Humphrey IV of Toron	(4) Aimery of Cyprus
(2) Conrad of Montferrat	Isabella I of Jerusalem	(3) Henry II of Champagne	Balian of Sidon
John of Brienne	Maria of Montferrat	Alice of Champagne	Philippa of Champagne	Sibylla of Cyprus	Melisende of Cyprus
Isabella II of Jerusalem

Isabella's father, King John, remarried in 1214. His second wife, Stephanie of Armenia, died in 1220. According to the Chronicle of Ernoul and Bernard the Treasurer, she had tried to poison Isabella; when John heard about it, he beat her so hard that–rumor had it–she died from it. The historians Ludwig Böhm and Guy Perry dismiss this account. In 1221, Isabella started giving her consent to her father's acts. In the only surviving such document, she is referred to simply as the king's daughter, in contrast to her mother, Maria, who had been titled "the honourable lady of the kingdom" prior to her coronation. The lack of reference to her status may reflect John's insistence that he was the reigning king rather than merely regent for Isabella.

=== Marriage negotiations ===
By the 13th century, the Kingdom of Jerusalem had been reduced to a narrow coastal strip and did not include Jerusalem itself.

In late 1222, after the failure of the Fifth Crusade, King John travelled to Europe to solicit support for the kingdom. Although she was only nine or ten, John took this opportunity to seek a husband for Isabella. The objective was to find a powerful leader who could summon substantial Western aid for the beleaguered kingdom. John nevertheless continued to regard the kingship as his for life and assumed that Isabella's future husband would only take up rule after John's death.

At a conference in Ferentino in March 1223, Isabella was proposed as a bride for Frederick II, the recently widowed emperor of the Holy Roman Empire and king of Sicily, who was preparing to lead the next crusade. The match was suggested by Hermann of Salza, grand master of the Teutonic Knights. Although John welcomed the prospect of such a distinguished alliance, he wavered until Hermann promised him the kingdom's government for life. Pope Honorius III may also have encouraged the union since he soon issued a dispensation permitting the couple to marry despite being third cousins. Frederick then persuaded John to remain in Europe and join the forthcoming crusade.

== Empress and queen ==
=== Ceremonies ===
At a conference in San Germano in July 1225, Frederick swore that he would depart on crusade by 15 August 1227 and received John's permission to marry Isabella without delay. A fleet was promptly sent to fetch her. Count Henry of Malta and James, archbishop-elect of Capua, reached Acre with fourteen imperial galleys in August. Isabella was married by proxy in the Cathedral of the Holy Cross, with James standing in for Frederick. She was then taken to Tyre and crowned queen of Jerusalem. The ceremony was attended by the leading nobles, including the constable and bailiff, Odo of Montbéliard; the archbishop of Tyre, Simon of Maugastel; and even the lord of Caesarea, Walter III, who had once been her father's opponent. The Ibelins, however, were absent. After a fortnight of celebrations, Isabella embarked together with the archbishop of Tyre and her cousin the lord of Sidon, Balian Grenier. According to the Gestes des Chiprois, a pro-Ibelin chronicle, Isabella made a stop at Cyprus, where she met with her aunt Queen Alice.

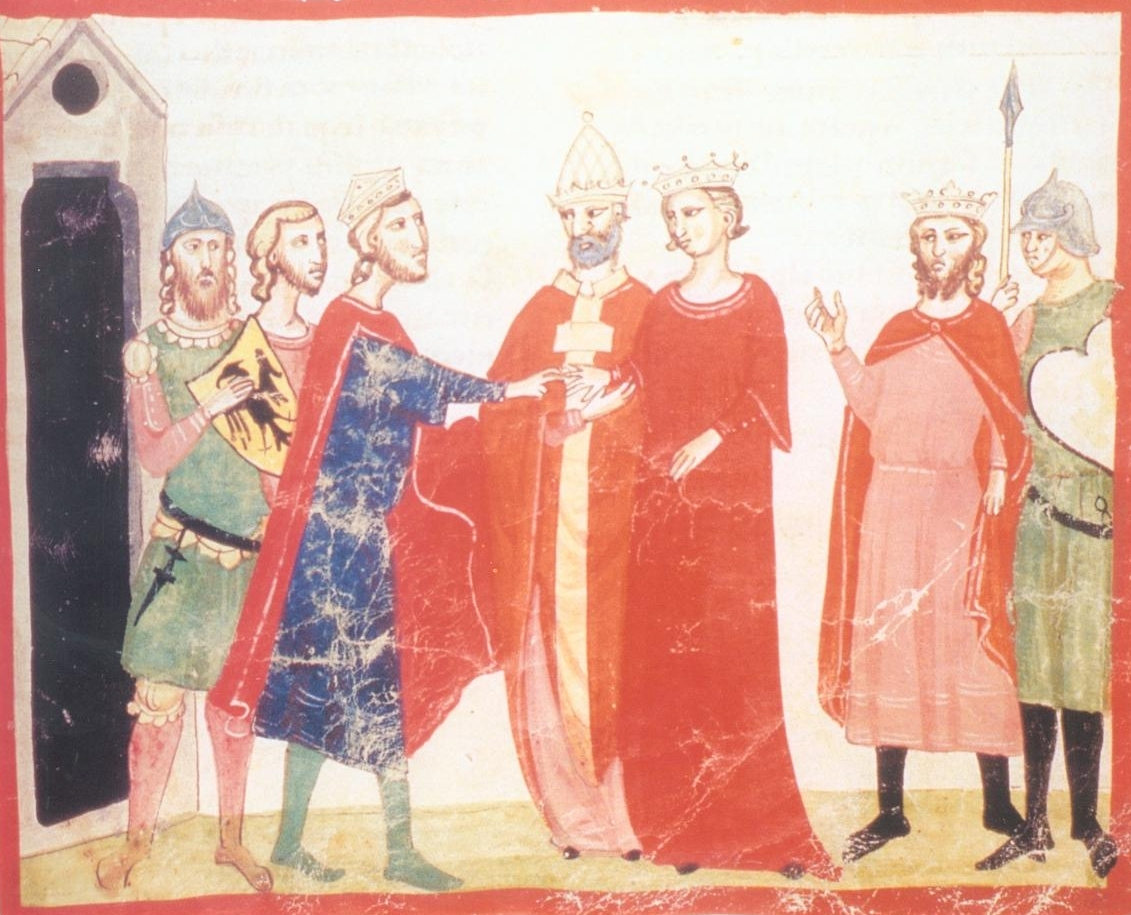
Isabella marrying Frederick in person after landing at Brindisi; she had earlier married him through a stand-in.

Isabella disembarked at Brindisi, where she was received with full imperial ceremony. Frederick and John awaited her there, and she was married to the 31-year-old emperor in person in the Cathedral of Saint John the Baptist on 9 November 1225. Isabella thus became also empress of the Holy Roman Empire and queen of Sicily.

=== Treatment and role ===
Shortly after the wedding, Frederick summoned John and declared that he would take all his wife's rights and the Kingdom of Jerusalem. Although this was clearly a breach of his agreement with John, the leading figures of the kingdom who had arrived with Isabella–including Balian, lord of Sidon, and Simon, archbishop of Tyre, one of John's chief supporters among the clergy–accepted Frederick as their new king. Frederick then sent a delegation to the kingdom, where the bailiff, Odo of Montbéliard, promptly recognized Frederick and was reconfirmed as bailiff in Frederick's name. Because Isabella was the rightful heir and queen regnant, Frederick's assumption of power rested on firm legal grounds. According to the Estoire d'Eracles, John had expected to continue as regent at least until Isabella reached the age of majority in 1227. For the next six years, the Holy See refused to address Frederick as king of Jerusalem and continued to recognize John.

According to the Colbert–Fontainebleau continuation of the Estoire d'Eracles, Frederick seduced John's niece, a cousin and companion of Isabella, soon after the wedding, and Isabella informed her father about this in tears. Several contemporary sources state that Frederick mistreated Isabella. Isabella became pregnant soon after the wedding. Ernoul-Bernard narrates that, when in 1226 John went to Lombardy to incite a rebellion against the emperor, Frederick beat Isabella so hard that she almost miscarried. In November 1226, she give birth a daughter, Margaret, but the baby died in August 1227.

Perry does not credit the stories of domestic abuse or illicit seduction. (Note: Isabella likely did have a cousin in her entourage, namely John's niece Margaret of Reynel, who was married to Balian of Sidon.) The historian David Abulafia says that the "hostile tales" come from sources close to John. He concedes that the emperor may have neglected his wife in favor of his harem women, but also notes that the couple frequently travelled together. The historian Alan V. Murray speculates that Frederick might have denied Isabella autonomy because he was mindful of the disputes between his own parents, Emperor Henry VI and Empress Constance, over the governance of the Kingdom of Sicily and Constance's role in it as queen regnant.

Soon after the wedding, Frederick placed Isabella in relative seclusion in his harem at Palermo. The young empress was isolated from her kin and supporters in the Latin East. When in September 1227 Frederick finally set sail to her kingdom to fulfill his promise to lead a crusade, he did not take her with him; he left the fleet after an outbreak of malaria and was swiftly excommunicated by the new pope, Gregory IX. Mainly because her life was cut short, but also because her husband sidelined her, Isabella had a minimal role in government. Frederick issued royal charters for her kingdom together with her, of which one survives and mentions her consent. Isabella also issued the first charter since Melisende's reign (1131–1152) in which a queen of Jerusalem appeared as the principal grantor; in this document, a donation to the Teutonic Order, she is named "Isabella, by the grace of God, empress of the Romans, semper augusta, queen of Jerusalem and Sicily". The title presumably appeared on her seal, which has not survived. These documents have been cited as evidence that she held political power and exercised it jointly with her husband.

== Death and posterity ==
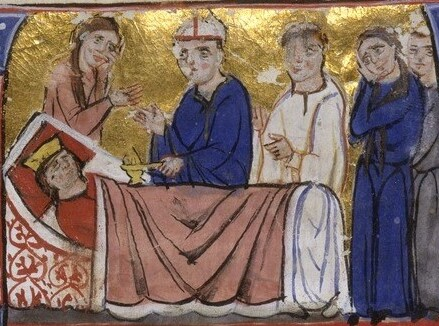
Like her mother, Isabella died upon giving birth to her successor.

Isabella gave birth on 25 April 1228 and died a few days after aged fifteen. (Note: The date of Isabella's death is variously given as April, 1 May, 4 May, or 5 May.) Like her mother, she left behind a newborn who succeeded her–a son, Conrad II. She was buried in the Cathedral of Saint Peter in Andria. Rumors, probably approved by her father and described by Abulafia as "blatant nonsense", alleged that Frederick had killed Isabella. The news of her death reached her kingdom that summer. Although it reduced his status to that of a guardian for the infant king, Frederick continued to view himself as king of Jerusalem.

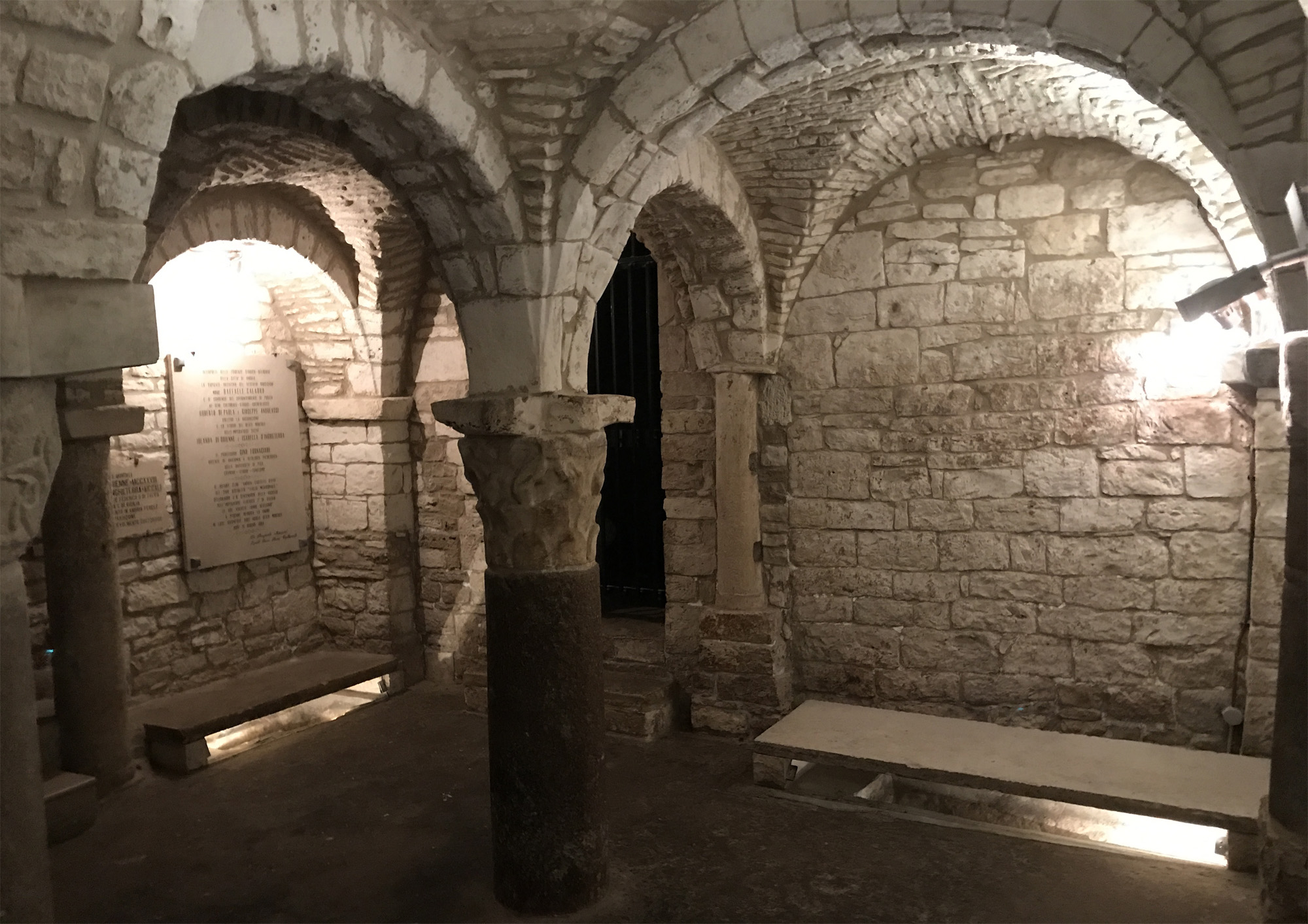
Isabella was buried in the crypt of the Andria Cathedral along with her husband's next wife, Isabella of England.

Thanks to Isabella II's marriage, the Kingdom of Jerusalem passed to a series of largely absentee kings until it fell 66 years later. Her son, Conrad, later succeeded Frederick as king of Germany. Like Isabella I and Maria, Isabella II is for the most part neglected–"frequently referred to, but little more than that"–in the studies of the kings and queens of Jerusalem. Perry argues that "she simply did not live long enough to have much impact".

== Notes ==
Regnal titles
Preceded by Maria; John	Queen regnant of Jerusalem; 1212–1228 with Frederick (1225-1228)	Succeeded by Conrad II
Royal titles
Vacant Title last held by Constance of Aragon	Queen consort of Sicily; 1225–1228	Vacant Title next held by Isabella of England
Vacant Title last held by Constance of Aragon	Holy Roman Empress; 1225–1228	Vacant Title next held by Isabella of England
