= John of Brienne =

King of Jerusalem (1210–1225) and Latin Emperor of Constantinople (1229–1237)

John
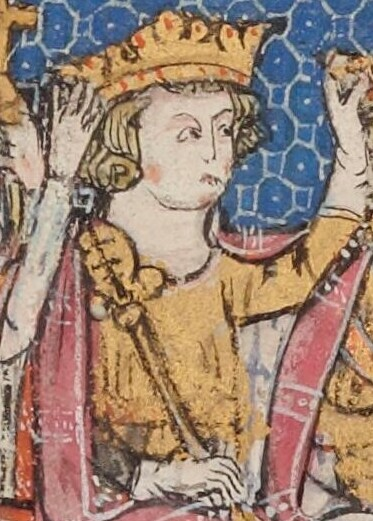
- Detail of a 14th-century miniature

Latin Emperor of Constantinople
- Reign: 1229–1237
- Coronation: 1231
- Co-ruler: Baldwin II

King of Jerusalem
- Reign: 1210–1225 (also regent for Isabella II from 1212)
- Coronation: 3 October 1210
- Predecessor: Maria
- Successor: Isabella II and Frederick
- Co-rulers: Maria (1210–1212); Isabella II (1212–1225)

Count of Brienne
- Reign: 1205/06–1221
- Predecessor: Walter III
- Successor: Walter IV
- Born: c. 1170
- Died: 19–23 March 1237 (aged 66–67); Constantinople
- Burial: Hagia Sophia, Constantinople (now Istanbul, Turkey)
- Spouses: Maria, Queen of Jerusalem (m. 1210; died 1212) Stephanie of Armenia (m. 1214; died 1220) Berengaria of León (m. 1224)
- Issue: Isabella II, Queen of Jerusalem; Marie, Latin Empress; Alphonse, Count of Eu; Louis, Viscount of Beaumont; John, Grand Butler of France
- House: Brienne
- Father: Érard II, Count of Brienne
- Mother: Agnes of Montfaucon

John of Brienne (c. 1170 – 19–23 March 1237) was the king of Jerusalem from 1210 to 1225 and Latin emperor of Constantinople from 1229 to 1237. He was the youngest son of Erard II of Brienne, a wealthy nobleman in Champagne. John, originally destined for an ecclesiastical career, became a knight and owned small estates in Champagne around 1200. After the death of his brother Walter III, he ruled the County of Brienne on behalf of his minor nephew Walter IV, who lived in Italy.

The barons of the Kingdom of Jerusalem proposed that John marry Maria, the heir to the kingdom. With the consent of Philip II of France and Pope Innocent III, he left France for the Holy Land; in 1210, he married Maria and they were crowned king and queen. After Maria's death in 1212, John administered the kingdom as regent for their infant daughter, Isabella II. Maria's influential uncle, John of Ibelin, attempted to depose him. King John was a leader of the Fifth Crusade. Although his claim of supreme command of the crusader army was never unanimously acknowledged, his right to rule Damietta (in Egypt) was confirmed shortly after the city fell to the crusaders in 1219. He claimed the Armenian Kingdom of Cilicia on behalf of his second wife, Stephanie, in 1220. After Stephanie and their infant son died that year, John returned to Egypt. The Fifth Crusade ended in failure (including the recovery of Damietta by the Egyptians) in 1221.

John was the first king of Jerusalem to visit Europe (Italy, France, England, León, Castile and Germany) to seek assistance for the Holy Land. He gave his daughter in marriage to Holy Roman Emperor Frederick II in 1225, and Frederick ended John's rule of the Kingdom of Jerusalem. Although the popes tried to persuade Frederick to restore the kingdom to John, the Jerusalemite barons regarded Frederick as their lawful ruler. John administered papal domains in Tuscany, became the podestà of Perugia and was a commander of Pope Gregory IX's army during Gregory's war against Frederick in 1228 and 1229.

John was elected emperor of the Latin Empire in 1229 as the senior co-ruler of Baldwin II, and he was crowned in Constantinople in 1231. John III of Nicaea and Ivan Asen II of Bulgaria occupied the last Latin territories in Thrace and Asia Minor, besieging Constantinople in early 1235. John directed the defence of his capital during the months-long siege, with the besiegers withdrawing only after Geoffrey II of Achaea and united fleets from Italian towns defeated their fleet in 1236. The following year, John died as a Franciscan friar.

== Early life ==
John was the youngest of the four sons of Count Erard II of Brienne and Agnes of Montfaucon. He seemed "exceedingly old ... about 80" to the 14-year-old George Akropolites in 1231; if Akropolites' estimate was correct, John was born around 1150. However, no other 13th-century authors described him as an old man. John's father referred to John's brothers as "children" in 1177 and mentioned the tutor of the oldest brother, Walter, in 1184; this suggests that John's brothers were born in the late 1160s. Modern historians agree that John was born after 1168, probably during the 1170s.

John's father destined him for a clerical career, but according to the late-13th-century Tales of the Minstrel of Reims, John "was unwilling". Instead, the minstrel continued, John fled to his maternal uncle at the Clairvaux Abbey. Encouraged by his fellows, he became a knight and earned a reputation in tournaments and fights. Although elements of the Tales of the Minstrel of Reims are apparently invented (for instance, John did not have a maternal uncle in Clairvaux), historian Guy Perry wrote that it may have preserved details of John's life. A church career was not unusual for youngest sons of 12th-century noblemen in France; however, if his father sent him to a monastery he left before reaching the age of taking monastic vows. John "clearly developed the physique that was necessary to fight well" in his youth, because the 13th-century sources Akropolites and Salimbene di Adam emphasize his physical strength.

John's father, Erard II, joined the Third Crusade and died in the Holy Land in 1191. His oldest son, Walter III, succeeded him in Brienne. John was first mentioned in an 1192 (or 1194) charter issued by Walter, indicating that he was a prominent figure in his brother's court. According to a version of Ernoul's chronicle, John participated in a war against Peter II of Courtenay. Although the Tales of the Minstrel of Reims claimed that he was called "John Lackland", according to contemporary charters John held Jessains, Onjon, Trannes and two other villages in the County of Champagne around 1200. In 1201, Theobald III of Champagne granted him additional estates in Mâcon, Longsols and elsewhere. Theobald's widow, Blanche of Navarre, persuaded John to sell his estate at Mâcon, saying that it was her dower.

Walter III of Brienne died in June 1205 while fighting in southern Italy. His widow, Elvira of Sicily, gave birth to a posthumous son, Walter IV, who grew up in Italy. John assumed the title of count of Brienne, and began administering the county on his nephew's behalf in 1205 or 1206. As a leading vassal of the count of Champagne, John frequented the court of Blanche of Navarre, who ruled Champagne during the minority of her son, Theobald IV. According to a version of Ernoul's chronicle, she loved John "more than any man in the world"; this annoyed King Philip II of France.

The two versions of Ernoul's chronicle tell different stories about John's ascent to the throne of Jerusalem. According to one version, the leading lords of Jerusalem sent envoys to France in 1208 asking Philip II to select a French nobleman as a husband for their kingdom's heir, Maria. Taking advantage of the opportunity to rid himself of John, Philip II suggested him. In the other version an unnamed knight encouraged the Jerusalemite lords to select John, who accepted their offer with Philip's consent. John visited Pope Innocent III in Rome. The pope donated 40,000 marks for the defence of the Holy Land, stipulating that John could spend the money only with the consent of the Latin patriarch of Jerusalem and the grand masters of the Knights Templar and the Knights Hospitaller.

== King of Jerusalem ==
=== Co-ruler ===
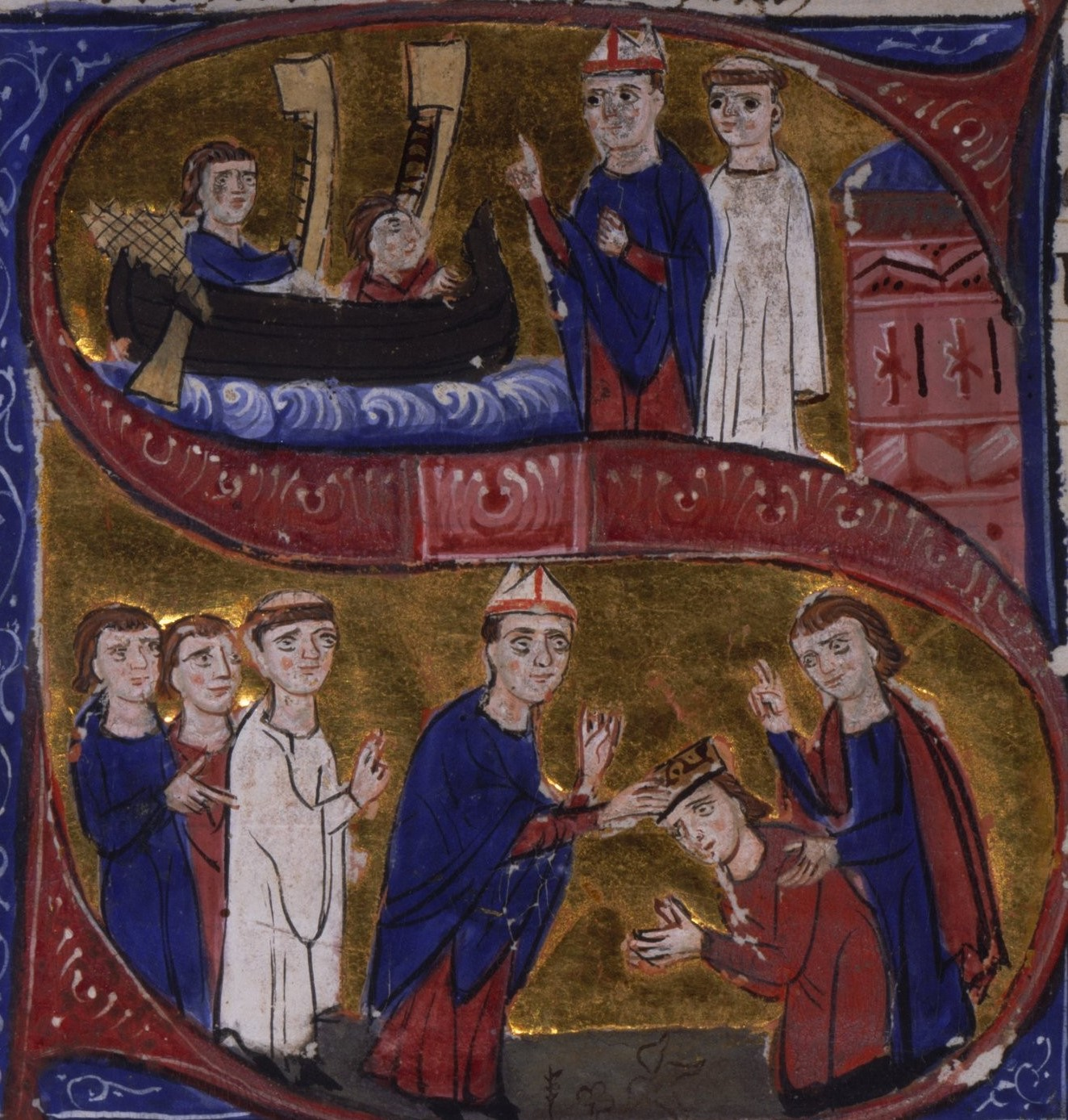
John's arrival and coronation

John landed at Acre on 13 September 1210; the following day, Patriarch of Jerusalem Albert of Vercelli married him to Maria. John and Maria were crowned king and queen in the Cathedral of Tyre on 3 October. The truce concluded by Maria's predecessor Aimery and the Ayyubid sultan Al-Adil I had ended by John's arrival. Although Al-Adil was willing to renew it, Jerusalemite lords did not want to sign a new treaty without John's consent. During John and Maria's coronation, Al-Adil's son Al-Mu'azzam Isa pillaged the area around Acre but did not attack the city. After returning to Acre, John raided nearby Muslim settlements in retaliation.

Although about 300 French knights accompanied John to the Holy Land, no influential noblemen joined him; they preferred participating in the French Albigensian Crusade or did not see him as sufficiently eminent. John's cousin, Walter of Montbéliard, joined him only after he was expelled from Cyprus. Walter led a naval expedition to Egypt to plunder the Nile Delta. After most of the French crusaders left the Holy Land, John forged a new truce with Al-Adil by the middle of 1211 and sent envoys to Innocent III urging him to preach a new crusade.

=== Conflicts ===
The Kingdom of Jerusalem and the other crusader states in the early 13th century

Queen Maria died shortly after giving birth to her and John's daughter, Isabella, in late 1212. Her death triggered a legal dispute, with John of Ibelin questioning the widowed king's right to rule. John of Ibelin was Maria's uncle and had served as her regent prior to her marriage to John. The king sent Ralph of Mérencourt, the bishop of Sidon, to Rome for assistance from the Holy See. Innocent III confirmed John as lawful ruler of the Holy Land in early 1213, urging the prelates to support him with ecclesiastical sanctions if needed. Most of the Jerusalemite lords remained loyal to the king, acknowledging his right to administer the kingdom on behalf of his infant daughter; John of Ibelin left the Holy Land and settled in Cyprus.

The relationship between John of Brienne and Hugh I of Cyprus was tense. Hugh ordered the imprisonment of John's supporters in Cyprus, releasing them only at Innocent's command. During the War of the Antiochene Succession, John sided with Bohemond IV of Antioch and the Templars against Raymond-Roupen of Antioch and Leo I of Armenia, who were supported by Hugh and the Hospitallers. However, John sent only 50 knights to fight the Armenians in Antiochia in 1213. Leo I concluded a peace treaty with the Knights Templar late that year, and he and John reconciled. John married Leo's oldest daughter, Stephanie (also known as Rita), in 1214 and Stephanie received a dowry of 30,000 bezants. Quarrels among John, Leo I, Hugh I and Bohemond IV are documented by Innocent III's letters urging them to reconcile their differences before the Fifth Crusade reached the Holy Land.

=== Fifth Crusade ===
Innocent proclaimed the Fifth Crusade in 1213, with the "liberation of the Holy Land" (the reconquest of Jerusalem) its principal object. The first crusader troops, commanded by Leopold VI of Austria, landed at Acre in early September 1217. Andrew II of Hungary and his army followed that month, and Hugh I of Cyprus and Bohemond IV of Antioch soon joined the crusaders. However, hundreds of crusaders soon returned to Europe because of a famine following the previous year's poor harvest. A war council was held in the tent of Andrew II, who considered himself the supreme commander of the crusader army. Other leaders, particularly John, did not acknowledge Andrew's leadership. The crusaders raided nearby territory ruled by Al-Adil I for food and fodder, forcing the sultan to retreat in November 1217. In December John besieged the Ayyubid fortress on Mount Tabor, joined only by Bohemond IV of Antioch. He was unable to capture it, which "encouraged the infidel", according to the contemporary Jacques de Vitry.

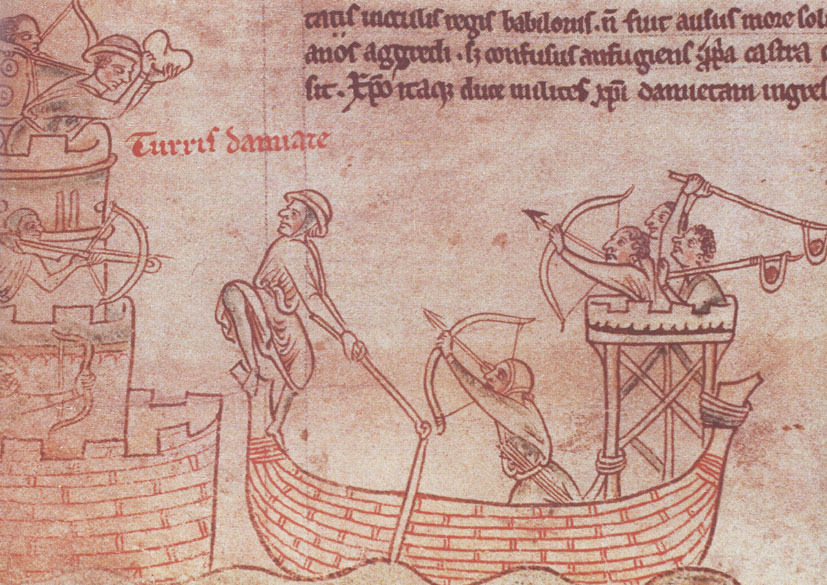
Frisian crusaders attack a tower near Damietta during the Fifth Crusade (from Matthew Paris' 13th-century Chronica Majora).

Andrew II decided to return home, leaving the crusaders' camp with Hugh I and Bohemond IV in early 1218. Although military action was suspended after their departure, the crusaders restored fortifications at Caesarea and Atlit. After new troops arrived from the Holy Roman Empire in April, they decided to invade Egypt. They elected John supreme commander, giving him the right to rule the land they would conquer. His leadership was primarily nominal, since he could rarely impose his authority on an army of troops from many countries.

The crusaders laid siege to Damietta, on the Nile, in May 1218. Although they seized a strategically important tower on a nearby island on 24 August, Al-Kamil (who had succeeded Al-Adil I in Egypt) controlled traffic on the Nile. In September, reinforcements commanded by Pope Honorius III's legate Cardinal Pelagius (who considered himself the crusade's supreme commander) arrived from Italy.

Egyptian forces attempted a surprise attack on the crusaders' camp on 9 October, but John discovered their movements. He and his retinue attacked and annihilated the Egyptian advance guard, hindering the main force. The crusaders built a floating fortress on the Nile near Damietta, but a storm blew it near the Egyptian camp. The Egyptians seized the fortress, killing nearly all of its defenders. Only two soldiers survived the attack; they were accused of cowardice, and John ordered their execution. Taking advantage of the new Italian troops, Cardinal Pelagius began to intervene in strategic decisions. His debates with John angered their troops. The soldiers broke into the Egyptian camp on 29 August 1219 without an order, but they were soon defeated and nearly annihilated. During the ensuing panic, only the cooperation of John, the Templars, the Hospitallers and the noble crusaders prevented the Egyptians from destroying their camp.

In late October, Al-Kamil sent messengers to the crusaders offering to restore Jerusalem, Bethlehem and Nazareth to them if they withdrew from Egypt. Although John and the secular lords were willing to accept the sultan's offer, Pelagius and the heads of the military orders resisted; they said that the Moslems could easily recapture the three towns. The crusaders ultimately refused the offer. Al-Kamil tried to send provisions to Damietta across their camp, but his men were captured on 3 November. Two days later, the crusaders stormed into Damietta and seized the town. Pelagius claimed it for the church, but he was forced to acknowledge John's right to administer it (at least temporarily) when John threatened to leave the crusaders' camp. According to John of Joinville, John seized one-third of Damietta's spoils; coins minted there during the following months bore his name. Al-Mu'azzam, emir of Damascus and brother of al-Kamil, invaded the Kingdom of Jerusalem and pillaged Caesarea before the end of 1219.

John's father-in-law, Leo I of Armenia, died several months before the crusaders seized Damietta. He bequeathed his kingdom to his infant daughter, Isabella. John and Raymond-Roupen of Antioch (Leo's nephew) questioned the will's legality, each demanding the Armenian Kingdom of Cilicia for themselves. In a February 1220 letter, Honorius III declared John to be Leo's rightful heir. Saying that he wanted to assert his claim to Cilicia, John left Damietta for the Kingdom of Jerusalem around Easter 1220. Although Al-Mu'azzam's successful campaign the previous year also pressed John to leave Egypt, Jacques de Vitry and other Fifth Crusade chroniclers wrote that he deserted the crusader army.

Stephanie died shortly after John's arrival. Contemporary sources accused John of causing her sudden death, claiming that he severely beat her when he heard that she tried to poison his daughter Isabella. Their only son died a few weeks later, ending John's claim to Cilicia. Soon after Honorius learned about the deaths of Stephanie and her son, he declared Raymond-Roupen the lawful ruler of Cilicia and threatened John with excommunication if he fought for his late wife's inheritance.

John did not return to the crusaders in Egypt for several months. According to a letter from the prelates in the Holy Land to Philip II of France, lack of funds kept John from leaving his kingdom. Since his nephew Walter IV was approaching the age of majority, John surrendered the County of Brienne in 1221. During John's absence from Egypt, Al-Kamil again offered to restore the Holy Land to the Kingdom of Jerusalem in June 1221; Pelagius refused him. John returned to Egypt and rejoined the crusade on 6 July 1221 at the command of Honorius III.

The commanders of the crusader army decided to continue the invasion of Egypt, despite (according to Philip d'Aubigny) John's strong opposition. The crusaders approached Mansurah, but the Egyptians imposed a blockade on their camp. Outnumbered, Pelagius agreed to an eight-year truce with Al-Kamil in exchange for Damietta on 28 August. John was among the crusade leaders held hostage by Al-Kamil until the crusader army withdrew from Damietta on 8 September.

=== Negotiations ===
After the Fifth Crusade ended "in colossal and irremediable failure", John returned to his kingdom. Merchants from Genoa and Pisa soon attacked each other in Acre, destroying a significant portion of the town. According to a Genoese chronicle, John supported the Pisans and the Genoese left Acre for Beirut.

John was the first king of Jerusalem to visit Europe, and had decided to seek aid from the Christian powers before he returned from Egypt. He also wanted to find a suitable husband for his daughter, to ensure the survival of Christian rule in the Holy Land. John appointed Odo of Montbéliard as a bailli to administer the Kingdom of Jerusalem in his absence.

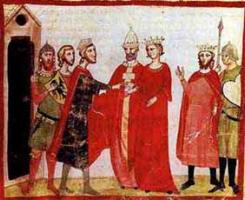
Marriage of John's daughter, Isabella II of Jerusalem, and Holy Roman Emperor Frederick II in 1225 (from Giovanni Villani's Nuova Cronica)

John left for Italy in October 1222 to attend a conference about a new crusade. At John's request, Honorius III declared that all lands conquered during the crusade should be united with the Kingdom of Jerusalem. To plan the military campaign, the pope and Holy Roman Emperor Frederick II met at Ferentino in March 1223; John attended the meeting. He agreed to give his daughter in marriage to Frederick II after the emperor promised that he would allow John to rule the Kingdom of Jerusalem for the rest of his life.

John then went to France, although Philip II was annoyed at being excluded from the decision of Isabella's marriage. Matilda I of Nevers, Erard II of Chacenay, Albert, the abbot of Vauluisant and other local potentates asked John to intervene in their conflicts, indicating that he was esteemed in his homeland. John attended the funeral of Philip II at the Basilica of St Denis in July; Philip bequeathed more than 150,000 marks for the defence of the Holy Land. John then visited England, attempting to mediate a peace treaty between England and France after his return to France.

John made a pilgrimage to Santiago de Compostela in March 1224. According to the Latin Chronicle of the Kings of Castile, he went to the Kingdom of León to marry one of the elder daughters of King Alfonso IX of León, Sancha or Dulce, because Alfonso had promised him the kingdom "along with her". The marriage could jeopardize the claim of King Ferdinand III of Castile, son of Alfonso and half-brother of Sancha and Dulce, to León. To protect her son's interests, Ferdinand's mother, Queen Berengaria of Castile, decided to give her daughter, Berengaria of León, to John in marriage. Although modern historians do not unanimously accept the chronicle's account of John's plan to marry Sancha or Dulce, they agree that Queen Berengaria's sister Blanche, queen of France, played an important role in convincing John to marry Berengaria of León. The marriage of John and Berengaria was celebrated in Burgos in May 1224.

About three months later, he met Frederick II's son Henry in Metz and visited Henry's guardian, Archbishop Engelbert of Cologne. From Germany John went to southern Italy, where he persuaded Honorius III to allow Frederick II to postpone his crusade for two years. Frederick married John's daughter, Isabella (who had been crowned queen of Jerusalem), on 9 November 1225. John and Frederick's relationship became tense. According to a version of Ernoul's chronicle, John got into a disagreement with his new son-in-law because Frederick seduced a niece of Isabella who was her lady-in-waiting. In the other version of the chronicle John often "chastised and reproved" Frederick, who concluded that John wanted to seize the Kingdom of Sicily for his nephew Walter IV of Brienne and tried to murder John (who fled to Rome). Frederick declared that John had lost his claim to the Kingdom of Jerusalem when Isabella married him; he styled himself king of Jerusalem for the first time in December 1225. Balian of Sidon, Simon of Maugastel, the archbishop of Tyre, and the other Jerusalemite lords who had escorted Isabella to Italy acknowledged Frederick as their lawful king.

== Papal service ==
Honorius did not accept Frederick's unilateral act and continued to regard John as the rightful king of Jerusalem. In an attempt to take advantage of the revived Lombard League (an alliance of northern Italian towns) against Frederick II, John went to Bologna. According to a version of Ernoul's chronicle, he declined an offer by the Lombard League representatives to elect him their king. Even though this account was fabricated, John remained in Bologna for over six months. The dying Honorius appointed John rector of a Patrimony of Saint Peter in Tuscany (part of the Papal States) on 27 January 1227, and urged Frederick II to restore him to the throne of the Kingdom of Jerusalem. Honorius' successor, Gregory IX, confirmed John's position in the Papal States on 5 April and ordered the citizens of Perugia to elect him their podestà.

Gregory excommunicated Frederick II on 29 September 1227, accusing him of breaking his oath to lead a crusade to the Holy Land; the emperor had dispatched two fleets to Syria, but a plague forced them to return. His wife Isabella died after giving birth to a son, Conrad, in May 1228. Frederick continued to consider himself king of Jerusalem, in accordance with the precedent set by John during Isabella's minority.

The imperial army under the command of Rainald of Urslingen invaded the Papal States in October 1228, beginning the so-called War of the Keys. Although John defeated the invaders in a series of battles, it took a counter-invasion by another papal army in southern Italy to drive Rainald back to Sulmona. John laid a siege before returning to Perugia in early 1229 to conclude negotiations with envoys of the Latin Empire of Constantinople, who were offering him the imperial crown.

== Emperor of Constantinople ==
=== Election ===
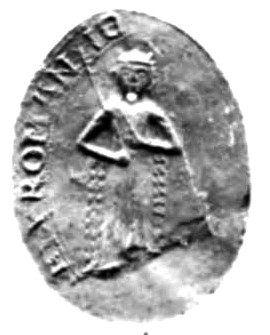
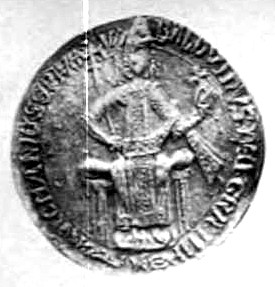
Seals of John's second daughter, Latin Empress Marie, and his son-in-law and co-ruler, Emperor Baldwin II

The Latin emperor of Constantinople, Robert I, died in January 1228. His brother Baldwin II succeeded him, but a regent was needed to rule the Latin Empire since Baldwin was ten years old. Ivan Asen II of Bulgaria was willing to accept the regency, but the barons of the Latin Empire suspected that he wanted to unite the Latin Empire with Bulgaria. They offered the imperial crown instead to John, an ally of the Holy See.

After months of negotiation, John and the envoys from the Latin Empire signed a treaty in Perugia which Gregory IX confirmed on 9 April 1229. John was elected emperor of the Latin Empire for life as senior co-ruler with Baldwin II, who married John's daughter Marie. The treaty also prescribed that although Baldwin would rule the Latin lands in Asia Minor when he was 20 years old, he would become sole emperor only after John's death. John stipulated that his sons would inherit Epirus and Macedonia, but the two regions still belonged to the emperor of Thessalonica, Theodore Doukas.

After signing the treaty, John returned to Sulmona. According to the contemporary Matthew Paris, he allowed his soldiers to plunder nearby monasteries to obtain money. John lifted the siege of Sulmona in early 1229 to join Cardinal Pelagius, who launched a campaign against Capua. Frederick II (who had crowned himself king of Jerusalem in the Church of the Holy Sepulchre) returned to Italy, forcing the papal troops to withdraw.

John went to France to recruit warriors to accompany him to Constantinople. Gregory IX did not proclaim John's expedition to the Latin Empire a crusade but promised papal privileges granted to crusaders to those who joined him. During his stay in France, John was again an intermediary between local potentates and signed a peace treaty between Louis IX of France and Hugh X of Lusignan. He returned to Italy in late 1230. John's envoys signed a treaty with Jacopo Tiepolo, the doge of Venice, who agreed to transport him and his retinue of 500 knights and 5,000 commoners to Constantinople in return for John's confirmation of Venetian possessions and privileges in the Latin Empire. Shortly after John left for Constantinople in August, Gregory IX acknowledged Frederick II's claim to the Kingdom of Jerusalem.

=== Rule ===
John was crowned emperor in Hagia Sophia in autumn 1231; by then, his territory was limited to Constantinople and its vicinity. The Venetians urged him to wage war against the emperor of Nicaea, John III Vatatzes, who supported a rebellion against their rule in Crete. According to Philippe Mouskes' Rhymed Chronicle, John could make "neither war nor peace"; because he did not invade the Empire of Nicaea, most French knights who accompanied him to Constantinople returned home after his coronation. To strengthen the Latin Empire's financial position, Geoffrey II of Achaea (John's most powerful vassal) gave him an annual subsidy of 30,000 hyperpyra after his coronation.

Taking advantage of John III Vatatzes' invasion of Rhodes, John launched a military expedition across the Bosphorus against the Empire of Nicaea in 1233. His three-to-four-month campaign "achieved little, or nothing"; the Latins only seized Pegai, now Biga in Turkey. With John's approval, two Franciscan and two Dominican friars wanted to mediate a truce between the Latin Empire and Nicaea in 1234 but it was never signed. In a letter describing their negotiations, the friars described John as a "pauper" abandoned by his mercenaries.

John III Vatatzes and Ivan Asen II concluded a treaty dividing the Latin Empire in early 1235. Vatatzes soon seized the last outposts of the empire in Asia Minor and Gallipoli, and Asen occupied the Latin territories in Thrace. They besieged Constantinople in an effort to persuade the defenders to gather in one place, enabling an invasion elsewhere. Although the besiegers outnumbered the defenders, John repelled all attacks on the town's walls. Mouskes compared him to Hector, Roland, Ogier the Dane and Judas Maccabeus in his Rhymed Chronicle, emphasizing his bravery.

A Venetian fleet forced Vatatzes' naval forces to withdraw, but after the Venetians departed for home the Greeks and Bulgarians besieged Constantinople again in November 1235. John sent letters to European monarchs and the pope, pleading for assistance. Since the survival of the Latin Empire was in jeopardy, Gregory IX urged the crusaders to defend Constantinople instead of the Holy Land. A combined naval force from Venice, Genoa, Pisa and Geoffrey II of Achaea broke through the blockade. Asen abandoned his alliance with Vatatzes, who was forced to lift the siege in 1236.

=== Death ===
According to three 13th-century authors (Matthew Paris, Salimbene di Adam and Bernard of Besse), John became a Franciscan friar before his death. They agree that John's declining health contributed to his conversion, but Bernard also described a recurring vision of an old man urging the emperor to join the Franciscans. Most 13th-century sources suggest that John died between 19 and 23 March 1237, the only Latin emperor to die in Constantinople.

According to the Tales of the Minstrel of Reims, he was buried in Hagia Sophia. Perry wrote that John, who died as a Franciscan friar, may have been buried in the Franciscan church dedicated to Saint Francis of Assisi which was built in Galata during his reign. In a third theory, proposed by Giuseppe Gerola, a tomb decorated with the Latin Empire coat of arms in Assisi's Lower Basilica may have been built for John by Walter VI, count of Brienne.

== Family ==
John's first wife, Queen Maria of Jerusalem (born 1191), was the only child of Isabella I of Jerusalem and her second husband, Conrad of Montferrat. Maria inherited Jerusalem from her mother in 1205. John and Maria's only child, Isabella (also known as Yolanda), was born in late 1212.

Stephanie of Armenia became John's second wife in 1214. She was the only daughter of Leo II of Armenia and his first wife, Isabelle (niece of Sibylle, the third wife of Bohemond III of Antioch). Stephanie gave birth to a son in 1220, but she and her son died that year.

John married his third wife, Berengaria of León, in 1224; she was born around 1204 to Alfonso IX of León and Berengaria of Castile. John and Berengaria's first child, Marie, was born in 1224. Their first son, Alphonse, was born during the late 1220s. He acquired the County of Eu with his marriage. John's second son, Louis, was born around 1230, and his third son, John, was born in the early 1230s. Berengaria's cousin Louis IX of France appointed Alphonse as his grand chamberlain and the younger John as his grand butler.

== Sources ==
=== Primary sources ===
- George Akropolites: The History (Translated with an Introduction and Commentary by Ruth Macrides) (2007). Oxford University Press. ISBN 978-0-19-921067-1.

=== Secondary sources ===
- Bianchini, Janna (2012). The Queen's Hand: Power and Authority in the Reign of Berenguela of Castile. University of Pennsylvania Press. ISBN 978-0-8122-4433-5.
- Buckley, James Michael (April 1957). "The Problematical Octogenarianism of John of Brienne". Speculum. 32 (2). The University of Chicago Press: 315–322. doi:10.2307/2849122. JSTOR 2849122. S2CID 164094491.
- Lock, Peter (1995). The Franks in the Aegean, 1204–1500. Longman. ISBN 0-582-05140-1.
- Perry, Guy (2013). John of Brienne: King of Jerusalem, Emperor of Constantinople, c. 1175–1237. Cambridge University Press. ISBN 978-1-107-04310-7.
- Runciman, Steven (1989). A History of the Crusades, Volume III: The Kingdom of Acre and the Later Crusades. Cambridge University Press. ISBN 0-521-06163-6.
- Treadgold, Warren (1997). A History of the Byzantine State and Society. Stanford, California: Stanford University Press. ISBN 0-8047-2630-2.
- Van Cleve, Thomas C. (1969) [1962]. "The Fifth Crusade; The Crusade of Frederick II". In Setton, Kenneth M.; Wolff, Robert Lee; Hazard, Harry W. (eds.). A History of the Crusades, Volume II: The Later Crusades, 1189–1311. Vol. 2 (Second ed.). Madison, Milwaukee, and London: University of Wisconsin Press. pp. 377–462. ISBN 0-299-04844-6.

John of Brienne House of Brienne Born: c. 1170 Died: 19–23 March 1237
Regnal titles
Preceded by Walter III	Count of Brienne; 1205/06–1221	Succeeded by Walter IV
Preceded by Maria	King of Jerusalem; 1210–1225; With: Maria and Isabella II	Succeeded by Isabella II and Frederick
Preceded by Baldwin II	Latin Emperor; 1229–1237; With: Baldwin II	Succeeded by Baldwin II
