= Maria of Montferrat =

Queen of Jerusalem (r. 1205–1212)

Maria
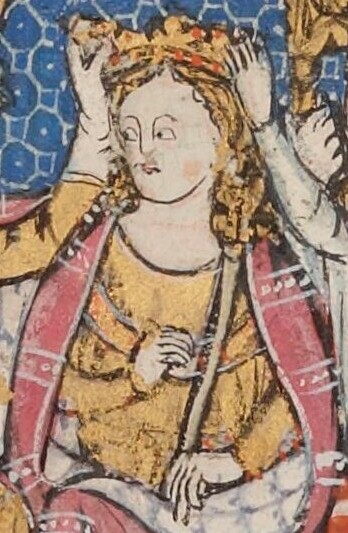
- Detail of a 14th-century miniature

Queen of Jerusalem
- Reign: 5 April 1205 – 1212
- Coronation: 3 October 1210, Tyre
- Predecessor: Isabella I
- Successor: Isabella II
- Co-ruler: John of Brienne (1210–1212)
- Regent: John of Ibelin (1205–1210)
- Born: 1192; Tyre, Kingdom of Jerusalem
- Died: Late 1212 (aged 19–20)
- Spouse: John of Brienne (m. 1210)
- Issue: Isabella II
- House: Aleramici
- Father: Conrad of Montferrat
- Mother: Isabella I of Jerusalem

Maria of Montferrat (French: Marie; 1192–1212), known as la Marquise, was the queen of Jerusalem who reigned from 1205 until 1212. She was the eldest daughter of Queen Isabella I and was born posthumously to Isabella's second husband, Marquis Conrad of Montferrat. She succeeded her mother as a minor under the regency of her half-uncle John of Ibelin. A search for a husband who would rule in her name began immediately, but an initial attempt to arrange a marriage with King Peter II of Aragon failed. In 1210, Maria married John of Brienne, who had been selected for her, and was crowned alongside him. John of Brienne took over the government from John of Ibelin and Maria consented to his acts as king. She died shortly after giving birth to her only child, Isabella II, who succeeded her as queen under King John's guardianship.

== Childhood ==
Maria was the daughter of Isabella I of Jerusalem and her second husband, Marquis Conrad of Montferrat. She was known as la Marquise in reference to her father's title. Maria's paternal family, the Aleramici of Montferrat, were familiar with the Latin East: Conrad's brother William had been married to Isabella's half-sister Sibylla and was the father of the child king Baldwin V (r. 1183–1186).

Conrad was assassinated on 28 April 1192. Isabella was pregnant with Maria at the time. Conrad's death left the Kingdom of Jerusalem–by then a rump state consisting of a thin coastal strip without the city of Jerusalem–lacking a male ruler. Count Henry II of Champagne was chosen as the new ruler and married the pregnant Isabella within a week of Conrad's death in order to gain legitimacy. The contemporary Muslim historian Imad ad-Din al-Isfahani was shocked: when he asked a courtier to whom the paternity would be awarded, he was told, "It will be the queen's child!" Christians, on the other hand, questioned whether Isabella's first marriage, to Humphrey IV of Toron, had been lawfully dissolved; since he was still alive, doubts arose over the validity of her later marriages to Conrad and Henry and over the legitimacy of their children. Henry was concerned that Conrad's child might be male and heir to the kingdom, but did not regard the birth of a stepdaughter as a problem. Isabella gave birth to Maria in 1192 in Tyre. She was named after Isabella's Byzantine mother, the dowager queen Maria Komnene.

Maria's mother had three daughters with Henry: Alice, Philippa, and Margaret (who died in childhood). Henry fell from a window to his death on 10 September 1197. Isabella promptly married King Aimery of Cyprus. Aimery and Isabella were crowned king and queen of Jerusalem in 1198. They had three children: Sibylla, Melisende, and Amalric. Isabella's older daughters were engaged to marry their Cypriot stepbrothers–Guy, John, and Hugh–but Guy and John died young.

Maria's close family, with marriages (dashed) in sequence

Agnes of Courtenay	(1) Amalric of Jerusalem	Maria Komnene	(2) Balian of Ibelin
William V of Montferrat	John of Ibelin	Philip of Ibelin
(1) Humphrey IV of Toron	(4) Aimery of Cyprus
Sibylla of Jerusalem	William of Montferrat	Boniface I of Montferrat	(2) Conrad of Montferrat	Isabella I of Jerusalem	(3) Henry II of Champagne
Baldwin V of Jerusalem	Maria of Montferrat	Alice of Champagne	Philippa of Champagne	Sibylla of Cyprus	Melisende of Cyprus

== Reign ==
=== Regency ===
Maria's half-brother Amalric stood to inherit their mother's kingdom, but he and his father, King Aimery, died in 1205. Shortly after Queen Isabella I died too, leaving five daughters. Maria, the eldest, succeeded her and the second eldest, Alice, became Maria's heir presumptive. The barons of the kingdom decided that Isabella's maternal half-brother John of Ibelin should rule the kingdom as regent in Maria's name. This was in accordance with Isabella's wish and the law of the kingdom that the regency be awarded to the closest relation, male or female, on the mother's side if the claim to the throne came from the mother. John of Ibelin ruled peacefully on Maria's behalf for three years. Throughout this period she formally gave her consent to much of what the government did in her name, but–like her mother before her coronation–did not yet assume the title of queen and was titled simply "the honourable lady of the kingdom".

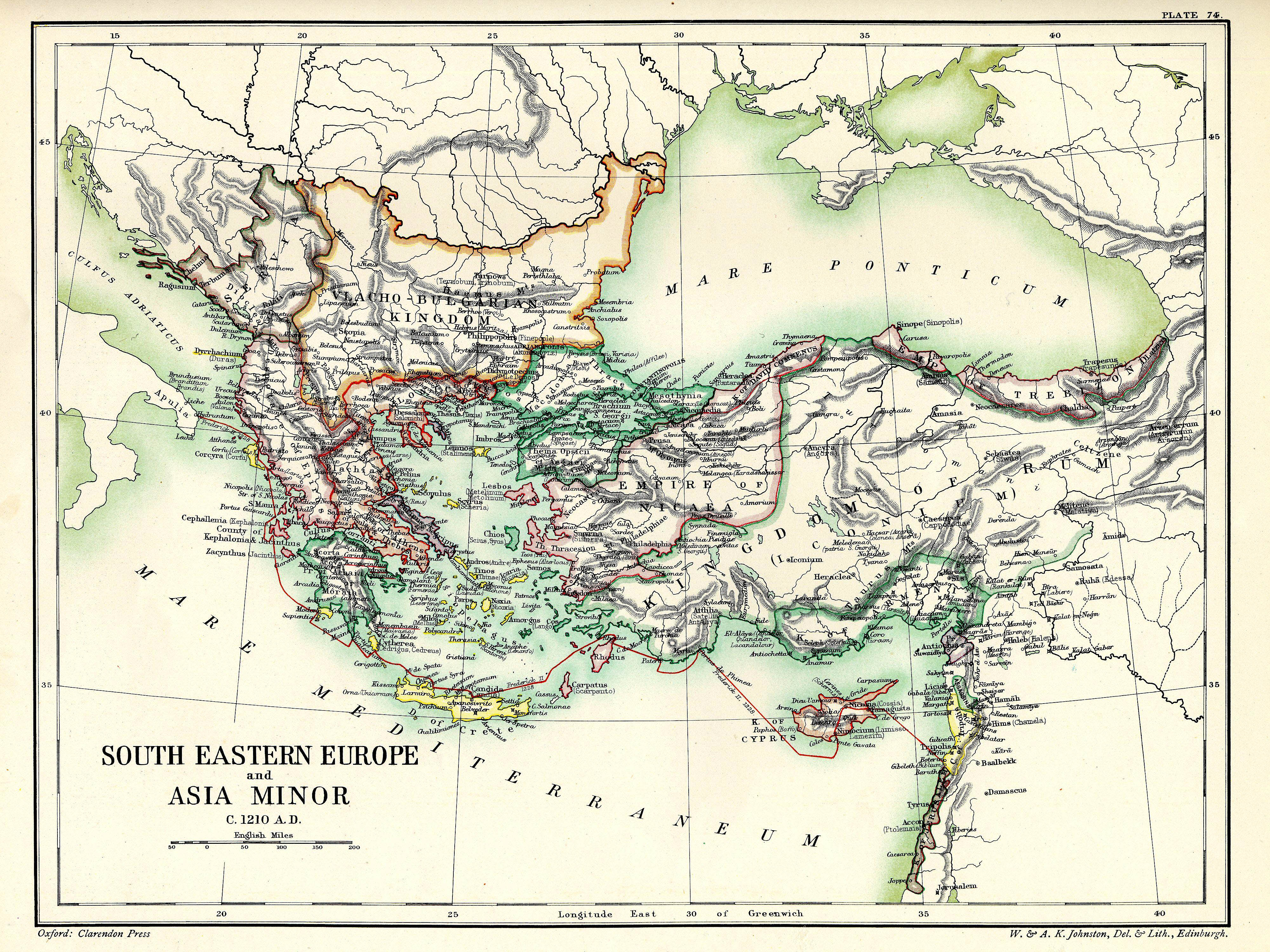
While Maria and her maternal family reigned in the Levant, her paternal family set up a kingdom in the Balkans.

A husband was sought for Maria already from 1205. Her paternal family, the Aleramici, remained indifferent both to the kingdom's affairs and to the question of her marriage; they were preoccupied with the Kingdom of Thessalonica, which her uncle Boniface had established recently in the Fourth Crusade. In 1206, her uncle John of Ibelin and her grandmother Queen Maria Komnene decided that the best match would be King Peter II of Aragon, an ambitious ruler with an interest in the Holy Land. Their marriage would bring a valuable international connection to the kingdom. Peter was already married, however, and needed an annulment. A marriage agreement was drawn up in the Kingdom of Jerusalem and was witnessed by the kingdom's elite. It provided that Maria would marry Peter if he brought suitable military aid by 1 November 1207. Pope Innocent III refused to be rushed into deciding on Peter's annulment, however, and the planned marriage with Maria could not come to pass.

According to one continuator of William of Tyre, an embassy led by Florent, bishop of Acre, and Aymar, lord of Caesarea, visited King Philip II of France in 1208 and asked him to find a capable candidate. The task proved difficult, and only in 1210, the king declared the search successful: John of Brienne had accepted. According to another continuator, an unnamed knight proposed John as king at an assembly in the Kingdom of Jerusalem and the attendees decided to approach him. Because the counts of Brienne were vassals of the counts of Champagne, John was of a much lower status than Maria. The historians Alan V. Murray and Guy Perry believe that John was championed by the countess of Champagne, Blanche of Navarre, who was trying to prevent Maria's half-sisters Alice and Philippa from laying claim to Champagne.

=== Queenship ===
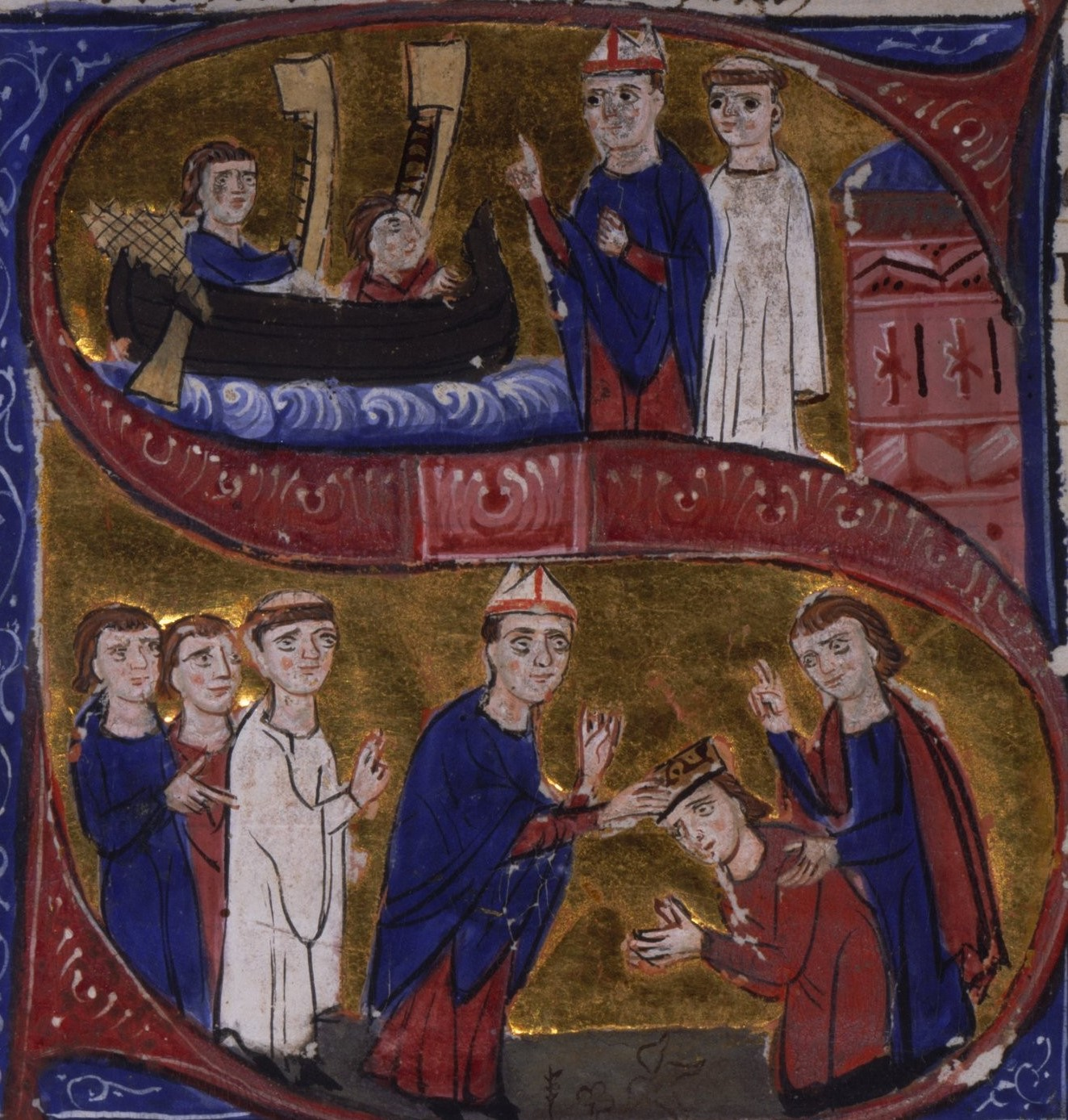
John of Brienne married Maria the day after his arrival and was crowned soon after.

John of Brienne arrived in Acre, then the capital of the kingdom, on 13 September 1210. The Latin patriarch of Jerusalem, Albert of Vercelli, solemnized Maria and John's marriage the next day and crowned them on 3 October in the Cathedral of the Holy Cross in Tyre, the most senior church remaining in Christian hands. The Ayyubid prince Al-Mu'azzam Isa, who ruled Damascus, took the opportunity to attack Acre at the time of the coronation, but its garrison defended it.

As a jure uxoris king, John was to reign with his wife, but effectively rule in her name. During their joint reign, Maria's consent was noted in most of John's acts. Like the immediately preceding queens regnant of Jerusalem–her mother Isabella I and aunt Sibylla–Maria showed little inclination toward political activity. King John's relationship with Queen Maria's uncles John and Philip of Ibelin soured soon after the coronation, though no open conflict arose during Maria's lifetime.

== Death and aftermath ==
Maria died shortly after giving birth to her only child, a daughter called Isabella II, in late 1212. Isabella inherited Maria's kingdom, while John of Brienne continued to rule it on the infant's behalf despite the Ibelins' opposition. Maria's line became extinct in 1268 with the death of her great-grandson Conrad III, and the kingdom passed to the descendants of her half-sister Alice. Like Isabella I and Isabella II, Maria is largely neglected in the historiography of the kings and queens of Jerusalem.

Maria of Montferrat Aleramici dynasty Born: summer 1192 Died: c. 1212
Regnal titles
Preceded by Isabella I	Queen of Jerusalem; 1205–1212 with John (1210-1212)	Succeeded by Isabella II
