= Isabella I of Jerusalem =

Queen of Jerusalem (r. 1190/1192–1205)

Isabella I
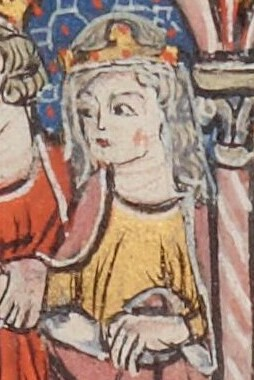

Queen of Jerusalem
- Reign: 1190/1192 – 1205
- Coronation: January 1198
- Predecessors: Sibylla and Guy
- Successor: Maria
- Co-rulers: Conrad (1190–1192); Henry (1192–1197); Aimery (1198–1205)
- Contender: Guy (1190–1192)

Queen consort of Cyprus
- Tenure: 1198–1205
- Born: c. 1172
- Died: mid-1205 (aged 32–33)
- Spouses: Humphrey IV, Lord of Toron (m. 1183; ann. 1190) Conrad, Marquis of Montferrat (m. 1190; died 1192) Henry II, Count of Champagne (m. 1192; died 1197) Aimery, King of Cyprus (m. 1197; died 1205)
- Issue more...: Maria, Queen of Jerusalem; Alice, Queen of Cyprus; Philippa, Lady of Ramerupt; Sibylla, Queen of Armenia; Melisende, Princess of Antioch
- House: Anjou
- Father: Amalric, King of Jerusalem
- Mother: Maria Komnene

Isabella I (Old French: Ysabel; c. 1172 – 1205) was the queen of Jerusalem who reigned from the early 1190s to her death. She received the homage of her vassals as the rightful heir to the throne after the death of her half-sister Queen Sibylla in 1190, but Sibylla's widower, Guy of Lusignan, held onto the kingdom until 1192. Isabella became queen upon her coronation in 1198. Having little political ambition, she passed the government on to three successive husbands, Conrad of Montferrat, Henry II of Champagne, and Aimery of Lusignan, all of whom included her in the issuing of their charters. Isabella's co-reign with Aimery saw the compilation of the Livre au roi, a law treatise establishing the rights and obligations of queens regnant of Jerusalem.

Isabella was the daughter of King Amalric and his second wife, Maria Komnene. After Amalric's death in 1174, Queen Maria married Balian of Ibelin. The marriage of Amalric's elder daughter, Sibylla, to the controversial Guy of Lusignan divided the nobility in two camps, with Isabella's stepfamily opposing Guy. Isabella's half-brother King Baldwin IV arranged for her to marry the lord Humphrey IV of Toron, whose family supported Guy and opposed the Ibelins. Baldwin IV suffered from leprosy and could not sire an heir; he named Sibylla's son, Baldwin V, as his successor. The High Court stipulated that a committee of Western European rulers was entitled to decide whether Sibylla or Isabella should inherit the throne if Baldwin V died. When Baldwin V died in 1186, Sibylla seized the throne before the committee could choose. Guy's opponents wished to install Isabella as anti-queen, but her husband, Humphrey, recognized Sibylla and Guy as rulers.

In 1190, after Queen Sibylla died in the midst of the Third Crusade, Isabella's mother and stepfather forced her to leave Humphrey so that she could marry Marquis Conrad of Montferrat and claim the throne against Guy. The crusading Kings Richard I of England and Philip II of France arbitrated and declared that Guy should retain the kingship for his lifetime and be succeeded by Isabella and Conrad. Conrad was elected king when Guy left the kingdom in 1192, but was assassinated shortly after. The nobles selected Count Henry II of Champagne to succeed Conrad, and Isabella hastily married him. Her fourth marriage, celebrated shortly after Henry's accidental death in 1197, was to Guy's brother, King Aimery of Cyprus. Aimery died in 1205 and Isabella herself died a few months later, at which time her kingdom passed to Maria of Montferrat, the eldest of her five surviving daughters.

== Early life ==
=== Childhood ===
Born between November 1171 and September 1172, Isabella was the daughter of King Amalric and his second wife, the Byzantine-born Maria Komnene. Her parents' other child, a daughter who was probably older, died in infancy. Isabella had two older half-siblings, Sibylla and Baldwin, born from Amalric's first, annulled marriage with Agnes of Courtenay. Amalric died of dysentery on 11 July 1174. Noblemen and clergy convened to discuss the succession to the Kingdom of Jerusalem, a crusader state surrounded by hostile Muslim powers. There were signs that Baldwin, the king's only son, might develop leprosy, but the claims of Sibylla, an unmarried girl, and Isabella, aged only two, were not viable. The assembly thus settled on Baldwin IV. Maria then retired with Isabella to the town of Nablus, which she had received from Amalric as her dower.

Soon after his accession, it became obvious that Baldwin suffered from lepromatous leprosy. To secure the succession to the ailing king, his sister, Sibylla, was given in marriage to William of Montferrat in November 1176, but William died in June 1177. Sibylla's cousin Count Philip I of Flanders arrived in the kingdom in August and proposed that Sibylla and Isabella should marry the brothers Robert and William of Bethune, respectively. The High Court of Jerusalem refused both proposals.

Isabella's mother, Queen Maria, married Balian of Ibelin in late 1177. His brother Baldwin of Ibelin wanted to marry Sibylla, but King Baldwin chose another candidate, Guy of Lusignan. Sibylla and Guy's marriage in 1180 caused a rift in the kingdom. Guy was supported by his mother-in-law, Agnes; her brother, Joscelin; and Raynald of Châtillon, the lord of Transjordan. Their opponents included Isabella's mother and stepfather and Count Raymond III of Tripoli, who was a first cousin of King Amalric.

Isabella's kin and her relationship with the Courtenay party (blue rectangular) and their opponents (red rounded)

Baldwin II of Jerusalem | Morphia of Melitene
Eremburga of Maine | Fulk V of Anjou | Melisende of Jerusalem | Alice of Jerusalem | Hodierna of Jerusalem
Sibylla of Anjou | Baldwin III of Jerusalem | Agnes of Courtenay | Amalric of Jerusalem | Maria Komnene | Balian of Ibelin | Stephanie of Milly | Raynald of Châtillon | Constance of Antioch | Raymond III of Tripoli
Philip I of Flanders | William of Montferrat | Sibylla of Jerusalem | Guy of Lusignan | Baldwin IV of Jerusalem | **Isabella I of Jerusalem** | Humphrey IV of Toron | Bohemond III of Antioch
Baldwin V of Jerusalem

=== First betrothal and wedding ===
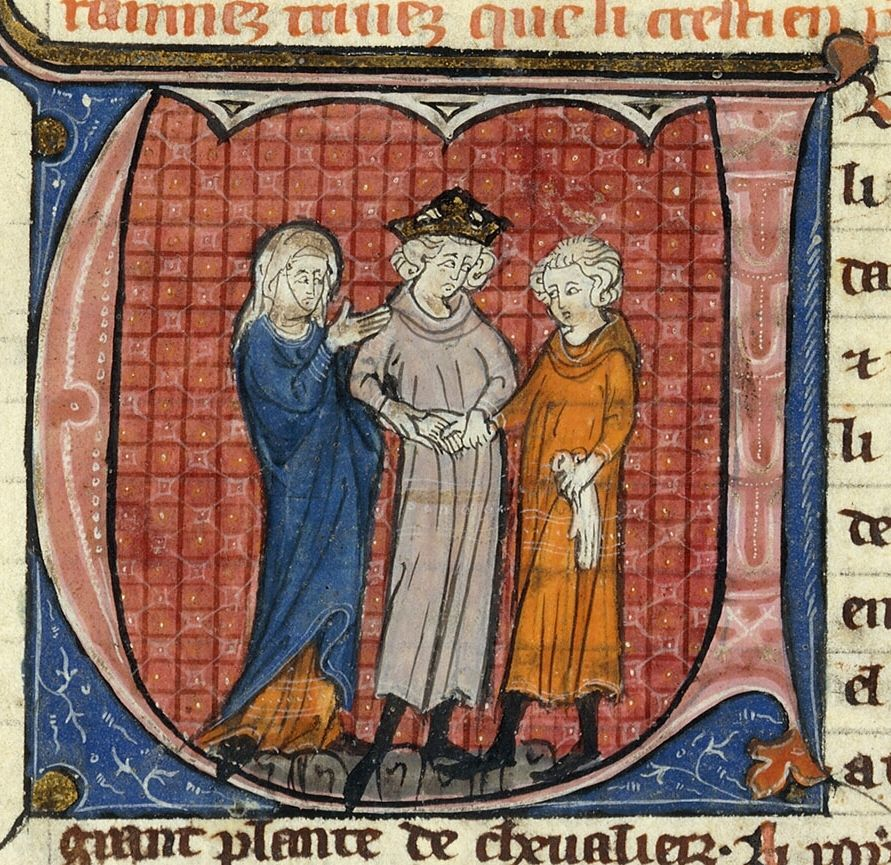
Isabella was eight when her half-brother King Baldwin IV betrothed her to Humphrey.

King Baldwin solemnly betrothed the eight-year-old Isabella to Raynald of Châtillon's fifteen-year-old stepson, Humphrey IV of Toron, in Jerusalem in October 1180. Archbishop William of Tyre drew up the marriage contract, according to which Humphrey ceded his fiefs of Toron, Chastelneuf, and the right to Banias to Baldwin. Still, the couple were not married immediately because Isabella had not yet reached the canonical age of twelve. Baldwin probably wished that the legality of the marriage be beyond doubt. The match was likely the idea of the king's mother, Agnes, who received Humphrey's lands in return. The historian Steven Runciman interpreted this betrothal as an attempt to heal the division between the two factions, while his colleague Bernard Hamilton argues that–on the contrary–it was meant to prevent the Ibelins from choosing Isabella's husband if Baldwin should die. After the betrothal to Humphrey, Isabella was sent to Kerak Castle to live with Humphrey's mother, Stephanie of Milly. Stephanie forbade her from visiting her mother in Nablus, effectively isolating her from any potential conspirators who might attempt to place her on the throne.

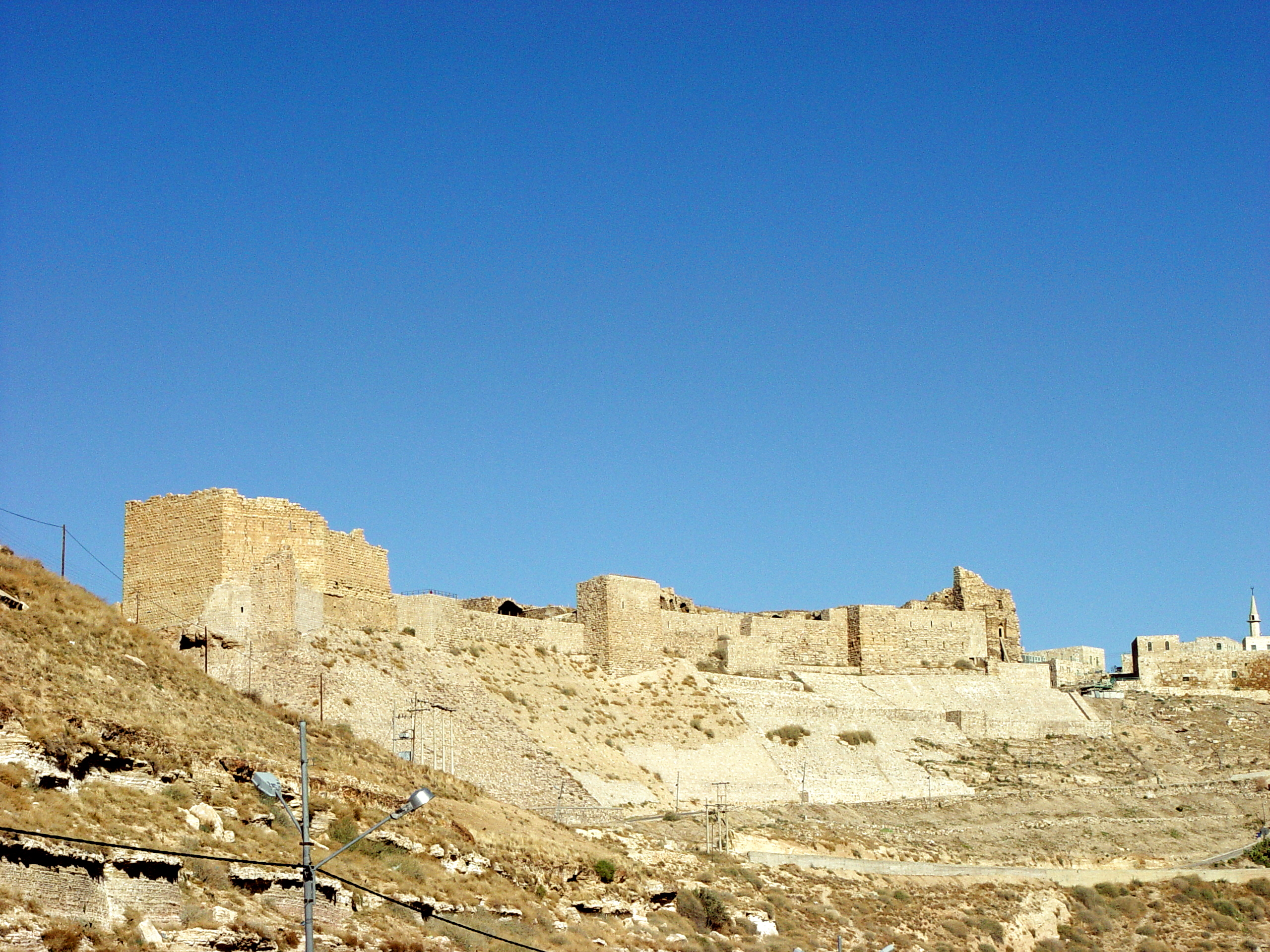
Isabella was in danger of being captured during her wedding celebrations at the Kerak Castle.

The religious marriage of Isabella and Humphrey was scheduled for late 1183, and professional entertainers flocked to Kerak Castle from around the region. Saladin, the Ayyubid sultan of Egypt and Syria, probably heard about the festivities and decided to try to take valuable hostages. He set out from Damascus on 22 October and laid siege to Kerak. According to Ernoul's chronicle, Stephanie of Milly sent feast dishes to Saladin, who forbade his engineers from bombarding the tower in which Humphrey and Isabella were lodged. Ernoul was likely informed by Isabella's mother, Queen Maria.

Baldwin IV's relationship with Guy of Lusignan had worsened by then, and Guy had shown that he was unable to command the royal army. When the news of Isabella's predicament at Kerak reached Jerusalem, the king and his council decided that Guy was not fit to be king. Isabella and Humphrey's claim could not be entertained because they were in danger of becoming captives. Baldwin IV thus had Sibylla's son by her first marriage, Baldwin V, crowned as co-king on 20 November 1183. The ailing king may have named his nephew as co-ruler to avoid a succession dispute between his sisters' supporters. Guy's principal allies, Joscelin of Courtenay and Raynald of Châtillon, were not present at Baldwin V's coronation; Raynald was attending the wedding at Kerak, and Joscelin probably was too. After Baldwin IV led a relief army to Kerak, Saladin lifted the siege and retreated without a fight on 4 December.

=== Succession dispute ===
Baldwin IV died in early 1185, having appointed Raymond of Tripoli regent for Baldwin V. Raymond accepted the regency on the condition, approved by the High Court, that a committee consisting of the pope, the Holy Roman emperor and the kings of France and England would choose between Sibylla and Isabella if Baldwin V died before reaching the age of majority.

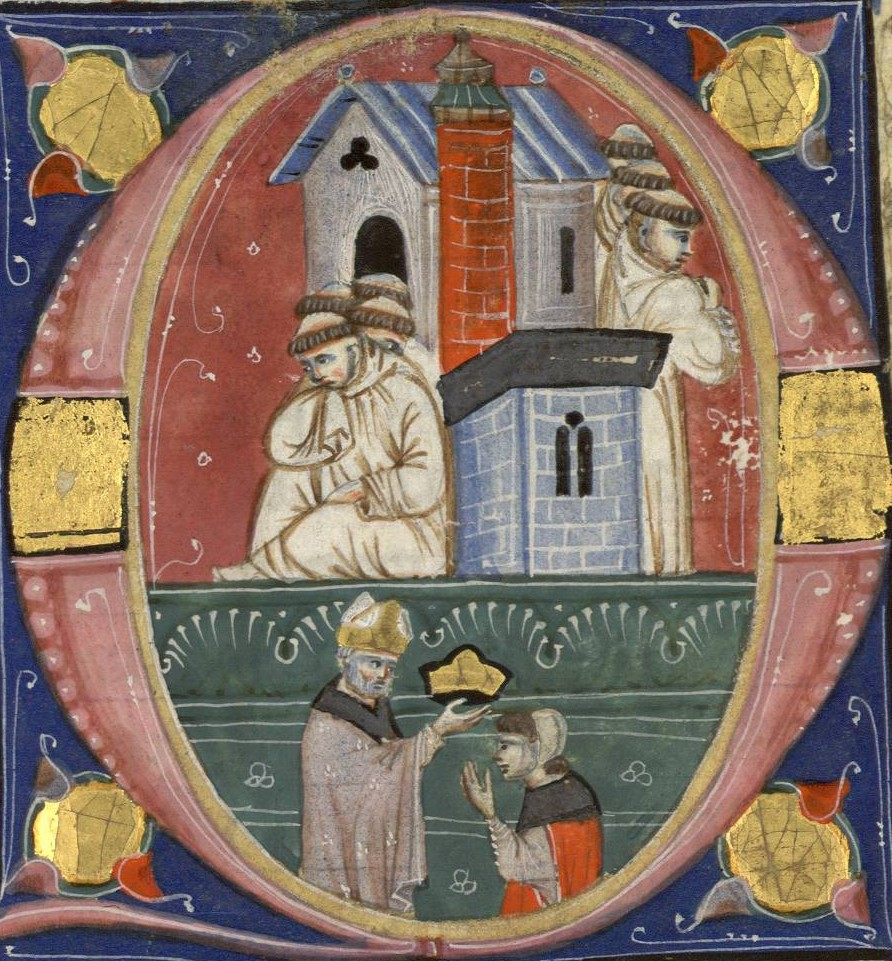
Isabella's family sent monks to forbid her half-sister's coronation.

In mid-1186, Baldwin V died too. Sibylla's uncle, Joscelin of Courtenay, persuaded Raymond of Tripoli and his allies to leave Jerusalem, and urged her supporters (including Raynald of Châtillon) to assemble in the town. Ignoring the 1185 ruling of the High Court, the noblemen and prelates who came to Jerusalem declared Sibylla the lawful heir to the throne. Raymond summoned the nobles to Nablus; those who attended his council probably included Isabella, her husband, and her stepfamily. They argued that Sibylla's legitimacy was dubious because her parents' marriage had been annulled and emphasized that Isabella was born after their father's coronation. The nobles at Nablus sent envoys to Jerusalem to forbid Sibylla's coronation, but it went ahead anyway; Sibylla then crowned Guy.

Upon hearing about Sibylla's coronation, Raymond suggested that Humphrey and Isabella be proclaimed king and queen in opposition. A civil war was averted when Humphrey, whose mother and stepfather supported Sibylla, fled from Nablus to Jerusalem and did homage to Sibylla and Guy. Before long, all of the barons except Raymond of Tripoli and Baldwin of Ibelin followed Humphrey's example and swore fealty to Sibylla and Guy.

=== Hattin and the Third Crusade ===
One would have called her one of the daughters of heaven: her face, brilliant with whiteness appeared to be of the morning; in the night of her deep black hair; she shone from her height. — Imad al-Din al-Isfahani, Conquête de la Syrie et de la Palestine par Saladin

Saladin imposed a crushing defeat on the united army of the Kingdom of Jerusalem in the Battle of Hattin on 4 July 1187. King Guy and Humphrey were among those captured on the battlefield. Before long, Saladin's troops seized most towns and fortresses of the kingdom, with Jerusalem capitulating on 2 October. Isabella and her mother-in-law went to plead with Saladin for Humphrey's release; with them came Queen Sibylla, who interceded on Guy's behalf. Imad al-Din al-Isfahani, a Muslim scholar in service to Saladin, recounts that Isabella was desperate to recover Humphrey.

Of all the Frankish towns, only Tyre held out against Saladin. Its defense was commanded by Conrad of Montferrat, the brother of Sibylla's first husband, William. At the urging of Pope Gregory VIII, European rulers started preparing for the Third Crusade–a new attempt to reconquer Palestine for Christendom. Conrad regarded himself as worthier of rule than Guy. He refused to allow Guy and Sibylla to enter Tyre in mid-1189. At that point, Guy assembled a meagre army in Antioch and laid siege to Acre. Isabella and Humphrey, together with her mother and stepfather, joined Guy and Sibylla at Acre. Sibylla died in late 1190 along with her and Guy's daughters. Guy's opponents argued that he had only been king by marriage and that his kingship thus lapsed with Sibylla's death.

The deaths of Sibylla and her daughters made Isabella the heir to the kingdom, but Guy insisted that he could not be dispossessed of it because he had been crowned king. Humphrey was Guy's friend and therefore refused to challenge him for kingship. Conrad of Montferrat held such ambitions, however, and approached Isabella's mother, Maria, with the proposal to marry Isabella. The dowager queen resented Humphrey for his role in preventing her from seeing Isabella and for refusing to champion Isabella's rights against Sibylla in 1186, and so she readily allied with Conrad. Realizing that Isabella's chances of supplanting Guy were low with Humphrey at her side, Maria and her party (including her husband, Balian; Reynald of Sidon; and Pagan II of Haifa) abducted Isabella from her tent next to Humphrey's. Isabella resisted her mother's plans; she loved Humphrey, who was described in the Itinerarium peregrinorum as "more like a woman than a man", with "a gentle manner and a stammer". Maria insisted that if she did not leave Humphrey, Isabella "could have neither honour nor her father's kingdom". According to the Itinerarium, Isabella's family sequestered her so that she could not be held responsible for any wrongdoing.

Maria testified before the papal legate, Ubaldo Lanfranchi, archbishop of Pisa, and Philip of Dreux, bishop of Beauvais, that Isabella was only eight when King Baldwin IV contracted her marriage against Isabella's wishes. The ailing Patriarch Heraclius of Jerusalem delegated the matter to Archbishop Baldwin of Canterbury. Baldwin refused to grant annulment, declared that Isabella and Conrad would commit adultery if they married, and excommunicated everyone involved in the affair. Archbishop Ubaldo was won over to Conrad's side by a promise of concessions to the Pisans, and Bishop Philip secured a general agreement for the annulment. Isabella then formally requested the kingdom and took homage of the barons, presumably at a session of the High Court. She used the short period before her marriage to Conrad—while she could still act independently—to tell her vassals that she did not wish that Humphrey lose both his wife and his inheritance; accordingly, she restored him to the lordships of Toron and Chastelneuf, which he had renounced at their marriage.

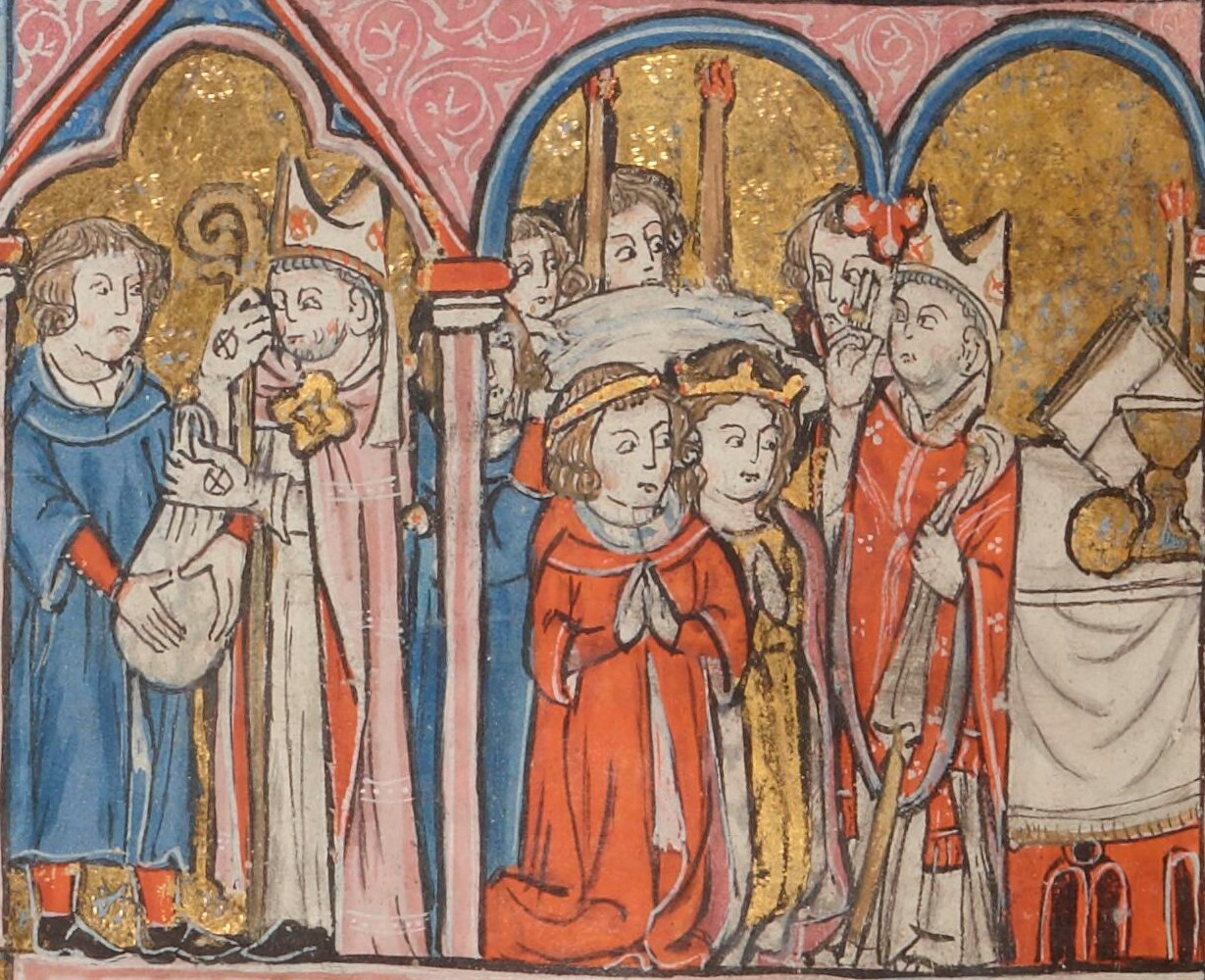
Isabella was forced to divorce the husband she loved to marry one who could win her throne.

On 24 November 1190, five days after the sudden death of Archbishop Baldwin, Philip officiated the wedding of Isabella and Conrad. Imad al-Din al-Isfahani records that Isabella was pregnant with Humphrey's child at the time, but no Christian source mentions this pregnancy; their union was childless. The Itinerarium condemns Isabella's actions, scorning women as too weak-willed to lead: "Indeed, the girl, easily schooled in wickedness, willingly takes up the foul doctrine of her advisers, and now does not blush to say that she was not abducted, but willingly followed the marquis." Conrad and Isabella took up residence in Tyre while Guy remained before Acre. They were not crowned; it may be that the patriarch refused to recognize their marriage or that the barons believed that the arriving European rulers could influence the outcome of the couple's dispute with Guy.

King Philip II of France, who arrived before Acre on 20 April 1191, stood with Conrad; so did the barons of the kingdom, the Knights Templar, and the Genoese. King Richard I of England joined the siege on 8 June; he, the Knights Hospitaller, and the Pisans lent their support to Guy. Guy asked the kings to adjudicate. Acre fell to the crusaders on 12 July. Conrad insisted that Isabella was the legitimate heir recognized by the High Court, but on 26 July he agreed to accept Richard and Philip's arbitration. Two days later, the kings of France and England announced a compromise: Guy would retain kingship for life, but could not pass it onto his children; after Guy's death, Isabella and Conrad would inherit the kingdom; a new county would be erected for Conrad, consisting of Tyre, Sidon, and Beirut; and the royal revenues would be shared between the rivals.

Familial relationships between Guy and his supporters (blue rectangular) and Isabella and her supporters (red rounded) with three of Isabella's successive husbands numbered and in bold

Gisela of Burgundy | Eremburga of Maine | Fulk V of Anjou | Melisende of Jerusalem
Adelaide of Maurienne | Geoffrey V of Anjou | William V of Montferrat
Agnes of Courtenay | Amalric of Jerusalem | Maria Komnene | Balian of Ibelin
Louis VII of France | Eleanor of Aquitaine | Henry II of England
Philip II of France | Marie of France | Richard I of England | (2); **Conrad of Montferrat** | William of Montferrat | Sibylla of Jerusalem | Guy of Lusignan | (4); **Aimery of Lusignan** | Isabella I of Jerusalem
(3); **Henry II of Champagne** | Baldwin V of Jerusalem

== Reign ==
=== Lady ===
King Philip II of France left for Europe soon after the arbitration of July 1191 and King Richard I of England became the sole supreme commander of the crusaders. By the time he decided to return to England in April 1192, Richard had realized that Guy of Lusignan would not be able to keep the throne of Jerusalem and accepted the barons' vote that Conrad of Montferrat be their king. Richard compensated Guy with the lordship of Cyprus and dispatched Count Henry II of Champagne–the nephew of both Richard and Philip–to inform Conrad about the barons' decision. On 20 April, Henry arrived at Tyre where it was decided that the coronation would be held within a few days. Henry then returned to Acre.

Isabella, who loved lingering in her bath, spent unusually much time there on 28 April, which kept her husband waiting for dinner. He decided to have dinner with Philip of Dreux, but Philip had already finished his meal by the time Conrad reached him. Conrad was on his way home when he was ambushed and stabbed in a narrow street by two men sent by the Assassins. On his deathbed, he ordered Isabella not to cede Tyre to anyone but Richard or the new king of Jerusalem. Duke Hugh III of Burgundy, the French king's lieutenant in Palestine, urged Isabella to deliver Tyre to him, but she resolutely refused and shut herself up in the fortress. Although she was the heir to the kingdom, all she possessed was Tyre.

The Third Crusade saw the Christians recover a narrow coastal strip for their kingdom.

On learning of Conrad's assassination, Henry of Champagne hurried back to Tyre, where the barons and citizens acclaimed him. Isabella, pregnant at the time with Conrad's child, proposed to marry Henry. Henry feared that she might deliver a son who would inherit the kingdom and was hesitant to accept, but the barons and the crusaders held that his rule would only be legitimate if he married Isabella. The barons and the citizens promised to Henry that his children would inherit the Kingdom of Jerusalem to persuade him. Isabella married Henry within days of being widowed and took up residence in Acre. (Note: According to Eracles, Isabella married Henry within four days of Conrad's death. In Ralph of Diceto's account, ten days had passed.) Imad ad-Din al-Isfahani condemned the European Christians' failure to respect the rights of a pregnant widow and saw in this a proof of their "licentiousness". When he asked a messenger who would be considered the child's father, he was told, "It's the princess's child."

The Third Crusade concluded in September 1192 with a stalemate: the kingdom recovered a coastal strip extending from Jaffa to Tyre. Isabella and Conrad's child proved to be a daughter, Maria. With Henry, Isabella had three more daughters: Alice, Margaret (who died as a child), and Philippa. Guy continued to claim kingship and contested Henry and Isabella's right to rule. His brother Aimery was constable of Jerusalem and count of Jaffa until Henry exiled him to Cyprus. Henry appointed Isabella's half-brother John of Ibelin as the new constable. When Guy died in 1194, Aimery became lord of Cyprus. Henry reconciled with Aimery ahead of the German-led Crusade of 1197 and agreed that his eldest surviving daughter should wed Aimery's eldest surviving son. As part of the settlement, Isabella and Henry promised that Jaffa would be restored to the Lusignans as their daughter's dowry. In September, Aimery was crowned king of Cyprus with German backing.

Though he was never crowned and never called himself king, Henry was the effective ruler of the reconstituted kingdom. He took Isabella with him when he travelled to the cities and castles under his control; the Itinerarium states that he "could not yet bear to be parted from her", but his hold on the kingdom was tenuous and he probably needed Isabella to be present to establish his authority. Isabella's consent is noted in almost all documents issued by Conrad and Henry; in these she is consistently referred to as domina ("lady") and King Amalric's daughter.

=== Queen ===
Henry fell to his death from the window of the royal palace in Acre on 10 September 1197. Isabella was too distraught to take charge, but had to marry again. Her barons could not agree on who the next ruler should be. Hugh of Saint-Omer proposed his brother Ralph, the seneschal; their family was one of the most distinguished in the kingdom, but they had lost their Principality of Galilee to the Muslims, and Ralph was neither sufficiently wealthy nor prestigious. Jaffa was captured by Muslims during the debate. The crusader Duke Henry I of Brabant, who had gone to defend Jaffa, returned to Acre and took up the government. Archbishop Conrad of Mainz and the German crusaders arrived from Cyprus on 20 September. Conrad suggested that the throne be offered to King Aimery of Cyprus; the archbishop held a great influence in the Church and in the Holy Roman Empire, and his suggestion was met with approval by everyone except Patriarch Aymar of Jerusalem. Aimery's wife, Eschiva of Ibelin, had recently died, and he was free to marry Isabella. The marriage was apparently negotiated by Archbishop Joscius of Tyre. The wedding, or at least a betrothal, took place in October. The patriarch withdrew his objections and crowned the couple in January 1198 in Acre. Only then did Isabella become queen.

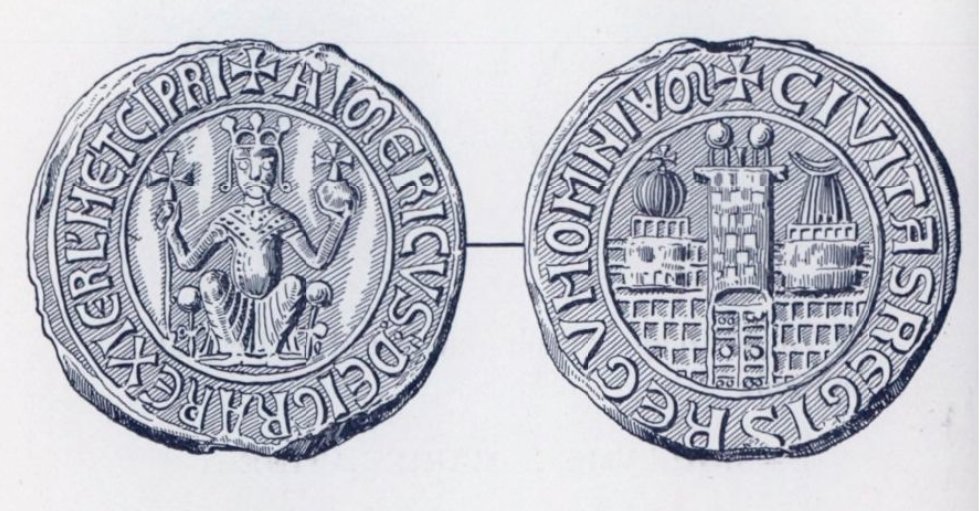
Isabella's fourth husband, Aimery of Lusignan, ruled his Kingdom of Cyprus separately from her Kingdom of Jerusalem.

King Aimery declined to unite the governments of Cyprus and Jerusalem and was slow to make any significant changes to Isabella's advisors. All surviving charters issued by Aimery refer to Isabella; three of them were jointly issued, the other three with Isabella's consent. Isabella is not known to have issued any charter on her own; it is thus not known how she titled herself, and no seal of hers survives either. She and Aimery sponsored the Livre au roi, a law book specifying the obligations of the king and queen and regulating the succession to the throne. The Livre au Roi presents king and queen side by side in enacting the law, placing them on equal footing; this suggests that Isabella had a larger political role in Jerusalem under Aimery, and that by the early thirteenth century the queen regnant was expected to rule in a closer partnership with her husband.

Queen Isabella and King Aimery had a son, Amalric, and two daughters, Sibylla and Melisende. Isabella's three older daughters were betrothed to the three sons Aimery had from his first marriage. Amalric stood to succeed Isabella on the throne of Jerusalem, but he died on 2 February 1205. Aimery died on 1 April after eating too much fish, and the throne of Cyprus passed to his son, Hugh I. Isabella took up the government of her kingdom, becoming its sole ruler. With the assent of the High Court, she named her half-brother John her bailli (lieutenant). A few months after Aimery's death–in mid-1205–Isabella herself died. She was survived by five children, all daughters–Maria of Montferrat, Alice and Philippa of Champagne, and Sibylla and Melisende of Lusignan–and was succeeded by the eldest, Maria. Maria was then aged about 13 and John of Ibelin became her regent; Isabella may have nominated him on her deathbed.

The historian Steven Runciman observes that, in contrast to the other women in her family, Isabella is an obscure figure. She was said to be beautiful, but no reports of her personality survive. Runciman and his colleague Bernard Hamilton agree that she had no political ambitions. Had she so wished, Runciman continues, "she could have been a power in the land, but she let herself be passed from husband to husband without consideration of her personal wishes." Runciman concludes that Isabella was "feckless and weak".

== Notes ==
Isabella I of Jerusalem House of Châteaudun Cadet branch of the Angevin dynasty Born: circa 1172 Died: 5 April 1205
Regnal titles
| Preceded by Sibylla; Guy | Queen regnant of Jerusalem; 1190/92–1205 with Conrad I (1192); Henry I (1192–1197); Aimery (1198–1205) | Succeeded by Maria |
Royal titles
| Preceded by Eschiva of Ibelin | Queen consort of Cyprus; 1198–1205 | Succeeded by Alice of Champagne |
