= William II of Agen =

Latin Patriarch of Jerusalem in 1262

Seal of Patriarch William

William II (French: Guillaume) was a French prelate of the Catholic Church who was successively the bishop of Agen (1245–1261) and patriarch of Jerusalem (1261–1270). He was an energetic and capable churchman who enjoyed the confidence of Popes Innocent IV and Urban IV and the respect of secular rulers. After a long and successful career in France, he was appointed to head the Church of Jerusalem during one of its most difficult times. In the Kingdom of Jerusalem, William exercised supreme authority, both spiritual and secular, and as papal legate he held sway over the Church throughout the Latin East. During his rule, the kingdom once again gained a resident king in the person of Hugh III of Cyprus, whom he had crowned king of Cyprus and supported in the bid for the throne of Jerusalem.

== Bishop of Agen ==
William came from Saintonge. He attended Pope Innocent IV during the First Council of Lyon in 1245 and was a chaplain to John Gaetano Orsini, then cardinal-deacon of San Nicola in Carcere and later pope. In 1247, Innocent made him bishop of Agen and personally consecrated him. After leaving the papal Curia, William quickly won Innocent IV's confidence. In 1248, the pope entrusted him with oversight of the Inquisition in Toulouse, a task deemed urgent due to delays in prosecutions that were seen as encouraging Catharism, and gave him sweeping powers.

During his 16-year-long tenure as bishop of Agen, William became an experienced ecclesiastical administrator. He devoted sustained effort to recovering tithes that had long been alienated to lay control. Rather than relying on ineffective conciliar decrees, he pursued individual negotiations, using carefully structured agreements in which lay holders relinquished their rights in exchange for monetary compensation, avoiding any appearance of simony. This large-scale restitution, made possible by prudent management of episcopal resources, marked one of his most notable achievements.

In 1251, William helped restore peace in Aquitaine between Simon de Montfort and rebellious Gascon barons, with Innocent IV endorsing his authority to interpret the settlement. From 1261, William played a central role in implementing Count Alphonse III of Toulouse's extraordinary levy, the fouage, intended to fund a crusade. Drawing on his skills as a negotiator, he advised Alphonse's clerks, guided the seneschal of Agenais, and managed local opposition. William demonstrated both firmness and flexibility, proposing to postpone payments to make the burden more acceptable, a plan the count approved out of respect for him. He personally contributed a substantial sum and oversaw accurate record-keeping of payments, ensuring accountability despite widespread resistance.

== Patriarch of Jerusalem ==
In August 1261, the then-Latin patriarch of Jerusalem, James Pantaleon, was elected pope and took the name Urban IV. On 2 December, he appointed William to succeed him as patriarch of Jerusalem. He also gave the Diocese of Acre to William to administer until the city of Jerusalem was reconquered from the Muslims. This solved the issue of the patriarch being a mere guest of the bishop of Acre, the richest prelate in the rump Kingdom of Jerusalem. Until he arrived, the sees of Jerusalem and Acre were administered in his name by Peter, bishop of Hebron, and Adam, archdeacon of Acre, but real power lay with Thomas of Lentini, bishop of Bethlehem, who was the papal legate. Shortly before William's arrival, Urban recalled Thomas to Europe so that William would be spared the humiliation of being outranked by a suffragan. As William's successor in Agen, Urban appointed William, hitherto bishop of Lydda.

In May 1263, William came to Rome to confer with Urban IV about the state of the Latin East. Because the Latin patriarch of Antioch, Opizzo Fieschi, whose patriarchate had been nearly entirely conquered by the Muslims, was preparing to leave Syria, Urban made William his legate with powers not just in the patriarchate of Jerusalem but also in that of Antioch and the kingdoms of Armenian Cilicia and Cyprus. As the sole representative of the pope in the Latin East, William was more powerful than any of the preceding patriarchs of Jerusalem. In his bull titled Exultavit cor nostrum, Urban tasked William to investigate the legitimacy of an alleged ambassador with the Mongol Empire, John the Hungarian. William landed in Acre, the capital of what remained of the Kingdom of Jerusalem, on 25 September.

William led the Church of Jerusalem through its most difficult period since the Battle of Hattin in 1187, but was fortunate to have Urban IV's full support. While the popes occasionally meddled in Jerusalem's church affairs, William was the ultimate political authority in the kingdom. The kings of Jerusalem had not resided in the kingdom since 1225, and William carried more weight than even the king's bailli. For example, when a Catalan knight broke out of an Egyptian prison in 1267 and reached Acre with news of an imminent Egyptian assault, he was taken directly to William instead of to the kingdom's bailli; and it was William, not the lay authorities, who informed King Theobald I of Navarre why Theobald's vassal Hugh of Brienne was unable to come claim his inheritance. In 1267, William sailed to Cyprus to visit the churches there in his capacity as papal legate. He was present when King Hugh II died on 5 December and it fell to him, rather than to the archbishop of Nicosia, to carry out the coronation of King Hugh III on Christmas at the Cathedral of Saint Sophia in Nicosia.

The Mamluks of Egypt conquered large portions of the kingdom in the mid-1260s, prompting a new crusade. The death of King Conrad III of Jerusalem in 1268 led to a succession dispute between King Hugh III of Cyprus and Maria of Antioch, both of whom claimed the throne of Jerusalem. William gave his support to Hugh and instructed the bishop of Lydda, John of Troyes, to perform Hugh's coronation as king of Jerusalem in 1269. Though the accession of a resident monarch reduced William's temporal authority, the kingdom needed a capable military leader to defend it from the Mamluks. Although William oversaw the restoration of effective monarchy in the kingdom, which he believed to be the best interest of the state, Acre had become entirely dependent on the Church during his pontificate. William died in Acre on 21 April 1270 before the crusade set out from Europe.

Catholic Church titles
Preceded by Peter of Reims	Bishop of Agen; 1245–1261	Succeeded by William III
Preceded by James Pantaleon	Patriarch of Jerusalem; 1261–1270	Succeeded by Thomas Agni of Lentini
