= Roman Catholic Diocese of Bethlehem =

Roman Catholic Diocese of Bethlehem may refer to the following ecclesiastical jurisdictions :

- Diocese of Bethlehem in the Holy Land, a former Latin crusader bishopric, now a Latin Catholic titular see
- Diocese of Bethléem à Clamecy, for the bishops of above Bethlehem in exile from the Holy land, with see in Clamecy, Burgundy (eastern France)
- Diocese of Bethlehem in South Africa
