= Diocese of Bethlehem =

Diocese of Bethlehem may refer to the following ecclesiastical jurisdictions :

Latin Catholic bishoprics

- Roman Catholic Diocese of Bethlehem in the Holy Land, a former Latin crusader bishopric, now a Latin Catholic titular see
- Roman Catholic Diocese of Bethléem à Clamecy, for the bishops of above Bethlehem in exile from the Holy land, with see in Clamecy, Burgundy (eastern France)
- Roman Catholic Diocese of Bethlehem in South Africa

Episcopal (Anglican) diocese

- Episcopal Diocese of Bethlehem, formerly known as the Diocese of Central Pennsylvania; in reunion with that diocese from 1 January 2026 as the Episcopal Diocese of the Susquehanna (USA)
