= John of Troyes =

Bishop of Lydda from 1264 to 1271

John of Troyes was a clergyman of the Latin Church who was the bishop of Lydda in the Kingdom of Jerusalem from 1264 until 1271.

Pope Urban IV appointed John to the see of Lydda after transferring the previous bishop, William, to the see of Agen. According to the Templar of Tyre, John deposited the body of an otherwise unknown saint, Cretienne, in Jaffa on his way to Acre. Shortly after, in 1268, Jaffa was conquered by the Egyptian Mamluks, who burned the saint's body. A charter shows that John was indeed in Acre in October 1267.

When King Hugh III of Cyprus and Maria of Antioch both claimed the Kingdom of Jerusalem in 1268, the Latin patriarch of Jerusalem, William II of Agen, instructed John to crown Hugh. Maria then approached John, but he scornfully dismissed her claim. John crowned Hugh in the Cathedral of the Holy Cross in Tyre on 24 September 1269. The ceremony was highly irregular; the date did not fall on any feast day or even a Sunday, and John was only authorized to perform it because the patriarch was unable to attend and the three metropolitan sees—the archbishoprics of Tyre, Nazareth, and Caesarea—were all vacant. Maria sent a clerk and a notary to interrupt the coronation; they lodged a protest on her behalf and then fled the cathedral. After being spurned, Maria went to Rome and, in early 1272, complained about John's crowning of Hugh to Pope Gregory IX. She argued that John had acted "according to his own pleasure" and that he had no right to perform the coronation.

The last document to mention John dates from June 1271. The next known bishop of Lydda is Geoffrey, who appears in a document dated June 1286.
