= John of Noyon =

French theologian and bishop-elect of Acre (c. 1160-1204)

John of Noyon (French: Jean; c. 1160–1204), sometimes called John Faicete, (Note: According to the historian Petrus Cornelis Boeren, John of Noyon has been confused with the knight Jean de Faicete, with whom he traveled to Rome.) was a French theologian and statesman. After joining the Fourth Crusade, he became bishop-elect of Acre and chancellor of Emperor Baldwin I of Constantinople.

== Career in France ==
John was probably born in the Diocese of Noyon in the Kingdom of France, around 1160. He studied theology at the University of Paris and obtained a master's degree around 1195. Around this time, he adapted the Sentences of Peter of Poitiers and wrote his own commentary on Decretum Gratiani.

In April or May 1201, Queen Ingeborg secretly engaged John and Daniel, dean of Saint-Quentin, to plead her case at a synod in Soissons, which King Philip Augustus had initiated to obtain an annulment of their marriage. They appeared at the synod unexpectedly, bypassing the counsel which the king had assigned to the queen and causing him to declare his willingness to reconcile with her. From 1201, he witnessed charters issued by Count Baldwin IX of Flanders.

== Fourth Crusade ==
In 1202, John joined the Fourth Crusade as one of its leading clerics. The crusade was meant to come to the aid of the Latins in Syria, but only a minority of crusaders traveled so far. John stayed with the bulk of the army, which sacked Zara, a Christian city, for which they were excommunicated by Pope Innocent III. John was sent to Rome as an envoy to request absolution for the army. These crusaders then went on to sack Constantinople in April 1204 instead. John was elected bishop of Acre, apparently at some point between February and May 1204. The election may have been arranged by Baldwin IX of Flanders. On 9 May, Baldwin was elected by an assembly of bishops to be the first Latin emperor of Constantinople, and John was one of the electors. John immediately became Baldwin's chancellor.

Like Peter, bishop of Bethlehem, John stayed with crusaders in Constantinople instead of making his way to his see. John died in Serres on 11 August 1204, never having reached Acre. The 13th-century chroniclers Geoffrey of Villehardouin and Gunther of Pairis held him and his talents in high regard.
