= Diocese of Lydda =

Roman Catholic titular see

Coordinates: 31°57′7″N 34°53′17″E

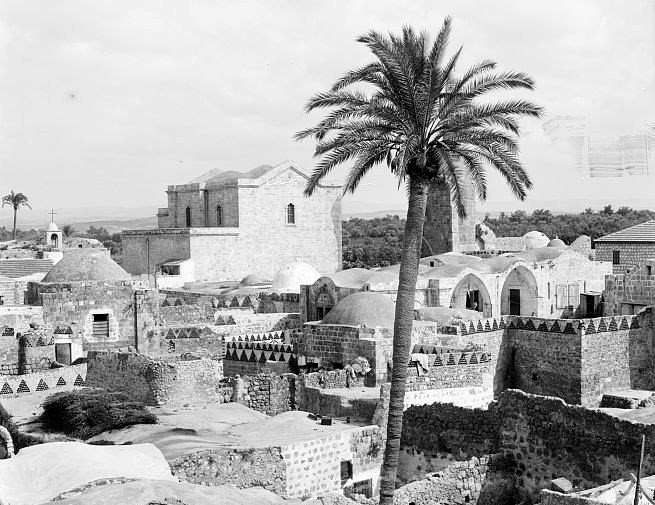
St Georges Church, Lod

Diocese of Lydda (Lod) is one of the oldest bishoprics of the early Christian Church in the Holy Land. Suppressed under Persian, it was revived during Arab-Muslim rule, and remains a Latin Catholic titular see.

== History ==
In early Christian times, Lydda was a prosperous Jewish town located on the intersection of the North – South and Egypt to Babylon roads.

According to the Bible, Lod was founded by Semed of the Israelite Tribe of Benjamin; Some of its inhabitants were led into Babylonian exile, part of them returned, but by mid second century, the king of Syria gave it to the Maccabees, who kept control until the arrival of Roman conqueror Pompei in Judea. Flavius Josephus confirms Julius Caesar gave it in 48 BC to the Hebrews, but Cassius sold the population in 44 BC, Mark Antony released them two years later. The city saw Roman civil wars and Hebrew revolts in the first century, was officially renamed Diospolis, but remained known as Lod or Lydda.

Christians established themselves there after Saint Peter preached there and cured the paralytic Eneas. A church was built when Saint Peter visited the city between 31–36AD. By 120 AD most of the inhabitants were Christian. The episcopal see was established by the first Byzantine emperor Constantin the Great, as suffragan of the Archdiocese of Caesarea in Palestina, in the sway of the original Patriarchate of Jerusalem. In December 415, the Council of Diospolis was held in the bishopric to try British monk Pelagius; he was acquitted but his heresy Pelagianism condemned. The earliest historically recorded bishop is Aëtius, a friend of Arius.

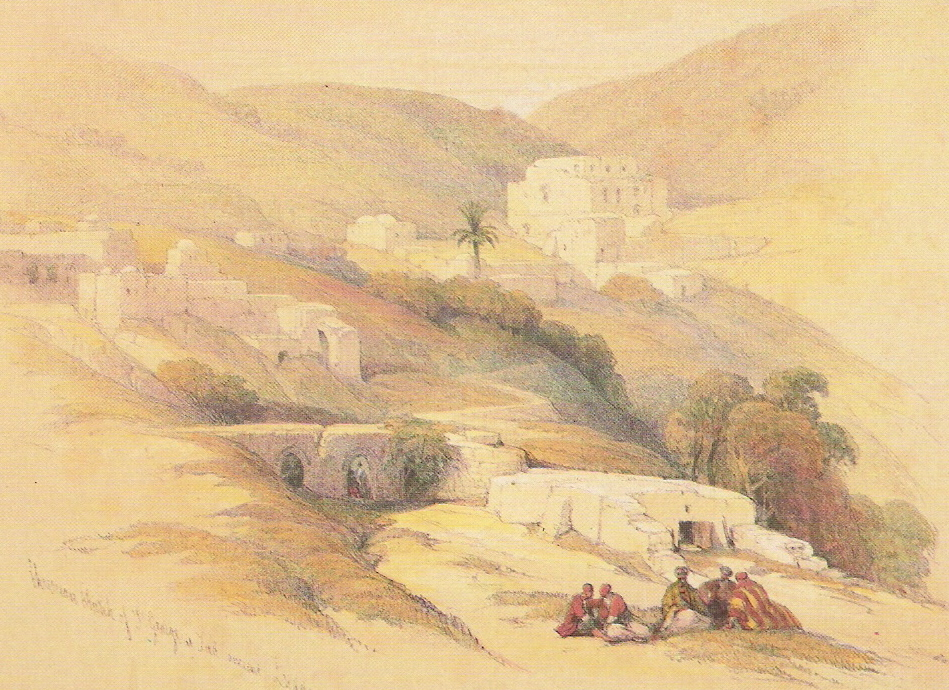
Lithograph of Lod by David Roberts, 1839

The city was renamed Georgiopolis after local martyr St George, patron saint of England, who was born Lod and buried on the site of the basilica of Georgius, first mentioned about 530 by pilgrim Theodosius.

It suffered gravely under pagan Persian border incursions and faded at the advent of Arab Muslims.

Byzantine Suffragan Bishops of Lydda/ Diopolis/ Georgiopolis

- (according to tradition) Zenas the Lawyer
- Aëtius, a friend of Arius (fl. 325 - death before 335)
- Dionysius (fl. 381 - death before 415)
- Photinus (fl. 449 - 451)
- Apollonius (fl. 518)
- Eustatius

== Latin Crusader bishopric ==
In 1099, during the triumphant First Crusade (1096–1099), Lydda and Arab neighbour town Ramla were assigned to Robert, a Norman known after his natal diocese Rouen (in Normandy, France, where conquering Vikings were christianized only a few generations). This briefly created the Roman Catholic Diocese of Lydda and Ramla. The crusaders seized Ramla without fight on 3 June 1099, because the Muslim garrison had left the town before their arrival. Located at the crossing of two roads, Ramla was a strategically important fortress. The nearby Lydda was the most important shrine of the warrior saint, Saint George. The crusaders held an assembly and decided to establish a bishopric in the town.

Robert was installed as virtual prince-bishop, wielding temporal feudal power as well as religious jurisdiction, obliged to supply a cavalry contingent to the Latin Kingdom of Jerusalem.

In 1110 civil jurisdiction over Ramla was split off as a separate Lordship of Ramla, vested in Baldwin.

Saint George's church was burned by Muslims in 1099, but rebuild larger, shifted to the northeast, in the 12th century by the Crusaders as Latin cathedral, but again destroyed by Saracens in 1191, in the fight against English crusader king Richard Lionheart, the patron saint of both knighthood and England being of great significance to his troops.

Latin Suffragan Bishops of Lydda

- Robert of Rouen c 1099
- Roger fl. 1110 (Catholic)
- Constantinus (fl. 1154–1160)
- Reinier = Ranierus (fl. 1164 - death 1169)
- Bernard(us) of Lydda (1168?69–1174?90)
- Unknown bishop of Lydda who spoke to king Richard I Lionheart in 1192.
- Isias (Eastern Orthodox bishop) fl.1202.
- Pelagius (? - 27 May 1227), next bishop of Salamanca (Spain)
- Ralph I (mentioned in 1232)
- Ralph II † (fl 1238 - 1244)
- Arnald (fl. 1250–1253)
- William (? - 8 May 1263), next bishop of Agen (France)
- John of Troyes (before 1267 - after 1271)
- Godfrey (in 1286), ?Franciscan.

== Titular Latin bishopric ==
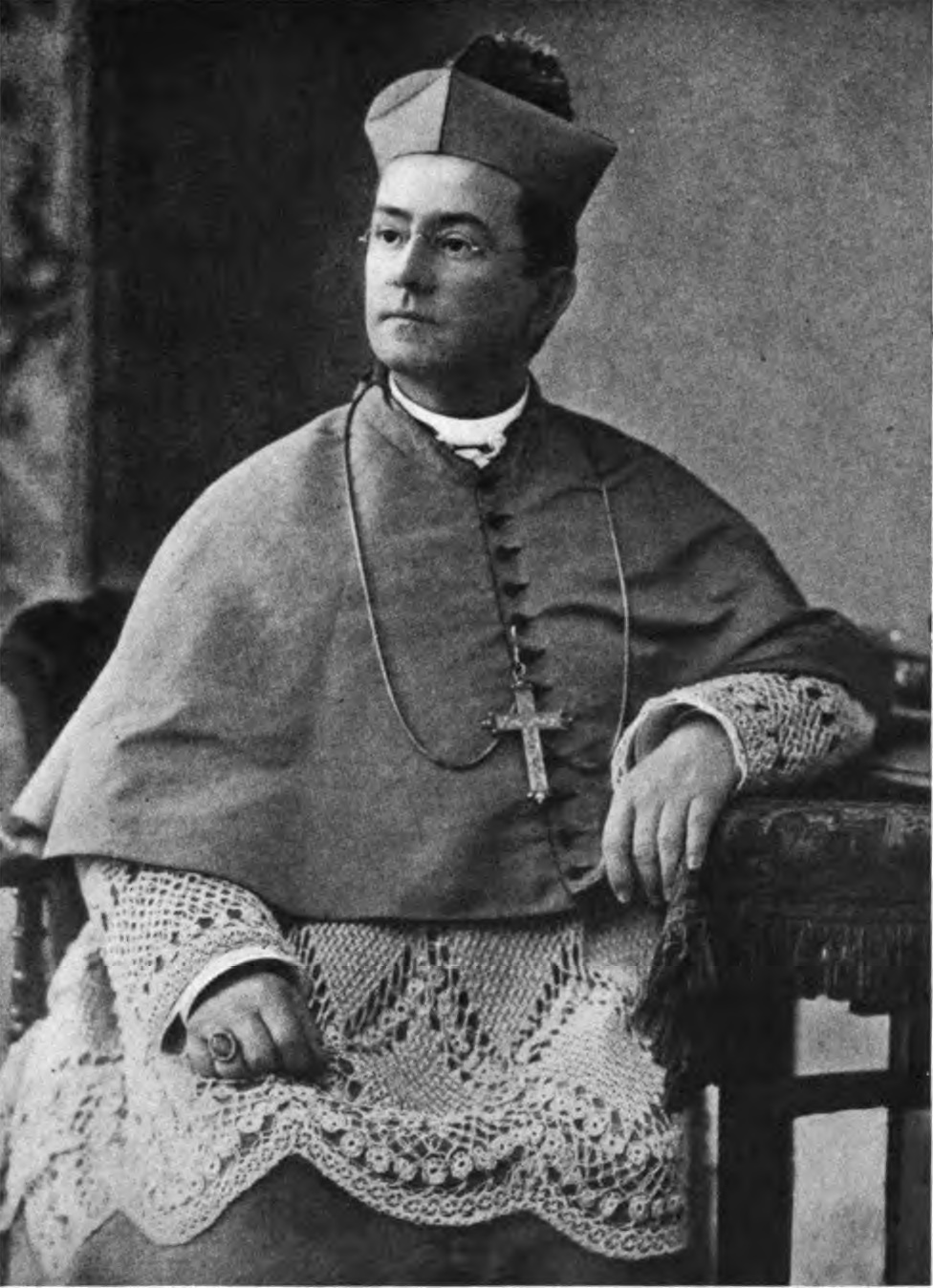
Bishop John Monaghan

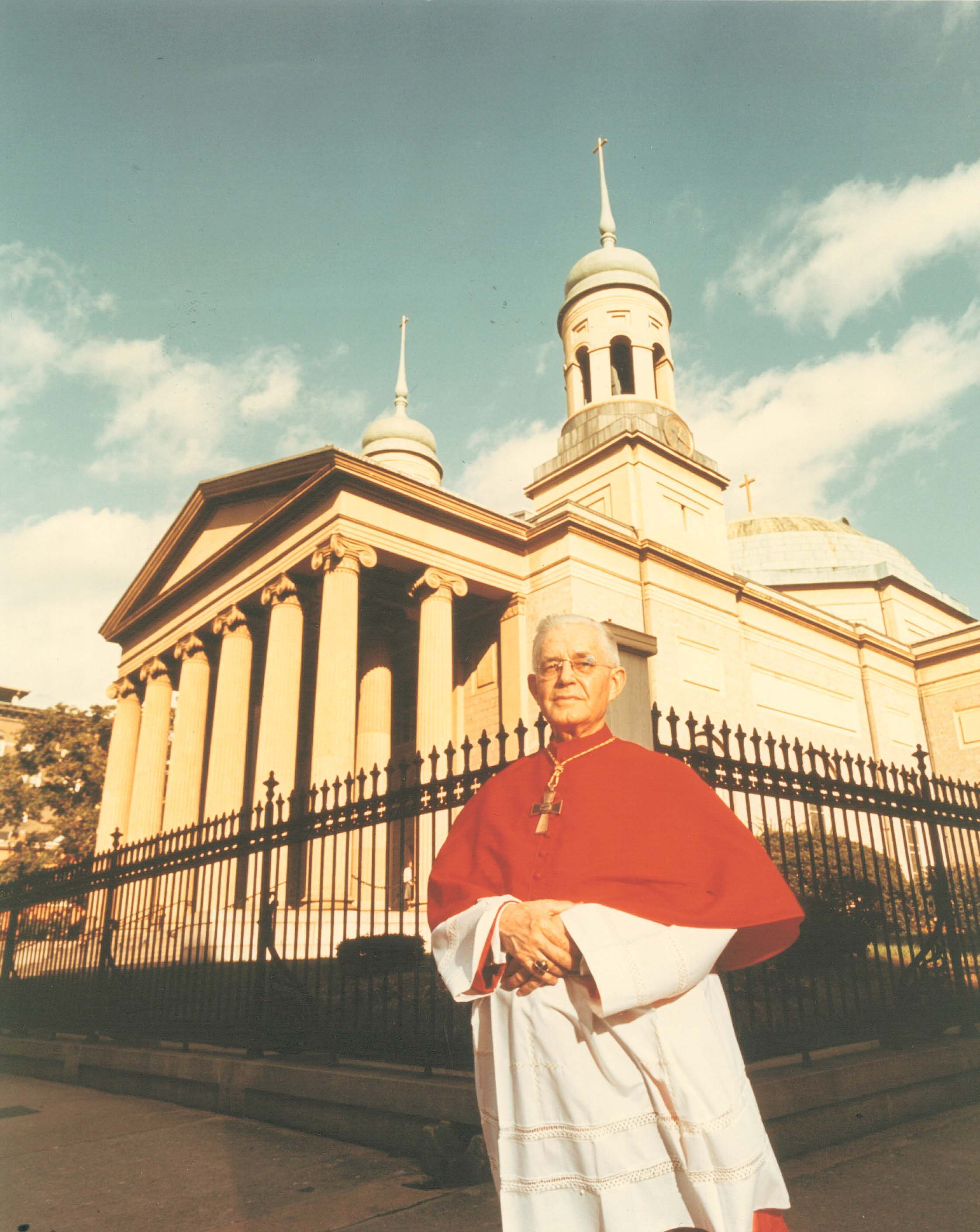
Lawrence Shehan

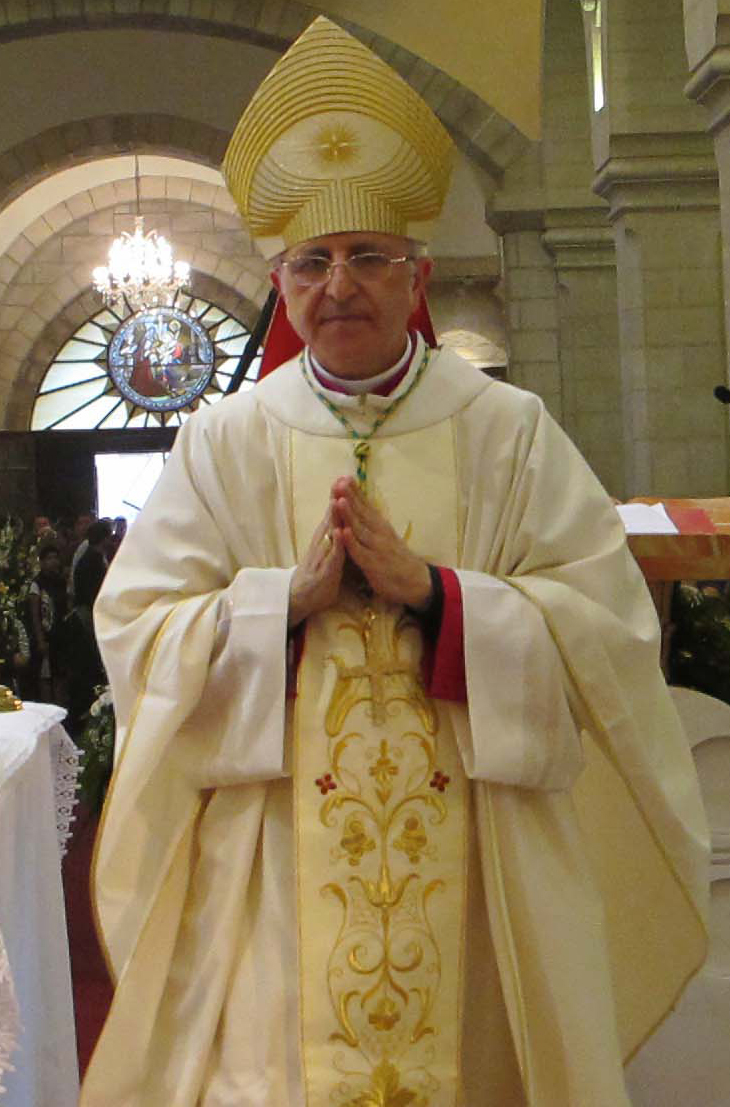
Bp William Shomali

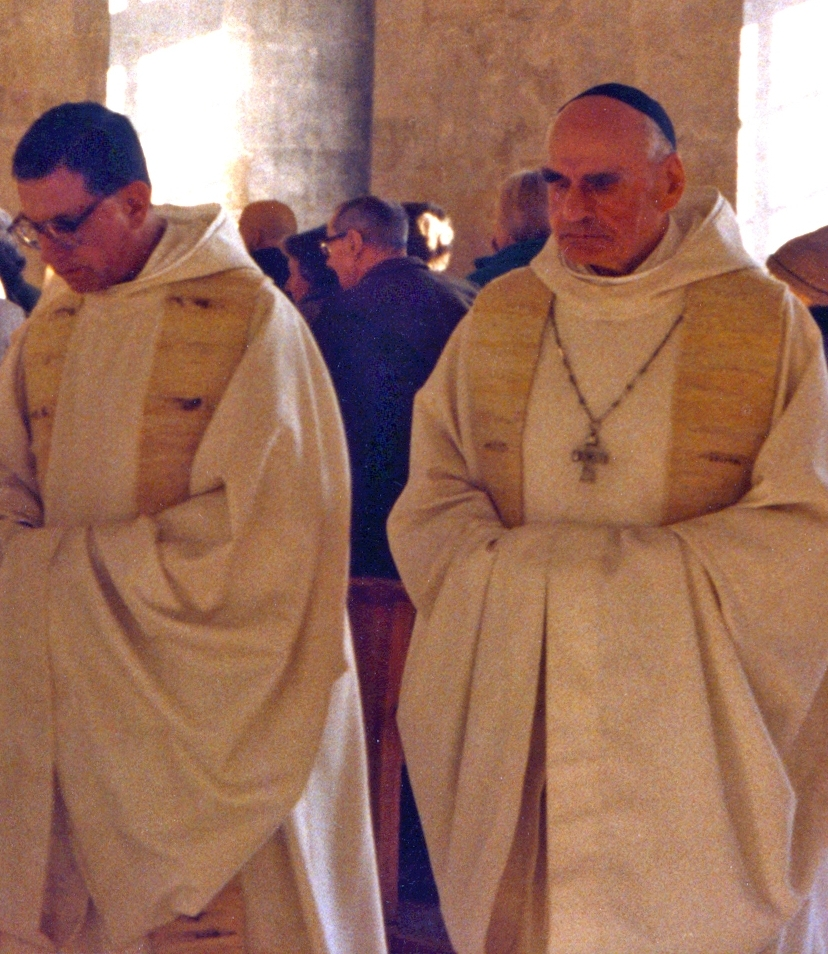
Dom Grammont

As the Crusader kingdom fell to Saladin, Lydda was truly in partibus infidelium. From the 15th century, it was a Latin titular bishopric both under the names Lydda and Diospolis in Palaestina, with a messy proliferation of titular incumbents the next century with up to eleven titular bishops 'on' the see of Lydda.

Titular Bishops of Lydda/ Diospolis

- Benedikt Sibenhirter, (20 Nov 1452 – 10 May 1458)
- Thomas Lydensis (fl. 1495)
- Nicolaus de Braciano, (29 April 1504 – 1509)
- Hermanus Nigenbroch, (7 Nov 1509 – 1511)
- Petrus Antonii (18 July 1511 – 1515)
- Heinrich von Hattingen (10 Dec 1515 - 1519)
- Giovanni Brainfort (26 Feb 1517 - 1521)
- Thomas Bele (7 June 1521 – 1524)
- Pompeo Musacchi (11 May 1524 – )
- Marcus Teggingeri (10 Dec 1568 – )
- Georges Scultetus (3 March 1603 -1613)
- Franz Weinhart (26 Feb 1663 – 22 June 1686)
- Francisco Varo (5 Feb 1687 – did not take effect)
- Giovanni Battista Bruni, (5 August 1765 – 21 Sep 1771)
- Johann Baptist Joseph Gobel (27 Jan 1772 – 7 Nov 1793, resigned)
- Anselmo Basilici (19 Dec 1814 – 25 May 1818)
- Francesco Pichi (25 May 1818 – 21 May 1827)
- Robert Gradwell (17 June 1828 – 15 March 1833)
- Henri Monnier (23 Feb 1872 – 28 Nov 1916)
- Bernard Nicholas Ward (22 March 1917 – 20 July 1917)
- Patrice Alexandre Chiasson (27 Jul 1917 – 9 Sep 1920)
- Michele Cerrati (15 Sep 1920 – 21 Feb 1925)
- John James Joseph Monaghan (10 July 1925 – 7 Jan 1935)
- William Richard Griffin (9 March 1935 – 18 March 1944)
- Girolamo Bartolomeo Bortignon (4 April 1944 – 9 Sep 1945)
- Lawrence Joseph Shehan (17 Nov 1945 – 25 August 1953)
- Frédéric Duc (11 Jan 1954 – 10 Dec 1970)
- Marcelino Sérgio Bicego (6 August 1971 – 26 May 1978)
- Jean-Baptiste Gourion, (14 August 2003 – 23 June 2005)
- William Hanna Shomali (31 March 2010 - ...)

== See also ==
- Catholic dioceses in the Holy Land and Cyprus
- Diospolis (disambiguation) for namesakes, including three titular bishoprics (in Egypt and Thrace)
