= Meuris =

Meuris is a French surname. Notable people with the surname include:

- Aimable Joseph Meuris (1760–1793), French tinsmith
- Georges Meuris (1907–1984), Belgian-born French footballer
- Jacques Meuris (1923–1993), Belgian writer, photographer, art critic, and poet
- Julien Meuris (born 1922), Belgian basketball player
- Robert Meuris (born 1928), Belgian professional footballer
- Stijn Meuris (born 1964), Belgian musician and journalist

== See also ==
- Meuris and Thea, two Christian women who were martyred at Gaza, Palestine
