= Patriarch William =

Patriarch William may refer to two Latin patriarchs of Jerusalem:

- William of Malines
- William II of Agen
