= William III of Agen =

13th-century Roman Catholic bishop

William III of Agen (French: Guillaume) was a French prelate of the Catholic Church who was the bishop of Lydda in the Kingdom of Jerusalem until 1263 and then the bishop of Agen in the Kingdom of France from 1263 until 1264.

A large part of William's diocese of Lydda remained in Latin hands after the Third Crusade, but the Cathedral of Saint George was destroyed and Ramla, where the co-cathedral was located, belonged to a condominium shared by Christians and Muslims. In August 1261, the then-Latin patriarch of Jerusalem, James Pantaleon, was elected pope and took the name Urban IV. He appointed Bishop William II of Agen to succeed him as patriarch of Jerusalem, which left the see of Agen vacant. In 1263, Pope Urban IV translated Bishop William of Lydda to Agen, the new patriarch's former see. John of Troyes succeeded William in Lydda. William's translation to Agen suggests that he was a man of extraordinary ability.

William made his ceremonial entry into Agen on 22 July 1263. He received the homage of his new vassals, but was too infirm to meet with Count Alphonse III of Toulouse, his feudal overlord. As bishop of Agen, William claimed a series of powers, including the right to dispense justice and mint own coins, at the time when the kings of France were already enforcing their own right in the region. William's tenure as the bishop of Agen was brief: he either died or resigned on account of his infirmities in 1264. Because they were namefellows and because in the early 1260s one moved from Agen to the Latin East while the other travelled from the Latin East to Agen, William III has been frequently confused with his predecessor, William II, later patriarch of Jerusalem.
