= Exultavit cor nostrum =

1260s papal bull to the Mongol Ilkhanate leader Hulagu

Exultavit cor nostrum is a letter, also known as a papal bull, from Pope Urban IV to the Mongol Ilkhanate leader Hulagu in 1263/1264.

The letter was evidently in response to a message brought to Urban by John the Hungarian, who claimed to be the Mongol envoy (it was not uncommon for individuals to present themselves as envoys, even when they were not). According to John, Hulagu desired to become a Christian, and requested that Urban send a representative who would help to baptise him.

Pope Urban responded with the Exultavit, which indicated that Urban had heard of Hulagu's sympathies towards Christianity through other sources. He also encouraged Hulagu to convert to Christianity. He cautiously welcomed Hulagu's envoy, and announced that William II of Agen, Latin Patriarch of Jerusalem, would be investigating further.

== Background ==
Hulagu was already aware of Christianity, as his mother Sorghaghtani Beki and his wife Doquz Khatun were both Christians and members of the Church of the East; Doquz later helped Denha I to ascend to the church's patriarchal throne.

The previous Catholic pope had sent four missions (two Dominican and two Franciscan) to the country in 1245. A few years later, Franciscan William of Rubruck travelled to Karakorum, and took part in a formal debate at court between Christians, Buddhists and Muslims, to determine which faith was correct.

== John the Hungarian ==
Little is known of John the Hungarian, except that he had some standing in Hulagu's court, was referred to in the Exultavit, and was possibly the intermediary between Hulagu and the Christians. However, when he arrived to Pope Urban, though John claimed to be Hulagu's envoy, he had no letters of credentials. He reportedly brought a letter written by Hulagu in Maragha on April 10, 1262, dated the Year of the Dog, and John's purpose was to transport the letter to King Louis IX of France. According to the historian Jean Richard, its wording "bore signs of the intermediary of a western scribe, probably the Ilkhan's Latin notary, Rychaldus." The letter followed the usual form of Mongol communications, expecting submission. It also referred to a gift received by the previous envoy Andrew of Longjumeau, and explained that the Mongols had previously thought that the pope was the leader of the Christian people, until "it had been realized where true power lay among the French." The letter went on to describe previous Mongol campaigns such as against the Assassins, and suggested joint efforts between the Mongols and the Christians against their common enemy, the Egyptian Mamluks. The letter also expressed Hulagu's desire to return Jerusalem to the Christians. King Louis sent John and the letter along to Pope Urban, and John probably returned to Maragha in late 1262.

== See also ==
- List of papal bulls
- Christianity among the Mongols
