= Phoebadius of Agen =

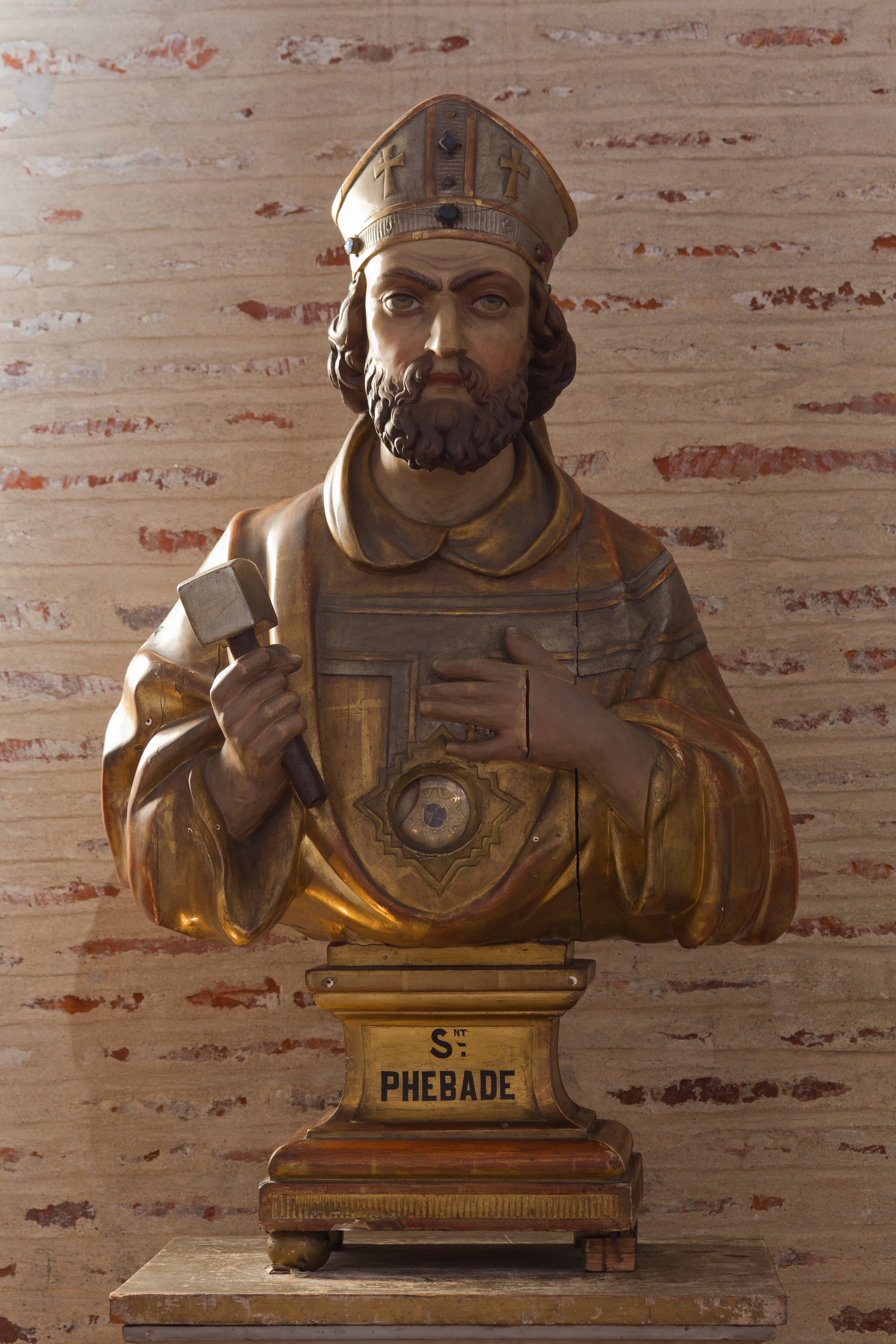
- A reliquary bust of Saint Phoebadius (Saint Phébade), venerated in the Basilica of Saint Sernin in Toulouse.

Bishop and Confessor
- Born: Aquitania, Gaul
- Died: ca. 392; Agen, Aquitania, Gaul
- Venerated in: Roman Catholic Church
- Feast: April 25

Phoebadius of Agen (also, Phaebadius, Foegadius, or, in French, Phébade; died ca. 392) was a Catholic bishop of the fourth century. At the Council of Ariminum in 359 and other councils, he was a supporter of Nicaean orthodoxy. He wrote several works, including a treatise against the Arians which still survives.

== Life ==
Phoebadius was a Gaul by birth. It seems likely that he was born in the province of Aquitania, since Sulpicius Severus refers to him as Foegadius noster ("our" Foegadius, a variant spelling of Phoebadius's name). He may have even been born in Agen, where he was bishop. When he became bishop is not known. It was very likely after 347, since he is not listed among the Gallic bishops who were present at the Council of Serdica in that year, a fact noted by Tillemont. He was certainly a bishop by 357, however, which was the year that he and other bishops rejected the so-called second Sirmian Confession, a pro-Arian creed endorsed by Constantius II. Alban Butler notes that Phoebadius's opposition to that confession was so successful that "in Aquitan it was universally rejected."

In 357 Phoebadius published a treatise against the Arians. Commenting on this Liber contra Arianos, Butler remarks that it is "written in so masterly a manner, with such solidity, justness, and close reasoning, as to make us regret the loss of his other works." Phoebadius figured prominently at the Council of Rimini in 359, where, along with Servatius of Tongeren, he advocated for the Nicaean position against the Arians. When ambiguity in the creed was later discovered by Phoebadius, he disavowed the council and advocated against its authority.

He was a friend of Hilary of Poitiers, with whom he collaborated in fighting the influence of Arianism in Gaul.

Phoebadius attended several other councils after Ariminum. He was present at the Council of Paris in 360, at the Council of Valence convened by the emperor Valentinian I in 374, and at the Council of Saragossa convened by his son and successor Valentinian II in 380. His involvement in the Council of Valence is inferred by the name "Foegadius" which appears in the first place in the synodal letter of the council, but the name of a diocese is not provided, the texts do not say that he presided at the council, and is his name is not listed among the subscribers.

The year of his death is not known, but he was still living in 392. That is the year when Jerome wrote his work De viris illustribus, which mentions that Phoebadius was alive, although of an advanced age. The short biography provided by Jerome reads as follows:

Phoebadius, Agenni Galliarum episcopus, edidit contra Arianos librum. Dicuntur et eius alia esse opuscula, quae necdum legi. Vivit usque hodie decrepita senectute.
"Phoebadius, bishop of Agen, in Gaul, published a book Against the Arians. There are said to be other works by him, which I have not yet read. He is still living, infirm with age."

The feast day of Phoebadius is celebrated on April 25 in the Diocese of Agen.
