= Peter (bishop of Bethlehem) =

Peter was a clergyman of the Latin Church who served as the bishop of Bethlehem in the Kingdom of Jerusalem until his death in 1205.

Bishop Ralph of Bethlehem was captured during the Third Crusade in 1192 and died in captivity. Because this crusade failed to recover Bethlehem or retain Ascalon for the Kingdom of Jerusalem, the seat of the bishop of Bethlehem moved to Acre. By August 1196, a successor to the see of Bethlehem had been appointed. Pope Celestine III tasked him and the archbishop of Tyre, Joscius, with ensuring that the rights of Venetian merchants in Tyre be respected. In January 1197, the pope declared that the archbishop of Nazareth and the bishops of Bethlehem and Acre should perform the consecration of Alan, chancellor of King Aimery of Cyprus, as archbishop of Nicosia. Along with the Latin patriarch of Jerusalem, Aymar the Monk, and all other bishops and secular leaders of the kingdom, the bishop of Bethlehem took part in a gathering with the princes of the Holy Roman Empire during the German Crusade in 1198; at the meeting, it was decided that the German hospital in Acre should become a military order, later known as the Teutonic Order. It is not known whether it was Peter who was the bishop of Bethlehem from 1196 to 1198.

Peter was present when the Fourth Crusade attacked and sacked Zara, a Christian city in Dalmatia, in November 1202. He and John of Noyon, bishop-elect of Acre, followed the crusade leadership to Constantinople. In 1204, shortly after the sack of the city, Peter and John were among the bishops who elected Count Baldwin IX of Flanders to be the first Latin emperor of Constantinople. Peter stayed in Constantinople rather than proceed to Palestine. He took advantage of the sack to secure for the church of Bethlehem the Monastery of the Panagia Hodegetria and within it the Panagia Hodegetria, one of Constantinople's most revered icons.

Peter never returned to the Kingdom of Jerusalem. He was killed by the army of King Kaloyan of Bulgaria at the Battle of Adrianople, a disastrous defeat for the Latins, in April 1205.
