= Thomas Agni of Lentini =

13th-century Latin patriarch of Jerusalem

Thomas Agni of Lentini OP (Italian: Tommaso; c. 1200 – September 1277) was a Sicilian prelate of the Catholic Church who was successively the bishop of Bethlehem in the Kingdom of Jerusalem (1259–1267), archbishop of Cosenza in the Kingdom of Sicily (1267–1271), and Latin patriarch of Jerusalem (1271–1277). He had the powers of a papal legate during his career in the Kingdom of Jerusalem and thus acted as the highest authority there during the Mongol invasions of the Levant. He was recalled to Europe in 1263, but returned after being appointed patriarch.

== Early career ==
Thomas was born in the early 13th century in Lentini, near Syracuse. Pope Gregory IX sent him to preach in Naples. In late 1231 he founded the first Dominican convent in Naples at the church Sant’Arcangelo di Morfisa. He was prior in 1243 when Thomas Aquinas was admitted to the Order.

== Episcopate ==
=== Bishop and archbishop ===
Thomas was appointed bishop of Bethlehem and papal legate in the Holy Land by Pope Alexander IV in 1259. He thus became the first member of a mendicant order to become a bishop in the Kingdom of Jerusalem. He arrived there in the spring of 1259. Because he came with legatine powers, Thomas outranked the Latin patriarch of Jerusalem, James Pantaleon, to whom he should otherwise have been subordinate as a suffragan. The indignant patriarch left the kingdom and travelled to Rome. At the same time, the kingdom had no secular ruler present. This left Thomas as the ultimate authority in the land. During his episcopate the Diocese of Bethlehem continued to receive endowments in Europe but no new land in the Latin East. Thomas received the pope's permission to exchange distant properties with those that would be easier to manage.

When the Mongols invaded the Levant in 1260, Thomas requested help from Count Charles I of Anjou. Thomas excommunicated all Latin Christians who submitted to the Mongols or aided them, including Prince Bohemond VI of Antioch. The alliance of King Hethum II of Cilician Armenia with the Mongols irked the Latin clergy in Acre, and Thomas–acting as the papal legate–summoned the Armenian catholicos, Constantine I, to meet him in Acre. Such an order was unprecedented. Constantine replied that he was too old to make the journey from Cilicia, and sent the theologian Mekhitar of Daschir and the Armenian bishop of Jerusalem to represent him. Mekhitar was a staunch opponent of the union between the Armenian Church and the Latin Church and vigorously attacked the notion of papal supremacy over the other apostolic sees, and the union effectively fell through.

It was probably Thomas who prevailed on the High Court to adopt a policy of neutrality in the Mongols' war against the Mamluk Sultanate and to allow the Mamluk troops to pass through the kingdom to fight off the Mongols. This proved catastrophic for the kingdom because they came to be completely encircled by the Mamluks following the latter's victory against the Mongols. Afterwards Thomas and the other clergy mediated peace between the Venetian and Genoese communities in Acre, the capital of the rump kingdom, though their war continued elsewhere in the Latin East for years to come.

James Pantaleon was elected pope in 1261 and took the name Urban IV. As his successor in the patriarchate of Jerusalem he appointed William of Agen. While William stayed in Europe, Thomas's position remained unchanged. In order to spare William the familiar humiliation of being outranked by a suffragan, the pope ordered Thomas to return to Europe in September 1263. Yet the pope did not resent Thomas, and appointed him his vicar in Rome and had him preach a crusade against King Manfred of Sicily. Thomas stayed in Europe after the death of Urban IV and the election of Clement IV in 1264. Charles of Anjou deposed Manfred and became king of Sicily in 1266. Thomas was appointed archbishop of Cosenza by Clement IV on April 18, 1267.

=== Patriarch ===
The papacy became vacant in November 1268 and so after the death of William of Agen there was no pope who could appoint a new patriarch of Jerusalem. Finally, in 1271, Gregory X was elected pope. Gregory was staying in Acre at the time with the Lord Edward's crusade and likely conferred with the new king of Jerusalem, Hugh III of Cyprus, about the appointment of a new patriarch of Jerusalem. Thomas was chosen, having proven himself capable and informed about the issues of the Latin East. His powers as papal legate were renewed and extended to Jerusalem, north Syria, Cilicia, and Cyprus. Thomas met with Charles of Anjou in the summer of 1272, then sailed from Messina and arrived in Acre in October 1272. Edward Longshanks had just left the kingdom, having concluded a truce with the Mamluks, and Thomas thus found the kingdom at peace.

Perhaps under King Hugh's influence, Thomas's patriarchate saw an increase in the promotion of local clergy to episcopal offices. Thomas mediated in the dispute between Hugh and Hugh's aunt Maria of Antioch, who claimed that she was the rightful heir to the throne Jerusalem. In 1276, he exhorted King Rudolf I of Germany to come to the Latin East on crusade. That same year King Hugh left the mainland kingdom, declaring it ungovernable, and moved back to Cyprus. Thomas took charge and procured the appointment of Balian of Arsuf as the bailiff. In 1277, Maria sold her rights to the throne of Jerusalem to Charles of Anjou and a Sicilian fleet under the command of Roger of San Severino landed in Acre. Thomas died in Acre in September that year.

== Works ==
A collection of sermons is attributed to him. His main work, written before 1276, was a biography of Peter Martyr of Verona, the first ever biography of this saint.

Preceded by Godfrey de Prefectis	Bishop of Bethlehem; 1259-1267	Succeeded by Gaillard d'Oursault
Preceded by Bartholomew Pignatelli	Archbishop of Cosenza; 1267-1271	Succeeded by Richard of Benevento
Preceded by William of Agen	Latin Patriarch of Jerusalem; 1271–1277	Succeeded by Elias Peleti
