= Catholic dioceses in the Holy Land and Cyprus =

Catholic dioceses in the Holy Land and Cyprus is a multi-rite, international episcopate in Israel and Cyprus.

== History ==
The only Latin hierarch, the Patriarch of Jerusalem, who outranks all others, sits in the Conference of the Latin Bishops of the Arab Regions, whereas the Eastern Catholic Bishops partake in rite-specific synods.

There is an Apostolic Delegation to Jerusalem and Palestine as papal diplomatic representation (under embassy-level) in Jerusalem, an Apostolic Nunciature (embassy-level) in Amman, an Apostolic Nunciature (embassy-level) to Cyprus (in Nicosia), an Apostolic Nunciature to Israel in Jaffa.

== Current jurisdictions ==
=== Latin ===
- Latin Patriarchate of Jerusalem, no suffragan, for all of the Holy Land (Palestine & Israel), Jordan and Cyprus.

=== Eastern Catholic ===
- Transnational

==== Maronite Catholic ====
Antiochian Rite, under the Maronite Catholic Patriarchate of Antioch and the Whole Levant, at Beirut (Lebanon)

- Maronite Catholic Archeparchy of Haifa and the Holy Land, in Israel, whose Archeparch holds the offices of Patriarchal Vicar of:
  - Maronite Catholic Patriarchal Exarchate of Jerusalem and Palestine in the Palestinian Territories and
  - Maronite Catholic Patriarchal Exarchate of Jordan in Jordan
- Maronite Catholic Archeparchy of Cyprus in Nicosia, for all Cyprus

==== Melkite Catholic ====
Byzantine Rite, as Patriarch of Antioch and All the East, Alexandria and Jerusalem, ex officio holding the style of Titular Patriarch of Jerusalem

- Melkite Greek Catholic Archeparchy of Akka (Israel, including Haifa, Nazareth and all Galilee)
- Melkite Greek Catholic Archeparchy of Jerusalem of the Melkites (a patriarchal vicariate for the Palestinian territories)
- Jordan: Melkite Greek Catholic Archeparchy of Petra and Philadelphia in Amman and all Transjordan

==== Armenian Catholic ====
Armenian Rite, under the Armenian Catholic Patriarchate of Cilicia (nominally in Asia Minor, but with cathedral See in Beirut, Lebanon)

- Armenian Catholic Patriarchal Exarchate of Jerusalem and Amman, Exarchate with cathedral See in Jerusalem, for the Holy Land (Israel/ Palestine) and Jordan

==== Chaldean Catholic ====
Chaldean Rite, under the Chaldean Catholic Patriarchate of Baghdad, with a cathedral See in Baghdad

- Chaldean Catholic Territory Dependent on the Patriarch of Jordan

==== Syrian (Syriac) Catholic ====
Antiochian Rite, under the Syrian Catholic Patriarchate of Antioch, with a cathedral see in Beirut

- Syrian Patriarchal Exarchate of Jerusalem, with cathedral see in Jerusalem, for the Holy Land (Palestine and Israel) and Jordan.

== Defunct jurisdictions ==
=== Titular sees in the Holy Land ===
==== Palestinian Territories ====
- 4 Metropolitan Titular archbishoprics: Caesarea in Palæstina of the Romans, Caesarea in Palæstina of the Melkites, Archdiocese of Nazareth and Archdiocese of Scythopolis
- 10 Episcopal Titular bishoprics: Diocese of Archelaïs, Diocese of Bethlehem, Diocese of Bitylius, Diocese of Capharnaum, Diocese of Gaza, Diocese of Ierichus, Diocese of Maiumas Gazæ, Diocese of Menois, Diocese of Neapolis in Palæstina, Diocese of Sycomazon.

==== Jordan ====
- Metropolitan Titular archbishopric: Archdiocese of Petra in Palæstina
- 20 Episcopal Titular bishoprics: Diocese of Abila in Palæstina, Diocese of Æla, Diocese of Amathus in Palæstina, Diocese of Arad, Diocese of Areopolis, Diocese of Arindela, Diocese of Augustopolis in Palæstina, Diocese of Bacatha in Palestina, Diocese of Capitolias, Diocese of Charac-Moba, Diocese of Chrysopolis in Arabia, Draso, Diocese of Elusa, Diocese of Esbus, Diocese of Gadara, Diocese of Gerasa, Diocese of Medaba, Diocese of Philadelphia in Arabia, Diocese of Zoara.

==== Israel ====
- Archiepiscopal Titular archbishopric: Archdiocese of Nazareth
- 28 Episcopal Titular bishoprics: Diocese of Akka, Diocese of Anthedon, Diocese of Antipatris, Diocese of Ascalon, Diocese of Azotus, Diocese of Diocæsarea in Palæstina, Diocese of Dora, Diocese of Ecsalus, Diocese of Eleutheropolis in Palæstina, Diocese of Emmaüs, Diocese of Gabæ, Diocese of Gazera, Diocese of Gerara, Diocese of Hebron, Diocese of Hippos, Diocese of Iamnia, Diocese of Ioppe, Diocese of Livias, Diocese of Lydda, Diocese of Massimianopolis in Palæstina, Diocese of Porphyreon, Ptolemais in Phœnicia * Ptolemais in Phœnicia, Diocese of Sebaste in Palæstina, Diocese of Sozusa in Palæstina, Diocese of Tiberias, Diocese of Tricomia, Diocese of Zabulon.

=== Titular sees in Cyprus ===
- 2 Metropolitan Titular archbishoprics: Archdiocese of Nicosia, Archdiocese of Salamis
- 17 Episcopal Titular bishoprics: Diocese of Amathus in Cypro, Diocese of Arsinoë in Cypro, Diocese of Carpasia, Diocese of Ceraunia, Diocese of Cerynia, Diocese of Chytri, Diocese of Citium, Diocese of Curium, Diocese of Famagusta, Diocese of Lapithus, Diocese of Neapolis in Cypro, Diocese of Nemesi, Diocese of Paphus, Diocese of Salamias, Diocese of Soli, Diocese of Tamasus, Diocese of Tremithus.

== See also ==
- Religion in Israel
