= Meuris and Thea =

Two Christian martyrs

Saints Meuris and Thea
- Died: c. 307; Gaza, Palestine
- Feast: 19 December.

Saints Meuris and Thea (perhaps the same as Valentina and Thea; died c. 307) were two Christian women who were martyred at Gaza, Palestine. Their feast day is 19 December.

== Monks of Ramsgate account ==
The Monks of Ramsgate wrote in their Book of Saints (1921),

Meuris and Thæa (SS.) MM.s (Dec. 19)
(4th century) Two Christian maidens who suffered martyrdom at Gaza in Palestine about A.D. 307. It is not clear that these Saints are other than the Saint Valentina and her anonymous fellow-sufferer, commemorated on July 25.

Valentina and others (SS.) VV.MM. (July 25)
(4th cent.) Christian maidens who suffered together in Palestine (A.D. 308) in the last great persecution.

== Butler's account ==
The hagiographer Alban Butler (1710–1773) wrote in his Lives of the Fathers, Martyrs, and Other Principal Saints under December 19,

SS. Meuris and Thea, two holy women at Gaza in Palestine, when the persecution raged in that city under the successors of Dioclesian, bore up bravely against all the cruelty of men, and malice of the devil, and triumphed over both to the last moment. Meuris died under the hands of the persecutors: but Thea languished some time after she had passed through a dreadful variety of exquisite torments, as we learn from the author of the life of Saint Porphyrius, of Gaza, written about the close of the fourth century. Their relics were deposited in a church which bore the name of Saint Timothy; on whom see August 19.

== Eusebius and Cureton's notes ==
Eusebius, Bishop of Caesarea, records how in Diospolis at this time a virgin named Valentina and her sister were tortured and then bound together and burned to death. William Cureton (1808–1864) in his translation of Eusebius's History of the Martyrs in Palestine notes that Eusebius gives no name for Valentina's companion, calling her only "the sister". He goes on,

Valesius gives this note:– "This virgin's name is wanting here, but we will supply this defect from the Grecian Menology; where this passage occurs at the 15th of July, On the same day the holy Martyrs Valentina and Thea, which were Egyptians, being brought to the city Dio Caesarea, before Firmillianus the judge, made confessions of Christ's name, who is our God; after which, their left feet being burnt and their right eyes pulled out, they were killed with a sword and their bodies burnt. But this account disagrees with Eusebius's relation here. For he says one was born at Gaza and the other at Caesarea, and he makes no mention of the burning of their feet of the pulling out of their eyes.

Cureton goes on the explain that the compilers of the Menologium may have assumed that these two virgins, which were mentioned by Eusebius just after an account of some Egyptians, were also Egyptians and suffered the same fate.

In a longer Syriac language version of Eusebius' account, the name of the virgin from Gaza martyred at Diospolis alongside Valentina of Caesarea in given as Ennatha.

== Sources ==
- Butler, Alban (1857), The lives of the fathers, martyrs, and other principal saints. ed. by F.C. Husenbeth, vol. 2, Dublin: Henry This article incorporates text from this source, which is in the public domain.
- Eusebius Caesariensis (1861), Cureton, William (ed.), History of the Martyrs in Palestine, Williams and Norgate This article incorporates text from this source, which is in the public domain.
- St. Augustine's Abbey, Ramsgate (1921). The Book of saints : a dictionary of servants of God canonized by the Catholic Church. London: A. & C. Black, ltd. OCLC 671676136. This article incorporates text from this source, which is in the public domain.
