= Roman Catholic Diocese of Bethléem à Clamecy =

Bishopric in Nièvre, in France

Coordinates: 47°27′36″N 3°31′27″E

The Diocese of Bethléem à Clamecy was a crusader bishopric in residential exile with see at Clamecy, Nièvre in Burgundy, eastern France, made exempt (i.e. directly subject to the Holy see, not part of any (French) ecclesiastical province).

== History ==
The Bishop of the crusader diocese of Bethlehem, in the Holy Land, was favored by William IV, the Count of Nevers who died in Bethlehem as crusader, and inherited from him land near Clamecy (notably the hamlet Pantehenor), where a hospice (Maison-Dieu, a clergy-run hospital) had been established. In 1223, after the 1187 fall of the crusader Kingdom of Jerusalem in Palestine to Ayyubid Sultan Saladin, the Bishop Rainiero (a Cistercian) took residence in Clamecy.

Although the see was never granted membership in the French States-General (arguably being an 'overseas' see), the cathedral was the formal seat of the Diocese of Bethlehem in partibus infidelium (or Bethléem à/les Clamecy) from 1223. Several of its bishops didn't actually reside in their tiny Burgundian bishopric (just Panthenor, the hospice and the chapel plus some revenues), taking up clerical offices elsewhere, as Auxiliary bishop or vicar general in larger (French) (arch)dioceses.

The Dominican Guillaume (instated 1331) probably was the last incumbent of Bethlehem to set foot in his 'original' Palestinian diocese, where he hoped to restore the basilica (raising significant funds) and may have died (1346?47).

During the long-standing Papal schism (from 1378), Clamecy had two rivaling series of Bishops from 1379 to 1422 : those loyal to Rome, hence canonical, but in Italian (double) exile, where they could only collect revenues from the see's Italian possessions, and schismatical pretenders, who however took actual possession in (after all French) Burgundy in the name of Antipopes at Avignon (Clement VII and Benedict XIII) or Pisa (Alexander V and John XXIII).

In 1413, King Charles VI of France agreed the see should have the same privileges as all residential French bishoprics, but his clergy kept arguing Clamecy was 'only' a titular see in partibus infidelium, even after the regular legal and canonical nomination by the crown and the Holy see was clearly covered by the Pragmatic Sanction of Bourges from 1438 and by the Concordat of Bologna (1516), after which the king delegated his nomination for Clamecy to the Duchy of Nevers. Especially the Diocese of Auxerre and other neighbor sees kept contesting Clamecy's spiritual and canonical jurisdiction, and of course its benefices, seeking recourse in lawsuits, notably with the (regional) parliament (feudal appellate court) on 22 February 1674 and the general assembly of the French clergy on 27 August 1770.

In the second half of the 16th century, they see remained vacant as the nominees of the Dukes of Nevers (by royal delegation) were refused papal confirmation.

The Bishopric of Bethlehem(-Ascalon) in the Holy Land was nominally restored (a first time) in 1462(?), existing as a Latin Catholic titular bishopric alongside the residential Clamecy until its suppression in 1603(?).

In 1790, the Diocese of Bethléem à Clamecy was abolished as a residential see during the French Revolution (later affirmed by the Napoleonic Concordat of 1801), its territory being merged on 29 November into the Diocese of Autun. Presently it is part of the Archdiocese of Sens.

The Bishopric of Bethlehem(-Ascalon) in the Holy Land was nominally restored again on 3 July 1840 by Pope Gregory XVI as a Latin Catholic titular bishopric and this time give the Apostolic succession of the Burgundian Bethlehem. Its title was however vested in the Territorial Abbots Ordinaries of the Territorial Abbacy of Saint-Maurice d’Agaune (the sole abbey of the Swiss Congregation of Canons Regular of St. Maurice's Abbey in Switzerland) held the title of Bishop of Bethlehem in personal union from 3 July 1840 until 1970s — it has been vacant since 1987.

== Episcopal ordinaries ==
(all Roman rite)

Suffragan Bishops of Bethléem à Clamecy

- Geoffroi de Perfectis (1224 – 1247?)
- Thomas Agni da Lentini, Dominican Order (O.P.) (1258 – 1263), next Metropolitan Archbishop of Roman Catholic Archdiocese of Cosenza (Italy) (1267.04.18 – 1272.03.17), Latin Patriarch of Jerusalem (Palestine) (1272.03.17 – death 1277.09.22)
- Galhard d’Oursault (1263? – 1275?)
- Hugues de Curtis (Ugo), O.P. (1279 – 1296?), previously Bishop of Troia (Italy) (1278 – 1279)
- Durand (? – ?)
- Gérard de Gisors (? – death 1300)
- Wulfran d’Abbeville (1301 – 1316), vicar general in the Archdiocese of Rouen
- Jean d’Egglescliff (Eglesfield) (1317 – ?)
- Pierre (Pietro), O.P. (1347.11.05 – death 1355?), previously Bishop of Segni (Italy) (1346.06.26 – 1347.11.05)
- Adhémar Fabri de La Roche, O.P. (1363.11.13 – 1378.11.10), vicar general in the Diocese of Geneva; next Bishop of Saint-Paul-Trois-Châteaux (France) (1378.11.10 – 1385.07.12), Bishop of Geneva (Genève, Switzerland) (1385.07.12 – death 1388.10.08)
- Giuliano (1379? – 1380)
  - uncanonical [i.e. obedient to an Antipope in Avignon (or Pisa), not to Rome] Guillaume de Vallan, O.P. (1379.07.13 – 1388.12.02), later canonical Bishop of Évreux (Normandy, France) (1388.12.02 – death 1400.04.23)
- Giovanni Salvucci di Fucecchio, Friars Minor (O.F.M.) (1380.10.29 – 1383.10.09), next Bishop of Lucca (Italy) (1383.10.09 – death 1393.09.24)
- William Bottlesham (1383 – 1385.12.02), next Bishop of Llandaff (Wales) (1385.12.02 – 1389.08.27), Bishop of Rochester (England) (1389.08.27 – death 1400.02)
- Lanfranc (1385.12.12 – 1409?)
  - uncanonical Guillaume de Martelet (1388.12.02 – death 1402)
  - uncanonical Gerardo di Bisarchio (Gérard de Gisors), Carmelite Order (O. Carm.) (1402.08.28 – death 1403), previously uncanonical Bishop of Ottana (Sardinia, Italy) (1390.11.21 – 1402.08.28)
  - uncanonical Jean Lami (1403.07.30 – 1408.02.27), next ?canonical Bishop of Sarlat (France) (1408.02.27 – death 1410.10.15)
  - uncanonical Gérard (1408.02.27 – death 1410)
  - uncanonical Michel le Doyen, O.F.M. (1411.07.15 – ?)
  - uncanonical Jean Marchand, O.P. (1412.09.19 – death 1422.12.11)
- Laurent Pignon, O.P. (1423.03.05 – 1428), next Bishop of Auxerre (France) (1433 – 1449)
- Jean de La Roche, O.F.M. (1428.12.03 – 1433.09.19), next Bishop of Cavaillon (1433.09.19 – death 1436)
- Dominique, O.F.M. (1433.09.24 – death 1436)
- Arnoul-Guillaume de Limonne, O. Carm. (1436.11.26 – death 1457)
- Étienne Pilerand, O.F.M. (1457.10.07 – 1463)
- Antoine Buisson, O. Carm. (1463.10.08 – death 1477?), previously Titular Bishop of Hippo Zarytus (1460.02.13 – 1463.10.08), Auxiliary bishop in the Diocese of Autun
- Jean Pilory Bilar, O.P. (1477.09.18 – 1482?), Auxiliary bishop in the Diocese of Amiens (Picardy)
- Bertrand d’Audigier or Albergey (Albigey) (1483? – 1486?), vicar general in the Diocese of Mende and Auxiliary bishop in the Diocese of Clermont
- Pierre de Saint-Maximin (1489 – 1492)
- Hubert Léonard, O. Carm. (1489.07.06 – retired 1492.12.03), Auxiliary bishop in the Diocese of Liège (a 'German' prince-bishopric based in present Belgium); previously Titular Bishop of Dara (1474.11.16 – 1489.07.06); emeritate again as Titular Bishop of Dara (1492.12.03 – ?)
- Jacques Héméré (1492.12.03 – ?)
- Jean L’Apôtre, Augustinian Order (O.E.S.A.) (1497.02.22 – death 1499)
- Antoine Coinel (1499.08.23 – death 1512)
- Martin Bailleux, O.F.M. (1513.06.22 – death 1524), previously Bishop of Arcadia (? – 1513.06.22)
- Philibert de Beaujeu, Benedictine Order (O.S.B.) (1524.08.17 – death 1555?), Auxiliary bishop in the Diocese of Auxerre
- Tommaso Albizi, O.P. (1525.02.10 – ?), previously Bishop of Cagli (Italy) (1513 – 1524)
- Alonso Cristóbal Arguellada (born Spain) (1550.07.04 – 1572), previously Auxiliary Bishop of Diocese of Jaén (Spain) (1550.07.04 – 1558); later Auxiliary Bishop of Diocese of Sigüenza (Spain) (1558 – death1572)
- Father Dominique Flélin (1556.02.10 – 1558 not possessed)
- Urbain Reversy (1560.09.04 – death 1560)
- Father Antoine Trusson, O.E.S.A. (1560.12.05 – 1568 not possessed)
- Father Charles Bourbonnat, O.E.S.A. (1568.09.10 – death 1583 not possessed)
- Father Simon Jourdain, O.E.S.A. (1583? – death 1587? not possessed)
- Louis de Clèves, O.S.B. (1605.08.03 – death 1609.03)
- Jean de Cléves, Augustinian Canons Regular (C.R.S.A.) (1611.05.02 – death 1619.10.09)
- André de Sauzéa (1623.10.23 – death 1644.04.03)
- Jean François de Bontemps (1644.04.12 – death 1650.06.19)
- Christophe d’Autier de Sisgau (1651.02.27 – retired 1663.10), died 1667
- François de Batailler (1664.04.28 – death 1701.06.20)
- Chérubin-Louis Le Bel, Recollect Franciscans (O.F.M. Rec.) (1713.12.11 – death 1738.10.08)
- Louis-Bernard de La Taste, O.S.B. (1739.02.23 – death 1754.04.22)
- Charles-Marie de Quélen (1754.12.16 – death 1777.04.21)
- François-Camille de Duranti de Lironcourt (1777.08.30 – death 1801).

== Cathedral ==
Its cathedral episcopal see (Cathédrale Notre-Dame-de-Bethléem), dedicated to Our Lady of Bethlehem, now the Chapelle Notre-Dame-de-Bethléem, was started in the 12th as episcopal chapel and completed in the 15th century. Bishop Arnaud de Limone (1436-1457) restored the chapel of Our Lady and fitted it with a chapter of canons.

The hospital and the chapel are now a hotel and restaurant. The chapel is a listed monument since 1927.

The area immediately surrounding the church, on the east side of the river Yonne, is now known as Bethléem, though it is within the commune of Clamecy.

== See also ==
- List of Catholic dioceses in France
- List of Catholic dioceses in Holy land and Cyprus
- Roman Catholic Archbishopric of Nazareth, fellow crusader see in exile (at Barletta in Apulia, southern Italy)

== Sources and external links ==
- GCatholic - Clamency, with Google satellite photo
- Location
- Nevers at the Catholic Encyclopedia
- History of the bishopric of Bethlehem (in French)
- GCatholic - titular see of Bethlehem

Cathedral

- Cathedrals of Bourgogne at the French Ministry of Culture
