= Bacatha in Palaestina =

Bacatha in Palestina was a town and episcopal see in the late Roman province of Palaestina Salutaris or Palaestina Tertia (today's southern Israel and Jordan), the provincial capital and metropolitan see of which was Petra. The town of Safut, close to As-Salt in Jordan, has been tentatively identified as ancient Bacatha.

== Diocese of Bacatha in Palestina ==
Bacata was once a bishopric. As a diocese that is no longer residential, it is listed in the Annuario Pontificio among titular sees.

The names of four of its bishops are known: Alypius took part in the Second Council of Ephesus in 449, and Gregory in the Council of Chalcedon in 518; Barachus is mentioned in relation to events of 532 and 536; and in 649 there was an exchange of letters between Anthony and Pope Martin I.
