= Pierre de Reims =

French Catholic bishop (died 1247)

Start of Isaiah surrounded by the Glossa dominicana

Pierre de Reims (Latin: Petrus Remensis or de Remis; died 29 January 1247) was a French Dominican prelate and preacher.

Pierre belonged to the first generation of Dominicans in Paris. He was the prior provincial of France and prior of Saint-Jacques in Paris from 1224 to 1233, during which time Hugh of Saint-Cher, who succeeded him as prior, joined the order. When Hugh was made a cardinal in 1244, Pierre resumed the priorate until 1245, when he was elected bishop of Agen. He was consecreated on 30 November. He was succeeded as prior by Humbert of Romans. He died in office on 29 January 1247.

Around 1240, Pierre compiled the Glossa dominicana, a glossed Bible with a standardised mise-en-page based on Hugh of Saint-Cher's shorter postil. It is known from many manuscripts. Pierre was also a prolific preacher. Some 515 of his sermons have been identified. Six of these found in the collection in manuscript Laud Misc. 511 were drawn from the lost manuscripts Parvus Liber Rubeus and Liber Rubeus Minor, which in turn probably drew from a collection of Pierre's sermons. Notably for a Dominican, he wrote a sermon for the translation of Francis of Assisi.
