= Diospolis =

Diospolis ('City of Zeus') may refer to:

== Asia ==
- Diospolis (Bithynia), in Bithynia, Anatolia
- Diospolis (Lydia), in Lydia, Anatolia
- Diospolis (Pontus), in Pontus, Anatolia
- Diospolis, later Byzantine Lydda, now Lod in modern Israel
  - Synod of Diospolis in above Lydda
- The first known name of Laodicea on the Lycus in Phrygia, Anatolia

== Egypt ==
- Diospolis Magna (Great Zeus-City), the Greco-Roman name of Pharaonic Thebes
- Diospolis Parva (Little Zeus-City) or Diospolis Superior, the Greco-Roman names of Pharaonic Hiw
- Dispolis Inferior (Lower Zeus-City), the Greco-Roman name of Pharaonic Paiuenamun

== Europe ==
- Diospolis in Thracia, a city and bishopric in Thrace, now in Bulgaria
