= Diocese of Agen =

Catholic diocese in France

Coordinates: 44°12′25″N 0°37′10″E

Diocese of Agen Dioecesis Agennensis Diocèse d'Agen

Catholic
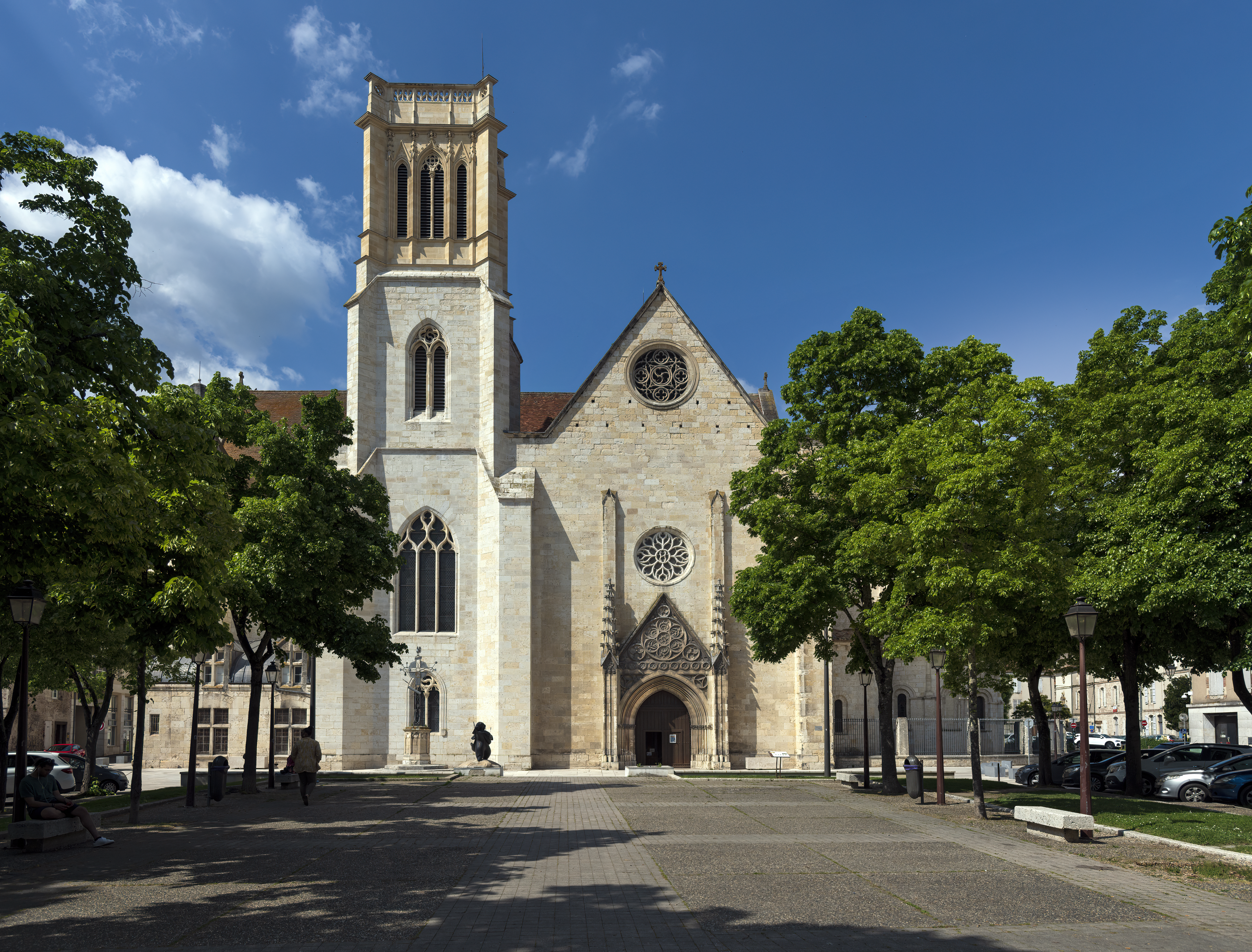
- Agen Cathedral

Location
- Country: France
- Ecclesiastical province: Bordeaux
- Metropolitan: Archdiocese of Bordeaux

Statistics
- Area: 5,384 km^{2} (2,079 sq mi)
- Population: Total; Catholics: (as of 2022); 342,700 ▲ (est.); 205,300 (est.)
- Parishes: 26 ▼

Information
- Denomination: Catholic Church
- Sui iuris church: Latin Church
- Rite: Roman Rite
- Established: 4th Century
- Cathedral: Cathedral of Saint Caprais of Agen
- Deacon and Martyr: Saint Stephen
- Secular priests: 46 (diocesan); 24 (Religious Orders); 14 Permanent Deacons ▼

Current leadership
- Pope: Leo XIV
- Bishop: Alexandre de Bucy
- Metropolitan Archbishop: Jean-Paul André Denis Marcel James
- Apostolic Administrator: Pierre-Marie Joseph Carré
- Bishops emeritus: Hubert Herbreteau

Map

Website
- catholique-agen.cef.fr

The Diocese of Agen (Latin: Dioecesis Agennensis; French: Diocèse d'Agen) is a Latin Church ecclesiastical territory or diocese of the Catholic Church in France.

The Diocese of Agen comprises the département of Lot-et-Garonne, in the région of Aquitaine. It has been successively suffragan to the Archdioceses of Bordeaux (under the old regime), Toulouse (1802–1822), and Bordeaux again (since 1822).

== History ==
Legends which do not antedate the ninth century concerning Saint Caprasius, martyred with St. Fides by Dacianus, Prefect of the Gauls, during the persecution of Diocletian, and the story of Vincentius, a Christian martyr (written about 520), furnish no foundation for later traditions which make these two saints early bishops of Agen.

=== Cathedral ===
The Agen Cathedral was formerly located in the church of St. Caprasius, outside the walls of the Roman town. In its reconstructed state, it serves as a specimen of Romanesque architecture, dating from the Twelfth and Thirteenth Centuries. With the restoration of the diocese in 1802, it was again made the cathedral, in place of the Cathedral of St. Étienne, which had been destroyed during the French Revolution.

=== The chapter of the cathedral ===
The trend in the medieval period was for the chapter to acquire more and more of a right, and then an exclusive right, to elect the bishop of the diocese, to the gradual exclusion of the rest of the clergy and the people. This development, however, was often retarded or impeded by other considerations. In the Agennais in the early medieval period, it was the duke of Aquitaine rather than the canons who had the decisive voice in the choosing of a bishop. This can be inferred from the charter granted in 1135 by King Louis VII, the husband of Eleanor of Aquitaine, which restored to the canons of the chapter of Saint-Étienne the freedom to elect a bishop of their choice. When the popes took up residence in Avignon, Clement V reserved to himself the right to appoint bishops for all the dioceses in France.

During the Great Schism, both the Pope in Rome and the Pope in Avignon appointed bishops of Agen, but since Agen and France supported the Popes in Avignon, it was their appointees who received the temporal rights from the king and were installed in the diocese.

In 1516, King Francis I signed at treaty with Pope Leo X, which has come to be called the Concordat of Bologna, in which the King and his successors acquired the right to nominate each and every one of the bishops in France, except those of the dioceses of Metz, Toul and Verdun. The Popes reserved the right to approve (preconise) the selection of the king, and sometimes they declined the nominee. This arrangement lasted, except for the decade (1790–1801) of the French Revolution, down until the Law of the Separation of the Churches and the State of 1905. Thereafter, the popes assumed the sole right to appoint bishops, though the official terminology is still "elect".

=== Composition ===
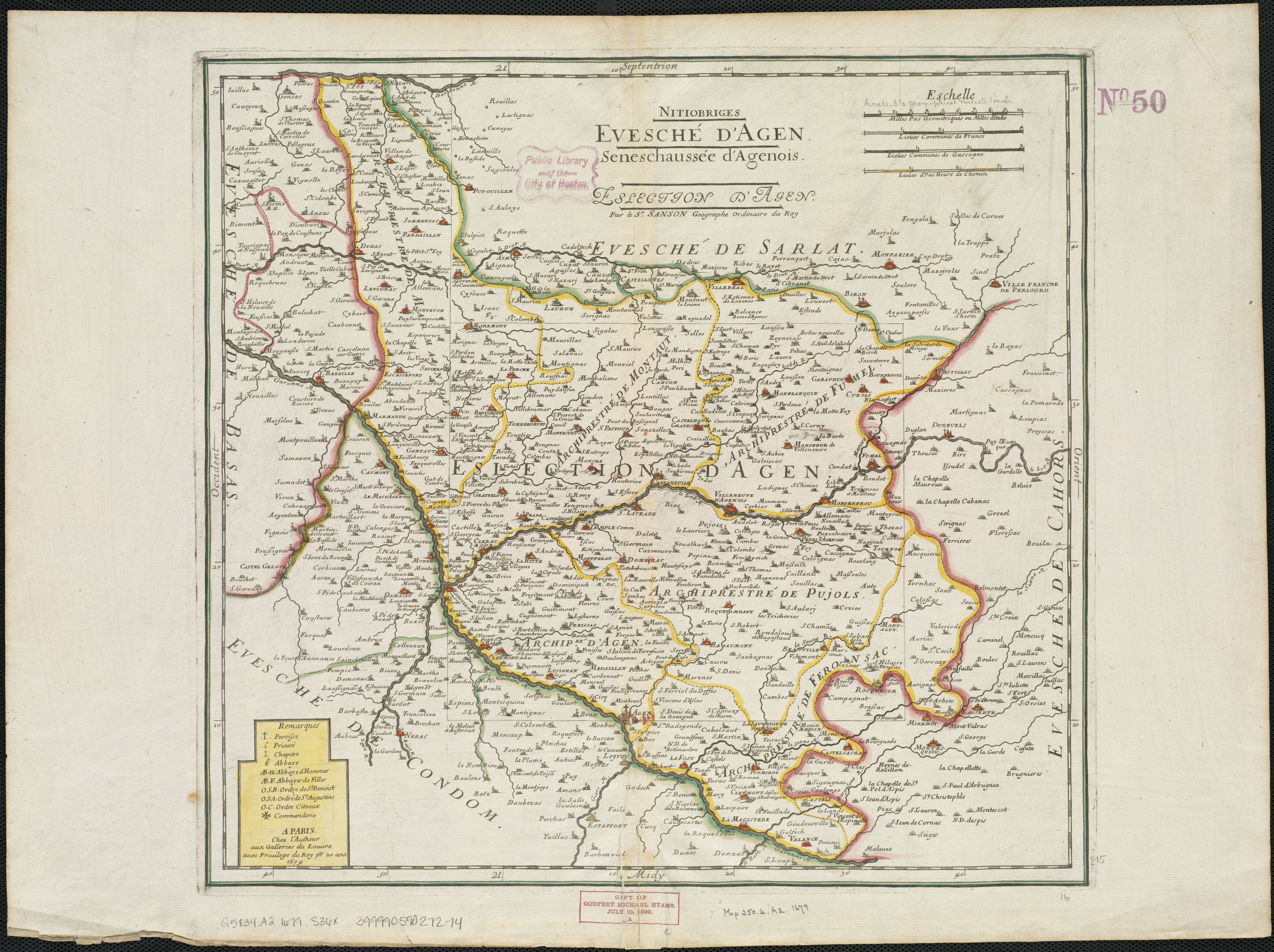
Map of the Diocese of Agen by Nicolas Sanson, dated 1679

The cathedral chapter was composed of twelve canons and several dignities (not dignitaries). The major dignities were the grand archdeacon and the precentor. The minor dignitaries included the other two archdeacons (Monclar and Marmonde), the sacristan, the porter, and the cantor. The office of cantor was suppressed by Cardinal Leonardo Grosso della Rovere (1487–1519), but was restored by Bishop Antonio della Rovere (1519–1538); it was suppressed a second time, and again restored by Bishop Nicolas de Villars (1587–1608).

The cathedral chapter, and the chapters of all cathedrals and Collegiate churches in France, were abolished by the National Assembly in 1790. The cathedral chapter of Agen was reestablished in the Church of Saint-Caprais by Bishop Jean Jacoupy in 1802, by virtue of an apostolic brief of 10 November 1802. It was composed of 10 canons, the first two of whom were vicars-general of the diocese.

=== The election of 1477 ===
The last occasion on which the chapter attempted to assert its traditional right to elect the bishop occurred after the death of Bishop Pierre de Bérard on 21 July 1477. The chapter proceeded to the election, and chose Pierre Dubois, canon and cantor of the cathedral chapter of Saint-André in Bordeaux, and he was presented to the archbishop for confirmation. But on 29 September 1477, King Louis XI wrote to the chapter, announcing that he had named Jean de Monchenu to the bishopric of Agen, relying no doubt on the Pragmatic Sanction of Bourges (1438). Pope Sixtus IV, however, in a bull dated 4 October 1477, appointed his nephew Galeotto Grosso della Rovere as Bishop of Agen. On 29 December 1477 he issued another bull, confirming the resignation of Bishop-elect Pierre Dubois, and at the end of the year documents in the diocese were being issued sede episcopali vacante. Then on 3 July 1478 Monchenu was transferred, while still bishop-elect of Agen, to the diocese of Viviers, thereby extinguishing his claim on Agen, and on 5 July 1478 Sixtus IV issued yet another bull again naming Galeotto Grosso della Rovere to the diocese of Agen. The matter seemed to be settled.

But on 14 November 1478, Pierre Dubois retracted his resignation, and on 9 April 1479, King Louis referred the entire matter, first to the Parlement of Bordeaux, and then to the Royal Council. On 9 September 1480 Pierre Dubois again submitted his resignation, which, on 17 March 1483 he again retracted. The result was a ten-year-long schism in the diocese of Agen, which was finally ended by the final resignation of all his rights by Pierre Dubois on 25 January 1487, and the death of Galeatto Grosso.

=== Chapter of Saint-Caprais ===
Tradition has it that the chapter of Saint-Caprais came into a separate existence when the remains of Saint-Caprais were moved inside the city to the new Cathedral of Saint-Étienne; some of the canons of the old Cathedral of Saint-Caprais moved to Saint-Étienne, while others preferred to stay behind in their accustomed place, where there was plenty of income to sustain them and where they could maintain their prerogatives and preeminence. There is no documentary evidence whatever to sustain this hypothesis for the existence of two chapters. The earliest document, in fact, that refers to the chapter of Saint-Caprais is a charter of 1180 in which the English king Henry II orders the chapter of Saint-Étienne not to harass the chapter of Saint-Caprais economically. There is also a tradition that both chapters were originally composed of regular clergy (monks). There is no evidence for this claim, and indeed in the absence of evidence it is argued by some that the monks were Benedictines, other that they were regular canons, following the Rule of Saint Augustine. What is certain is that the canons were secular canons, not regular canons, by the end of the 13th century.

The chapter of Saint-Caprais had only one dignity, the prior, and a varying number of canons. By 1311 they numbered fifteen, though Pope Martin V in 1417 ordered that they be reduced to twelve, though the actual number of canons was ten, to which the prior was added. Each of the canons was elected by the members of the chapter (in other words, the body coopted its own members, without outside influence), and the prior was elected by the canons. In both the old and the new cathedral, the prior enjoyed the first place in precedence after the bishop, even ahead of the dignities and canons of Saint-Étienne. The canons of Saint-Caprais had no role in the election of a bishop.

=== Chapter of Poujols ===
In 1526, Jean d'Esclamals, seigneur de Poujols, and his wife, Catherine de Lévis, in cooperation with the chapter of Saint-Caprais, founded a chapter of canons for whom a church was built, Notre-Dame et Saint-Pierre de Pujols. The bull of creation was signed by Pope Clement VII on 7 September 1526, and it required that the canons reside and perform all of the liturgical offices; the Seigneur, however, was given the right to reduce the requirements, given the needs of the day. By the 18th century none of the canons resided. Originally there was a dean and ten canons, but the revenues were inadequate, and the number was reduced to six. The parish priest of Saint-Colombe de Pujols was a canon ex officio. The chapter of Poujols had precedence in diocesan synods immediately after the chapter of Saint-Caprais.

== Revolution ==
During the French Revolution the diocese of Agen was suppressed by the Legislative Assembly, under the Civil Constitution of the Clergy (1790). Its territory was subsumed into the new diocese, called 'Lot-et-Garonne', which was coterminous with the new civil department of the same name. Lot-et-Garonne was made part of the Metropolitanate called the 'Métropole du Sud-Ouest'.

The new Civil Constitution mandated that bishops be elected by the citizens of each 'département', The salaries were paid out of funds realized from the confiscation and sale of church properties. After the Concordat of 1801, bishops and priests continued to be salaried and pensioned by the State, down to the Law of Separation of 1905, Article 2.

This system immediately raised the most severe issues in canon law, since the electors did not need to be Catholics and the approval of the Pope was not only not required, but actually forbidden. Erection of new dioceses and transfer of bishops, moreover, was not canonically in the competence of civil authorities or of the Church in France. The result was schism between the 'Constitutional Church' and the Roman Catholic Church.

Since the legitimate bishop of Agen, Jean-Louis de Bonnac, had refused to take the oath to the Constitution, his seat was declared vacant, and an election was ordered. The carefully chosen electors of Lot-et-Garonne met, and on 13 March 1791 chose the Lazarist priest Labarthe, who was the director of the local seminary as their Constitutional bishop. Four days later he declined the election. On 18 March the majority of electors chose Jean-Baptiste Gobel, but he was also elected by the electors of Paris, and he accepted their offer. The electors of Lot-and-Garonne then seemed prepared to pick the titular bishop of Babylon, Jean-Baptiste Dubourg-Miroudot, but Andre Constant, a Dominican professor of theology from Bordeaux, had his name put forward by the Société des Amis de la Constitution. Constant was elected over Miroudot by 232 to 137. Constant resigned in 1801; Bonnac was dismissed by Pius VII in 1801. The diocese of Lot-et-Garonne was likewise abolished, and the diocese of Agen reestablished by papal bull.

== Bishops ==
=== to 1200 ===
[c. 303?: Caprasius of Agen (?)]
[c. 313: Vincent (?)]
[Auxibius (?)]

- c. 359–392: Phoebadius
- c. 400: Dulcidius

[Lupus (?)]

- c. 549: Baebianus
- c. 573: Polemius
- c. 580: Sugillarius
- c. 585: Antidius
- c. 615: Flavardus
- c. 627: Asodoaldus
- c. 630: Sallustius
- c. 642: Sebastianus
- c. 673: Siboaldus

...
[c. 850: Concordius]
...
[c. 977: Gombaud]
[c. 982: Arnaud I.]

- c. 1000: Hugo

[Sanctius]

- Simon I.

[Arénat (?)]
[Adebert (?)]

- Arnaud II. de Beauville
- c. 1049: Bernard I. de Beauville
- Osius (?)
- Regino (?)
- c. 1061: Wilhelm I.
- Arnaud III.
- c. 1080: Donaldus
- c. 1083: Elie I. (?)
- c. 1083: Simon II.
- c. 1101?: Géraud I.
- c. 1105: Isarad
- c. 1105: Gausbert
- c. 1118–1128: Aldebert
- 1128–1149: Raymond-Bernard du Fossat
- c. 1149: Elie II. de Castillon
- c. 1180: Peter I.
- c. 1182: Bertrand I. de Béceyras

=== from 1200 to 1500 ===
- 1209–1228: Arnaud IV. de Rovinha
- 1228–1230/31: Arnaud V.
- 1231–1232: Géraud II. guillau
- 1232–1235: Raoul de Peyrinis
- 1235–1245: Arnaud VI. de Galard
- 1245–1247: Pierre de Reims, O.P.
- 1247–1262: Guillaume II
- 1263–1264: Guillaume III
- 1264–1271: Pierre Jerlandi
- 1271–1281: Arnaud de Got
- 1281–1291: Jean Jerlandi
- 1291–1306: Bertrand de Got
- 1306: Bernard II. de Fargis
- 1306–1313: Bertrand de Got
- 1313–1357: Amanieu de Fargis
- 1357–1363: Déodat de Rotbald
- 1364–1374: Raymond de Salg

[c. 1367: Richard (?)]

- 1375–1382: Jean II. Belveti

[c. 1379: Jean III.]

- 1382–1383: Simon de Cramaud (Avignon Obedience)
- 1383–1395: Jean IV. (Avignon Obedience)
- 1395–1398: Bernard III. Chevenon (Avignon Obedience)
- 1398–1438: Imbert de Saint-Laurent (Avignon Obedience)
- 1439–1461: Jean V. Borgia
- 1461–1477: Pierre IV. de Bérard

[1477: Jean VI. de Monchenu]

- 1478–1487: Galeotto Grosso della Rovere
- 1487–1519: Cardinal Leonardo Grosso della Rovere

=== from 1500 to 1800 ===
- 1519–1538: Antonio della Rovere
- 1538–1550: Cardinal Jean de Lorraine (Administrator)
- 1550–1554: Matteo Bandello, O.P.
- 1555–1586: Janus Fregoso

[1586–1587: Pierre Donault, O.S.B.Clun.]

- 1587–1608: Nicolas de Villars
- 1609–1630: Claude de Gélas
- 1631–1636: Gaspard de Daillon du Lude
- 1636–1663: Barthélémi d'Elbène
- 1665–1678: Claude Joly
- 1680–1703: Jules Mascaron, Oratorian
- c. 1703: François Hébert, (fr)
- 1729–1735: Jean d'Yse de Saléon, (fr)
- 1735–1767: Jean-Gaspard-Gilbert de Chabannes, (fr)
- 1768–1801: Jean-Louis d'Usson de Bonnac, (fr)
- 1791–1801: André Constant (Constitutional Bishop)

=== since 1800 ===
- 1802–1840: Jean Jacoupy (fr)
- 1841–1867: Jean-Aimé de Levezou de Vezins (fr)

(1867–1871): Sede Vacante

- 1871–1874: Hector-Albert Chaulet d'Outremont (fr)
- 1874–1884: Jean-Emile Fonteneau (fr)
- 1884–1905: Charles-Evariste-Joseph Coeuret-Varin (fr)
- 1906–1937: Charles-Paul Sagot du Vauroux (fr)
- 1938–1956: Jean-Marcel Rodié (fr)
- 1956–1976: Roger Johan
- 1976–1996: Sabin Saint-Gaudens (fr)
- 1996–2004: Jean-Charles Descubes (fr)
- 2005–2023: Hubert Herbreteau (fr)
- 2024–present: Alexandre de Bucy (pl)

== See also ==
- Catholic Church in France
- List of Catholic dioceses in France

== Bibliography ==
=== Reference books ===
- Gams, Pius Bonifatius (1873). Series episcoporum Ecclesiae catholicae: quotquot innotuerunt a beato Petro apostolo. Ratisbon: Typis et Sumptibus Georgii Josephi Manz. pp. 479–480. (Use with caution; obsolete)
- Eubel, Conradus, ed. (1913). Hierarchia catholica, Tomus 1 (second ed.). Münster: Libreria Regensbergiana. pp. 76–77. (in Latin)
- Eubel, Conradus, ed. (1914). Hierarchia catholica, Tomus 2 (second ed.). Münster: Libreria Regensbergiana. p. .
- Gulik, Guilelmus (1923). Eubel, Conradus (ed.). Hierarchia catholica, Tomus 3 (second ed.). Münster: Libreria Regensbergiana. p. .
- Gauchat, Patritius (Patrice) (1935). Hierarchia catholica IV (1592–1667). Münster: Libraria Regensbergiana. p. .
- Ritzler, Remigius; Sefrin, Pirminus (1952). Hierarchia catholica medii et recentis aevi V (1667–1730). Patavii: Messagero di S. Antonio. p. .
- Ritzler, Remigius; Sefrin, Pirminus (1958). Hierarchia catholica medii et recentis aevi VI (1730–1799). Patavii: Messagero di S. Antonio. pp. .
- Ritzler, Remigius; Sefrin, Pirminus (1968). Hierarchia Catholica medii et recentioris aevi sive summorum pontificum, S. R. E. cardinalium, ecclesiarum antistitum series... A pontificatu Pii PP. VII (1800) usque ad pontificatum Gregorii PP. XVI (1846) (in Latin). Vol. VII. Monasterii: Libr. Regensburgiana.
- Remigius Ritzler; Pirminus Sefrin (1978). Hierarchia catholica Medii et recentioris aevi... A Pontificatu PII PP. IX (1846) usque ad Pontificatum Leonis PP. XIII (1903) (in Latin). Vol. VIII. Il Messaggero di S. Antonio.
- Pięta, Zenon (2002). Hierarchia catholica medii et recentioris aevi... A pontificatu Pii PP. X (1903) usque ad pontificatum Benedictii PP. XV (1922) (in Latin). Vol. IX. Padua: Messagero di San Antonio. ISBN 978-88-250-1000-8.
- Sainte-Marthe, Denis de (1720). Gallia Christiana: In Provincias Ecclesiasticas Distributa... Provinciae Burdigalensis, Bituricensis (in Latin). Vol. Tomus secundus. Paris: Typographia Regia. pp. 892–954, Instrumenta pp. 427–438.

=== Studies ===
- Barrère, Joseph (1855). Histoire religieuse & monumentale de diocèse d'Agen (in French). Vol. Tome I. Agen: A. Chairou.
- Barrère, Joseph (1856). Histoire religieuse & monumentale de diocèse d'Agen (in French). Vol. Tome II. Agen: A. Chairou.
- Combes, P. (abbé) (1885). Les évêques d'Agen: essai historique (in French). Agen.
- Duchesne, Louis (1910). Fastes épiscopaux de l'ancienne Gaule, vol. II, deuxième édition, Paris 1910; pp. 68–69 and 142–146.
- Durengues, A. (1894). L'eglise d'Agen sous l'ancien regime: pouillé historique du Diocèse d'Agen pour l'année 1789 (in French). Agen: Ferran Frères.
- Du Tems, Hugues (1774). Le clergé de France (in French). Vol. Tome second. Brunet. pp. 268–299.
- Jean, Armand (1891). Les évêques et les archevêques de France depuis 1682 jusqu'à 1801 (in French). Paris: A. Picard. pp. 454–458.
- Pisani, Paul (1907). Répertoire biographique de l'épiscopat constitutionnel (1791–1802) (in French). Paris: A. Picard et fils.
- Ryckebusch, Fabrice (2001). Diocèse d'Agen (in French). Turnhout: Brepols. ISBN 978-2-503-51009-5.
- Ryckebusch, Fabrice (ed.) (2001): Fasti Ecclesiae Gallicanae. Répertoire prosopographique des évêques, dignitaires et chanoines des diocèses de France de 1200 à 1500. V. Diocèse d’Agen. Turnhout, Brepols. (in French)
- Société bibliographique (France) (1907). L'épiscopat français depuis le Concordat jusqu'à la Séparation (1802–1905). Paris: Librairie des Saints-Pères.

Attribution
