= Pope Urban IV =

Head of the Catholic Church from 1261 to 1264

- Bishop of Rome
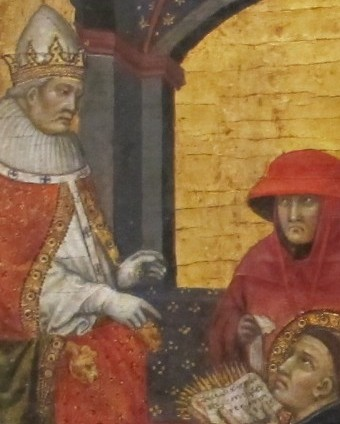
- Saint Thomas Aquinas Submitting His Office of Corpus Domini to Pope Urban IV(left) by Taddeo Bartolo, c. 1403
- Church: Catholic Church
- Papacy began: 29 August 1261
- Papacy ended: 2 October 1264
- Predecessor: Alexander IV
- Successor: Clement IV
- Previous posts: Bishop of Verdun (1253–1255); Latin Patriarch of Jerusalem (1255–1261)

Orders
- Consecration: 4 September 1261

Personal details
- Born: Jacques Pantaléon c. 1195 Troyes, Champagne, Kingdom of France
- Died: 2 October 1264 (aged 68–69) Perugia, Papal States
- Coat of arms: Urban IV's coat of arms

Ordination history of Pope Urban IV
Episcopal succession
Bishops consecrated by Pope Urban IV as principal consecrator
- Archbishop Leonardo: 28 December 1261
- Ottone Visconti: 22 July 1262
- John Gervais (Gernsay): 10 September 1262
- Engelbert von Falkenburg: 31 December 1262
- Bishop Guillaume, O.F.M.: ?? ???? 1263
- Archbishop Maurin: ?? ???? 1263
- Bishop Thurgot: 13 January 1264
- Guillaume de La Roue, O.S.B.: 22 February 1264
- Benvenuto Scotivoli: ?? ???? 1264

Pope Urban IV (Latin: Urbanus; c. 1195 – 2 October 1264), born James Pantaleon (French: Jacques Pantaléon), was head of the Catholic Church and ruler of the Papal States from 29 August 1261 to his death three years later. He was elected pope without being a cardinal; he was the first to be elected in such a way, and this would occur for only 5 more popes afterwards (Gregory X, Celestine V, Clement V, Urban V, and Urban VI).

== Early career ==
Pantaléon was the son of a cobbler of Troyes, France. He studied theology and common law in Paris and was appointed a canon of Laon and later Archdeacon of Liège. At the First Council of Lyon (1245), he attracted the attention of Pope Innocent IV, who sent him twice on missions to Germany. In one of these missions, he negotiated the Treaty of Christburg between the pagan Prussians and the Teutonic Knights. He became Bishop of Verdun in 1253. In 1255, Pope Alexander IV made him Latin Patriarch of Jerusalem.

Pantaléon returned from Jerusalem, which was in dire straits, and was at Viterbo seeking help for the oppressed Christians in the East when Alexander IV died. After a three-month vacancy, the eight cardinals of the Sacred College chose him to succeed Alexander IV in a papal election on 29 August 1261. He chose the regnal name of Urban IV, and was crowned in the church of Santa Maria a Gradi on September 4.

== Pontificate ==
A month before Urban's election, the Latin Empire of Constantinople, founded during the ill-fated Fourth Crusade against the Byzantines, fell to the Byzantines led by Emperor Michael VIII Palaiologos. Urban IV endeavoured without success to stir up a crusade to restore the Latin Empire. Georgius Pachymeres reports that Urban flayed one of Michael's envoys alive.

Urban initiated the construction of the Basilica of St. Urbain, Troyes, in 1262.

He instituted the feast of Corpus Christi ("the Body of Christ") on 11 August 1264, with the publication of the papal bull Transiturus. Urban asked Thomas Aquinas, the Dominican theologian, to write the texts for the Mass and Office of the feast. This included such famous hymns as the Pange lingua, Tantum ergo, and Panis angelicus.

Urban became involved in the affairs of Denmark. Jakob Erlandsen, Archbishop of Lund, wanted to make the Danish Church independent of royal power, which put him at odds with King Christopher I; this eventually lead to the king's imprisonment of the archbishop, and the archbishop's issuance of an interdict in response. Both sides sought the Pope's support. Upon the king's death, the Dowager Queen Margaret Sambiria—acting as regent for her son, King Eric V of Denmark—released Erlandsen, after the Pope agreed to issue a dispensation to alter the terms of Danish succession such that women would be allowed to inherit the throne. However, the main reasons for the conflict remained unsolved by Urban's death, with the exiled Archbishop Erlandsen come personally to Italy seeking a solution, and the case continuing at the papal court in Rome.

However, the convoluted affairs of Denmark were a minor concern to the Pope. His attention was focussed on Italian affairs. During the previous pontificate, the long confrontation between the pope and the late Hohenstaufen German Emperor Frederick II had fed clashes between cities dominated by pro-Imperial Ghibellines and those dominated by pro-papal Guelf factions. Frederick II's heir Manfred was absorbed in these confrontations.

Urban's military captain was the condottiere Azzo d'Este, who led a loose league of cities including Mantua and Ferrara. The Hohenstaufen in Sicily had claims over the cities of Lombardy. To counter the influence of Manfred, Urban supported Charles of Anjou in seizing the Kingdom of Sicily, because he was amenable to papal control. Charles was Count of Provence due to marriage and was very powerful.

Urban negotiated with Manfred over two years to seek his support to regain Constantinople in exchange for the papal recognition of his Kingdom. At the same time, the pope promised ships and men to Charles through a crusading tithe. In exchange, Charles's promised not to lay claims on Imperial lands in northern Italy, nor in the Papal States. Charles also promised to restore the annual census or feudal tribute due to the Pope as overlord, some 10,000 ounces of gold being agreed upon, while the Pope would work to block Conradin's election to King of the Germans.

Urban IV died in Perugia on 2 October 1264, before Charles' arrival in Italy. His successor, Pope Clement IV, provided continuity to his agreements.

== Legend of Tannhäuser ==
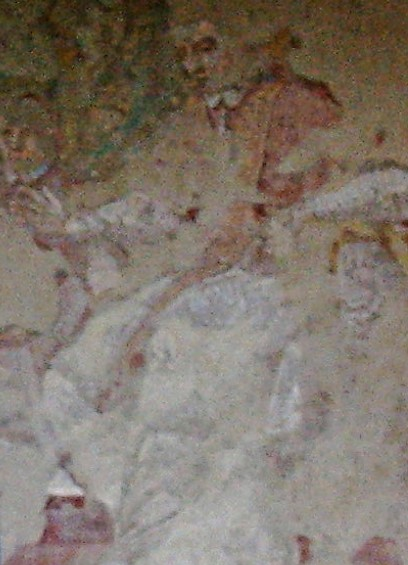
Fresco of Urban at Santa Maria Novella, Florence, made c. 1366

Tannhäuser, a prominent German Minnesänger and poet, was a contemporary of Urban. Two centuries after the respective deaths, Pope Urban IV became a major character in a legend about the Minnesänger, which was first attested to exist in 1430 and became established in ballads from 1450.

According to this account, Tannhäuser was a knight and poet who discovered Venusberg, the underground home of Venus, and spent a year there worshipping the goddess. After leaving Venusberg, Tannhäuser was filled with remorse and traveled to Rome seeking Pope Urban IV's absolution of his sins. Urban replied that forgiving him would be as impossible as the papal staff growing leaves. Three days after Tannhäuser's departure, Urban's staff began growing leaves. The pope sent messengers seeking the knight, but he had already returned to Venusberg, never to be seen again.

== See also ==
- Cardinals created by Urban IV
- List of popes
- Exultavit cor nostrum

== Notes ==
Catholic Church titles
Preceded by Robert of Nantes	Latin Patriarch of Jerusalem; 1255–1261	Succeeded by William II of Agen
Preceded by Alexander IV	Pope; 1261–1264	Succeeded by Clement IV
