= Diocese of Bethlehem in the Holy Land =

Catholic titular see in Palestine

Coordinates: 31.7031°N 35.1956°E

The See or Diocese of Bethlehem was a diocese in the Catholic Church during the Crusades and is now a titular see.

== History ==
=== In Bethlehem ===
In 1099 Bethlehem was conquered by Catholic forces in the First Crusade. A new monastery and cloister were built by the Augustinians to the north of the Church of the Nativity, with a tower to the south and an episcopal palace to the west. The Orthodox clergy (the Christian presence in the area had until then been Greek Orthodox) were ejected and replaced by Catholic clergy. On his birthday in 1100, Baldwin I was crowned king of Jerusalem in Bethlehem — that same year, at Baldwin's request, Pope Paschal II established Bethlehem (never before an episcopal see) as a Catholic bishopric, a suffragan of the Latin Patriarch of Jerusalem.

In 1187 the Ayyubid Sultan Saladin (of Egypt, Syria and more in the Levant) conquered Bethlehem and the Catholic clergy was forced to let the Greek Orthodox clergy return. Saladin himself in 1192 allowed two Catholic priests and two deacons to return to the diocese, though Bethlehem's economy still suffered from the drastic reduction in pilgrims from Europe.

=== Interior exile ===
In 1223, the bishopric was suppressed as a residential see in the Holy Land, being truly in partibus infidelium, yet was not made a regular titular see but transferred as a residential bishopric in French exile: the Diocese of Bethléem à Clamecy with a tiny territory in Burgundy, see below - rare but not unique, compare the Archbishopric of Nazareth, fellow crusader see in southern Italian exile (at Barletta in Apulia, southern Italy).

In 1229 Bethlehem, Jerusalem, Nazareth and Sidon briefly returned to the Kingdom of Jerusalem under a treaty between Emperor Frederick II and the Ayyubid Sultan Al-Kamil, in exchange for a ten-year truce between the Ayyubids and the Crusaders. That treaty expired in 1239 and Bethlehem was then reconquered by the Muslims in 1244.

In 1250, with the Mamluks' risen to power, tolerance for Christians in Palestine declined — the Catholic clergy left Bethlehem, whose walls were demolished in 1263. The Catholics then returned to Bethlehem only in the 14th century and settled in the monastery adjacent to the Church of the Nativity. The Greek Orthodox in the meantime took over control of the Church of the Nativity and shared control of the Milk Grotto with the Catholics and the Armenians.

=== Residential bishops of Bethlehem in Palestine ===
- Aschetinus (1110 – after 1123)
- Anselm (before 1132 – after 1142)
- Gerald (before 1147 – after 1152)
- Ralph the Englishman I, (1155 – death 1173)
- Albert, (1177 - 1181)
- Ralph II (1186-1192)
- Peter (before 1204 – killed in 1205 at the battle of Adrianopolis)
- Thomas (before 1207–?)
- Rainier (before 1210–1233)
- Tommaso Agni da Lentini, Dominican Order (O.P.), (1258–1263), in 1272 elected Latin patriarch of Jerusalem

=== Exile in Burgundy ===
The crusading William IV, Count of Nevers, dying in the Holy Land in 1168, had left the building known as the Hospital of Panthenor or Pantenor in the town of Clamecy in Burgundy, together with some land, to the bishops of Bethlehem, in case Bethlehem should fall under Muslim control. In 1223, the then bishop of Bethlehem took up residence in his Burgundian property, which remained the seat of residential (nearly titular) Bishops of Bethlehem for almost 600 years, until the French Revolution of 1789.

From 1223, therefore, the 'exiled' Bishops of Bethlehem exercised jurisdiction over the hospital and the faubourg that was their property. Their successors were chosen by the counts, later the dukes of Nevers, with the approval of the pope and the king, although (neighbouring) French bishoprics contested their diocesan legitimity. In 1413, King Charles VI tried to obtain for them the privileges enjoyed by the diocesan bishops of the realm, but because of the opposition of the French clergy they continued to be considered bishops in partibus infidelium. In 1635, the assembly of the French clergy granted them an annual pension. Christopher d'Authier of Sisgau, founder of the Missionary Priests of the Congregation of the Blessed Sacrament and celebrated for his sermons to the galley-slaves of Marseilles, was Bishop of Bethlehem 1651–63.

The immediate aftermath of the French Revolution extinguished the title to property that was once attached to the titular bishopric of Bethlehem, making it like any other of the titular sees listed by the Catholic Church in the Annuario Pontificio.

=== Titular see ===
Circa 1462 the crusader diocese was nominally restored by Rome, alongside Clamecy (which was in obedience to the Antipopes of Avignon), but now as a regular Latin Titular bishopric of Bethlehem (English) / Bethléem (français) / Betlemme (Italiano) / Bethleem (latine) / Bethleemitan(us) (Latin). It had the following incumbents, all of the fitting Episcopal (lowest) rank :

- Giovanni Berratino (1462.09.19 – ?)
- Fabrizio (? – ?)
- Francesco de Carralaris (1468.06.01 – 1471?)
- Cristoforo Amici (1473.02.01 – 1500.07.18)
- Matteo (1506.11.21 – 1511?)
- Antonio de Monte (1517.04.20 – 1517.08.21)
- Cristoforo Guidalotti Ciocchi del Monte (Christophe de Monte) (later Cardinal) (1517.08.21 – 1525.02.10)
- Tommaso Albizzi (1525.02.10 – 1527)
- Leonardo da Vercelli, O.E.S.A. (1534? – ?)
- Luís Soler (1536.04.28 – ?)
- Cristóbal de Arguellada (1550.07.04 – 1572?)
- Mario Bellomo (1585.09.23 – 1593)
- Vincenzo Malatesta (1595.11.20 – 1603.05.02).

Circa 1603 it was suppressed, but in 1840 restored as Titular bishopric of Bethlehem (English) / Bethléem (French) / Betlemme (Curiate Italian) / Bethleem (Latin) / Bethleemitan(us) (Latin), this time however with Apostolic succession to the former 'Burgundy-exiled' Diocese of Bethléem à Clamecy.

The Abbots of the Territorial Abbacy of Saint-Maurice d’Agaune (which has its own Swiss Congregation of Canons Regular, C.S.A.) held the title of Bethlehem from 1840.07.03 to 1970.

It is vacant since 1987, having had the following incumbents, so far all of the fitting Episcopal (lowest) rank :

BIOS TO ELABORATE

- Étienne-Barthélemy Bagnoud, C.R.A. (1840.07.03 – 1888.11.02)
- Joseph Paccolat, C.R.A. (1889.02.05 – 1909.04.04)
- Joseph-Emile Abbet, C.R.A. (1909.07.24 – 1914.08.03)
- Joseph-Tobie Mariétan, C.R.A. (1914.10.15 – 1931.02.08)
- Bernard Alexis Burquier, C.R.A. (1932.08.22 – 1943.03.30)
- Lois-Séverin Haller, C.R.A. (1943.06.26 – 1987.07.17)

== See also ==
- List of Catholic dioceses in Holy Land and Cyprus
- List of Catholic dioceses in France

== Sources and external links ==
- GCatholic
- Bethlehem in Catholic Encyclopedia.

=== Bibliography ===
- (in French) Honoré Fisquet, La France pontificale, histoire chronologique et biographique des archevêques et évêques de tous les diocèses de France. Métropole de Sens. Nevers - Bethléem, Paris, pp. 143–172
- (in French) Charles D. Du Cange; Nicolas Rodolphe Taranne; Emmanuel Guillaume-Rey, Les familles d'outre-mer, Paris, Imprimerie Impériale [1869], pp. 784–93
- Guy le Strange, Palestine Under the Moslems: A Description of Syria and the Holy Land from AD 650 to 1500 Committee of the Palestine Exploration Fund, 1890.
- (in Italian) De Sandoli, Sabino (1974). Corpus Inscriptionum Crucesignatorum Terrae Sanctae. Pubblicazioni dello Studium Biblicum Franciscanum 21:193–237
- Christopher Tyerman, England and the Crusades, 1095–1588, Chicago, University of Chicago Press [1988], 1996. ISBN 0-226-82013-0, ISBN 978-0-226-82013-2
- (in Italian) Bruno Figliuolo, Chiesa e feudalità nei principati latini d'Oriente durante i X–XII secolo in Chiesa e mondo feudale nei secoli X-XII: atti della dodicesima settimana internazionale di studio Mendola, 24–28 Agosto 1992, Vita e Pensiero, 1995. ISBN 978-88-343-1241-4
- Piers Paul Read, The Templars, Macmillan, 2000. ISBN 0-312-26658-8
- Louis de Mas Latrie, Trésor de chronologie d'histoire et de géographie, Paris 1889, coll. 1391-1394
- Paul Riant, L'église de Bethléem et Varazze en Ligurie, in Atti della Società ligure di Storia patria, vol. XVII, 1885, pp. 543–705 (cfr. tabella sinottica dei vescovi p. 641)
- Paul Riant, Études sur l'histoire de l'église de Bethléem, vol. I 1889, vol. II 1896
- Paul Riant, Eclaircissements sur quelques points de l'histoire de l'église de Bethléem-Ascalon, in Revue de l'Orient latin, vol. I, pp. 140–160, 381–412, 475–524; t. II, pp. 35–72
- G. Levenq, lemma 'Bethléem' in Dictionnaire d'Histoire et de Géographie ecclésiastiques, vol. VIII, 1935, coll. 1248-1251
- Pius Bonifacius Gams, Series episcoporum Ecclesiae Catholicae, Leipzig 1931, pp. 516–517
- Konrad Eubel, Hierarchia Catholica Medii Aevi, vol. 1, pp. 134–135; vol. 2, pp. XVI e 105; vol. 3, p. 133; vol. 4, p. 114; vol. 5, p. 119; vol. 6, p. 122
- Papal bulla 'Qui Christi Domini', in Bullarii romani continuatio, vol. XI, Rome 1845, pp. 245–249
- Papal breve 'In amplissimo', in Bullarium pontificium Sacrae congregationis de propaganda fide, vol V, Rome 1841, p. 196
