= Guy of Cyprus =

Guy of Cyprus may refer to:

- Guy of Lusignan (1150–1194), King of Cyprus from 1192 to 1194
- Guy of Ibelin, constable of Cyprus (1215–1255), son of John of Ibelin, the Old Lord of Beirut
- Guy (son of Hugh III of Cyprus) (died 1302), constable of Cyprus, father of Hugh IV of Cyprus
- Guy of Lusignan (died 1343), constable of Cyprus and titular Prince of Galilee

== See also ==
- Officers of the Kingdom of Cyprus
