= Baldwin of Ibelin, bailli of Jerusalem =

Baldwin
- Coat-of-arms of Ibelin.

constable of Cyprus
- Predecessor: Guy, constable of Cyprus
- Successor: Balian, lord of Arsuf
- Born: c. 1245
- Died: 1286/1287
- Noble family: House of Ibelin
- Father: Guy, constable of Cyprus
- Mother: Phillipa, daughter of Aimery Berlais

Baldwin of Ibelin (born c. 1245; died 1286/1287) was a nobleman of the Kingdom of Cyprus. A member of the House of Ibelin, he was a son of Guy, constable of Cyprus, and a brother of Queen Isabella. He was thus the maternal uncle of King Henry II of Cyprus, whom he served as constable of Cyprus.

In 1277, Nicholas Aleman, lord of Caesarea, murdered Baldwin's brother John in a feud. In revenge, Baldwin, by then already constable, killed Nicholas, who happened to be married to a distant cousin, Isabella, daughter of John II of Beirut.

On 24 June 1286, the teen-aged Henry II sailed to claim the Kingdom of Jerusalem. (Note: The kingdom at this stage comprised little more than the royal city of Acre, the Templar lordship of Athlit and Sidon, and the secular lordships of Tyre and Beirut.) The fleet and Henry's knights were under the command of Baldwin. Henry was crowned as King of Jerusalem at Tyre in August and then moved on to Acre. He returned to Cyprus in November, but Baldwin stayed behind as the royal bailiff. (Note: According to the Templar of Tyre, the Chronicle of Amadi and Florio Bustron, Baldwin was the bailiff of Jerusalem who stayed behind. According to Marino Sanudo, it was his brother, Philip of Ibelin. Sanudo is probably mistaken.) He was dead by January 1287, when Henry II endowed masses for his soul in the Cathedral of the Holy Wisdom, Nicosia.
