= Family tree of Kingdom of Jerusalem monarchs =

This a family tree of the kings of Jerusalem.

This diagram lists the rulers of the kingdom of Jerusalem, since the conquest of the city in 1099, during the First Crusade, to 1291, year of the fall of Acre.

(related)
House of Flanders-Boulogne	Godfrey; 1060–1100 r. 1099–1100	Baldwin I 1058–1118 r. 1100–1118	Baldwin II; 1060–1131 r. 1118–1131
House of Rethel	Melisende; 1105–1161 r. 1131–1152	Fulk; 1092–1143 r. 1131–1143
House of Anjou	Baldwin III; 1130–1163 r. 1143–1163	Amalric; 1136–1174 r. 1163–1174
Aleramici	Baldwin IV; 1161–1185 r. 1174–1185	William Longsword; 1140–1177	Sibylla; 1160–1190 r. 1186–1190	Guy; 1150–1194 r. 1186–1190/92	Conrad I 1145–1192 r.1190/1192–1192	Isabella I 1172–1205 r. 1190/92–1205	Henry I 1166–1197 r. 1192–1197	Aimery; 1145–1205 r. 1197–1205	Eschiva of Ibelin
House of Blois-Champagne	Baldwin V 1177–1186 r. 1185–1186	John; 1170–1237 r. 1210–1225	Maria; 1192–1212 r. 1205–1212	Alice; 1195–1246	Hugh I of Cyprus
House of Brienne	Frederick; 1194–1250 r. 1225–1243	Isabella II; 1212–1228 r. 1212–1228	Isabella of Cyprus; 1216–1264
House of Hohenstaufen	Conrad II; 1228–1254 r. 1228–1254	Hugh I 1235–1284 r. 1268–1284
House of Lusignan	Conrad III; 1252–1268 r. 1254–1268	John II; 1267–1285 r. 1284–1285	Henry II; 1270–1324 r. 1285–1291
House of Poitiers-Lusignan

== See also ==
- Crusade
- Kings of Jerusalem
- Kingdom of Jerusalem
- Vassals of the Kingdom of Jerusalem
- Officers of the Kingdom of Jerusalem
- Haute Cour of Jerusalem
- Assizes of Jerusalem
- A 1911 map showing the Kingdom of Jerusalem and the other Crusader states.
