= Philip of Ibelin =

Philip of Ibelin may refer to:

- Philip of Ibelin (1180–1227), nobleman of the Kingdom of Cyprus
- Philip of Ibelin (died 1304)
- Philip of Ibelin (died 1318), Seneschal of the Kingdom of Cyprus
