= Aimery, Constable of Cyprus =

Member of the royal family of Cyprus, Constable of Cyprus from 1303

Aimery of Poitiers-Lusignan (French: Aimery de Lusignan; 1275–1316), was a Cypriot nobleman. He was a member of the House of Poitiers-Lusignan, as he was the son of king Hugh III of Cyprus. He held the position of Constable of Cyprus in 1303.

== Biography ==
Aimery was the fifth son of king Hugh III of Cyprus and his consort Isabella of Ibelin.

His brother Henry II, king of Cyprus and Jerusalem, appointed him Constable of Cyprus in 1303. In 1306, he took part in a plot orchestrated by his brother Amalric to overthrow Henry II. Aimery, together with Amalric, Guy of Ibelin and Hugh of Ibelin and other knights appeared at the royal palace where they demanded that Henry II, whose administration had become unpopular in Cyprus and who was also ill, resign from the throne and establish a regency government under the command of Amalric. Due to his lack of followers, the King was forced to abdicate and was confined to his villa of Strovolos.

Although Amalric's government was initially popular, it soon became unpopular due to the arrest and murder of several members of significant Cypriot noble families. These events would lead to the assassination of the regent at the hands of the noble, Simon of Montolif on 5 June 1310. Aimery was appointed regent after his brother's death, but the King, having returned from exile in August of that year, defeated Aimery and ordered his arrest, as well as the arrest of the others rebellious nobles.

Aimery died in the prison of Kyrenia in 1316. He is not known to have married or had children.
