= Officers of the Kingdom of Cyprus =

The Kingdom of Cyprus, as an offshoot of the Kingdom of Jerusalem, maintained many of the same offices, such as: seneschal, constable, marshal, admiral, Chamberlain, and chancellor.

== Seneschal ==
- Guy de Lusignan (c. 1195), son of King Aimery of Cyprus
- Aimery de Rivet (1197–1210)
- Baldwin of Ibelin (1246–1267)
- Robert de Cresque (1269)
- Balian of Ibelin (1286–1302)
- Philip of Ibelin (1302–1318), brother of Balian of Ibelin
- Guy of Ibelin (1318 – after 1334?), son of Philip of Ibelin
- James of Lusignan (1369)

== Constable ==
- Aimery of Lusignan (before 1194)
- John of Lusignan
- Baldwin of Bethsan (c. 1195)
- Guy of Ibelin
- Walter III of Caesarea (c. 1206)
- John, Old Lord of Beirut (c. 1227 – 1229)
- John of Arsuf (c. 1247), son of John, Old Lord of Beirut
- Guy of Ibelin (c. 1250), John of Arsuf
- Baldwin of Ibelin, son of Guy of Ibelin
- Balian of Arsuf, (c. 1276), son of John of Arsuf
- John of Lusignan (before 1284), later John I
- Guy (c. 1291), son of Hugh III
- Philip of Ibelin (c. 1302), son of Baldwin of Ibelin, Seneschal of Cyprus
- Amalric, Lord of Tyre (c. 1303), brother of Guy
- Hugh of Lusignan (c. 1318), son of Guy, later Hugh IV
- Honfroy of Montfort (before 1326)
- Guy of Lusignan, (c. 1336 – 1338), son of Hugh IV
- Peter of Lusignan (soon after 1343, assumed), son of Hugh IV, later Peter I
- James of Lusignan (after 1369), son of Hugh IV, later James I
- Philip of Lusignan, son of James I
- Guy of Lusignan, brother of Philip of Lusignan

== Marshal ==
- Hugh Martin (1194–1196)
- Renaud de Soissons (1210–1217)
- Adam de Gaures of Antioch
- John of Antioch (1247), son of Adam de Gaures of Antioch
- Anceau
- William de Canet (1269)
- Simon de Montolif
- Thomas de Montolif (1328)
- Daniël van de Merwede (1361)

== Admiral ==
- Johann of Brunswick-Grubenhagen (died 11 June 1414)
- Garceran Suárez de los Cernadilla (1432 – after 1458)

== Chamberlain ==
- Amaury de Bethsan (1218–1220)
- Geoffrey le Tor (1247)
- Philip de Cassie (1269)
- Walter of Antioch (1286)

== Chancellor ==
- Peter of Angoulême, under Guy of Lusignan
- Alan (1195–1201), archdeacon of Lydda and archbishop of Nicosia
- Ralph (1217–1220), archdeacon of Nicosia
- Bonvassal d'Aude (1231–1248), canon of Nicosia
- Peter (1269–1288), bishop of Paphos
- Henry de Gibelet (1291–1330), archdeacon of Nicosia

== Butler ==
The office of butler was created in 1328.

== See also ==
- Officers of the County of Edessa
- Officers of the County of Tripoli
- Officers of the Kingdom of Jerusalem
- Officers of the Principality of Antioch
