= Guy of Lusignan (disambiguation) =

Guy of Lusignan may refer to:

- Guy of Lusignan (c. 1150–1194), King of Jerusalem (1186–1192)
- Guy de Lusignan, Lord of Cognac (fl. 1242–1288)
- Guy (son of Hugh III of Cyprus) (died 1303), constable of Cyprus, father of Hugh IV
- Guy of Lusignan, Count of Angoulême (c. 1260–1308), Count of Angoulême and La Marche
- Guy of Lusignan (died 1343), constable of Cyprus, son of Hugh IV of Cyprus
- Constantine II, King of Armenia (died 1344), born Guy de Lusignan, son of Amalric, Lord of Tyre
