= Qaba =

Long gown

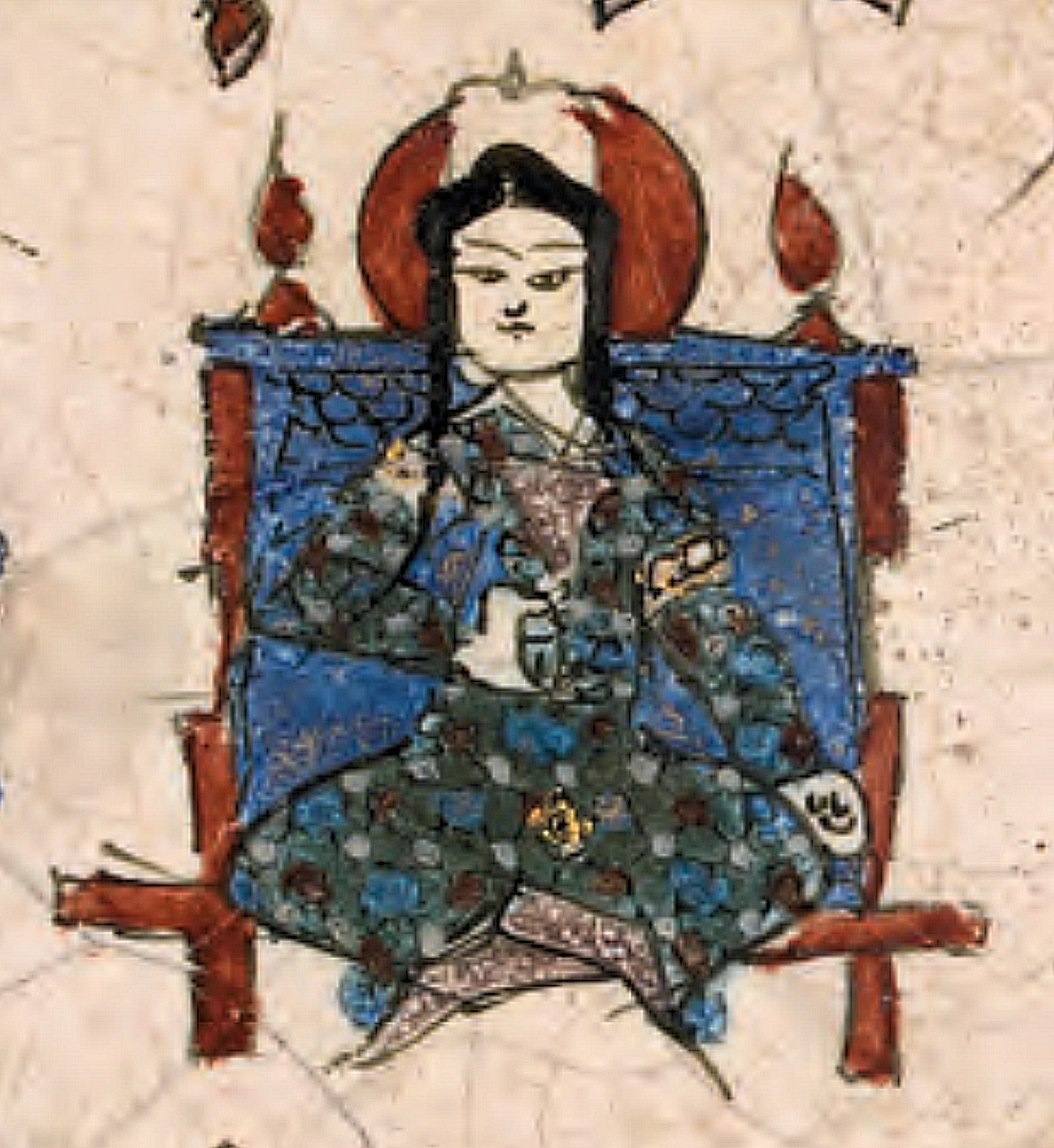
Enthroned person wearing a Qaba dress with tiraz armbands, Kashan, late 12th-early 13th century CE.

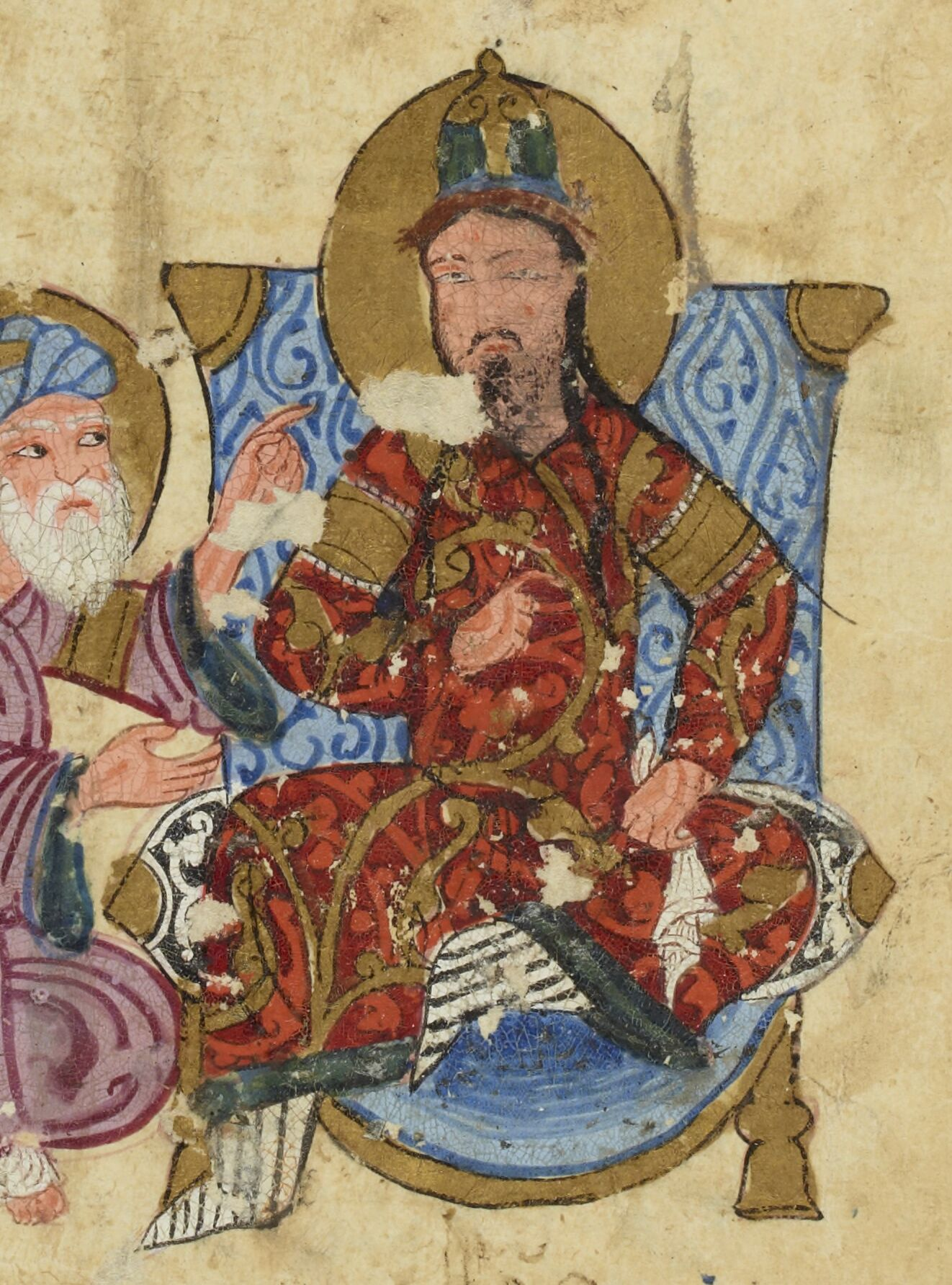
The Governor of Merv, wearing the Qaba al-turkiyya and the sharbūsh hat, in Maqamat al-Hariri (1200-1210).

A qaba (Persian: قبا, romanized: qabā, from Middle Persian kabāh) is a long coat with sleeves and buttons, similar to a cassock, open at the front.

The Mughal emperors wore ankle-length garments. The outfits during the reign of Babur and Humayun are more or less the same, i.e. qaba, jama, pirahan, jilucha, jiba and kasaba. Unlike the jama, which was a four-pointed long-coat the Qaba and takauchia were of a broad girth at the bottom. There are mentions of the qaba in the Baburnama. At present, qaba is one of the essential parts of the dress of the clerics or mosque leaders. It was worn in Egypt, Turkey, the Levant, and Persia, among other places.

When Henry II, Count of Champagne, king of Jerusalem, tried to build a friendly relationship with Saladin, he requested the gift of a qabā and a sharbūsh', which he wore in Acre.

In Arab contexts, two main variations were noted; the Turkish style (al-aqbiya al-turkiyya), and the Tatar (or Mongolian) style (al-aqbiya al-tatariyya or qabā' tatarī). The latter fastened on the wearer's right side, and was preferred by Mamluk amirs in its day over the former style, which was favored by the Seljuks and Ayyubids. Also notable is a variation, typically with a v shaped neck, that closed center front. The garment typically had awaist seamm and some depictions indicate a gathered skirt. It was fastened with buttons or strings tied in bows, and most commonly worn with a belt over top.

== See also ==
- Ammama
- Chiltah
- Terlig
- Jama

== Gallery ==
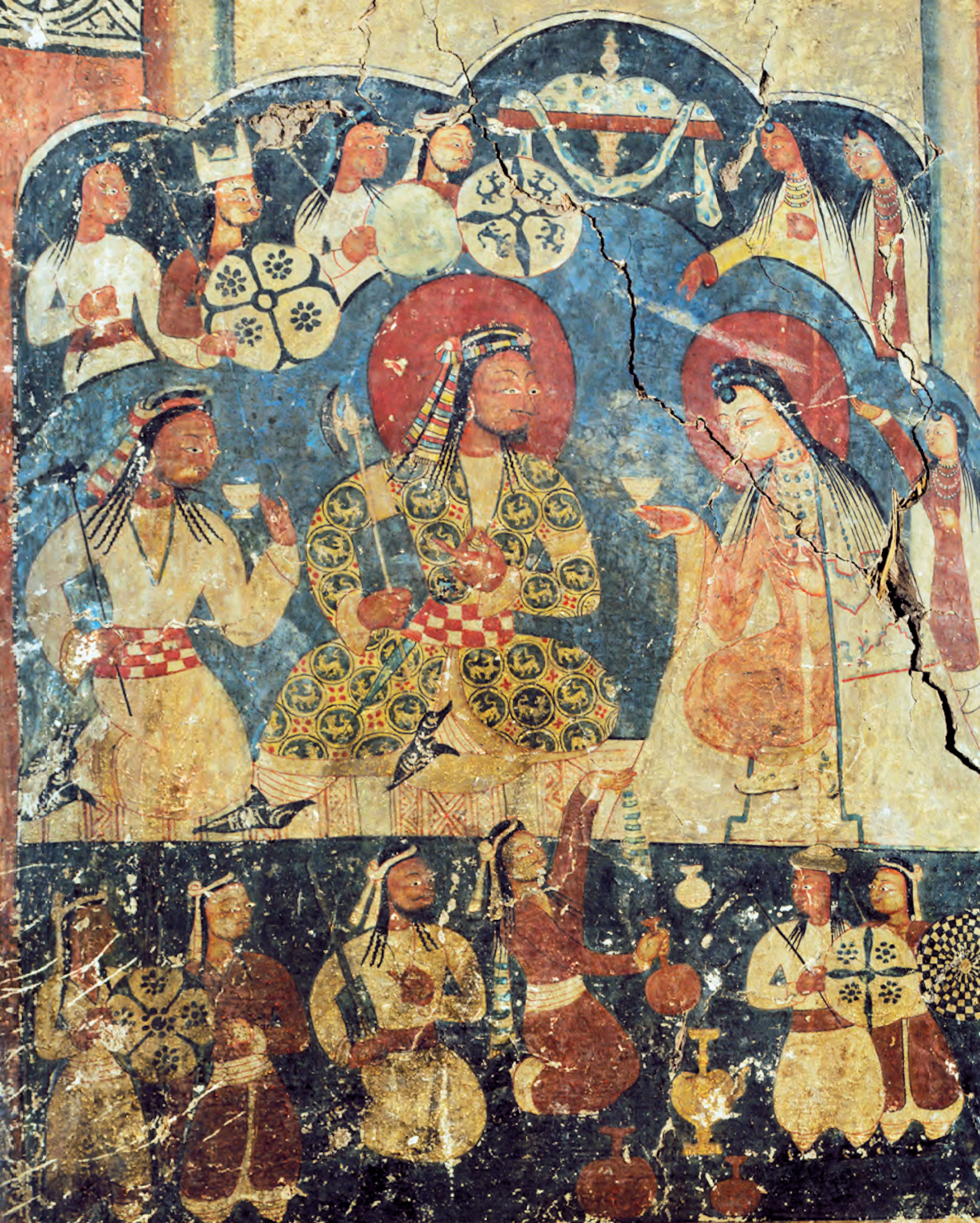
Royal drinking scene in the Dukhang at Alchi Monastery, circa 1200 CE. The king wears a decorated Qabā'.

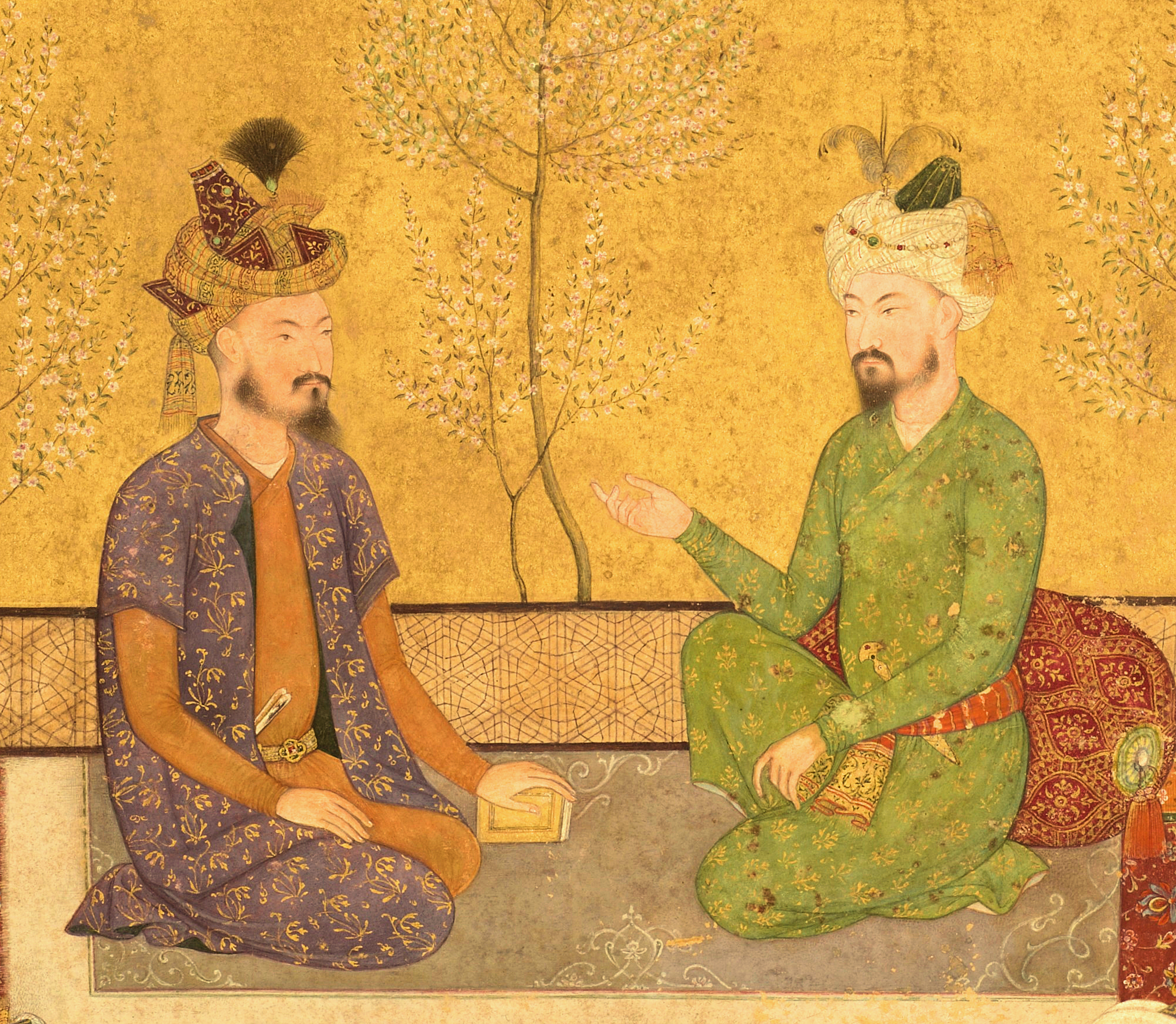
Babur and his heir Humayun

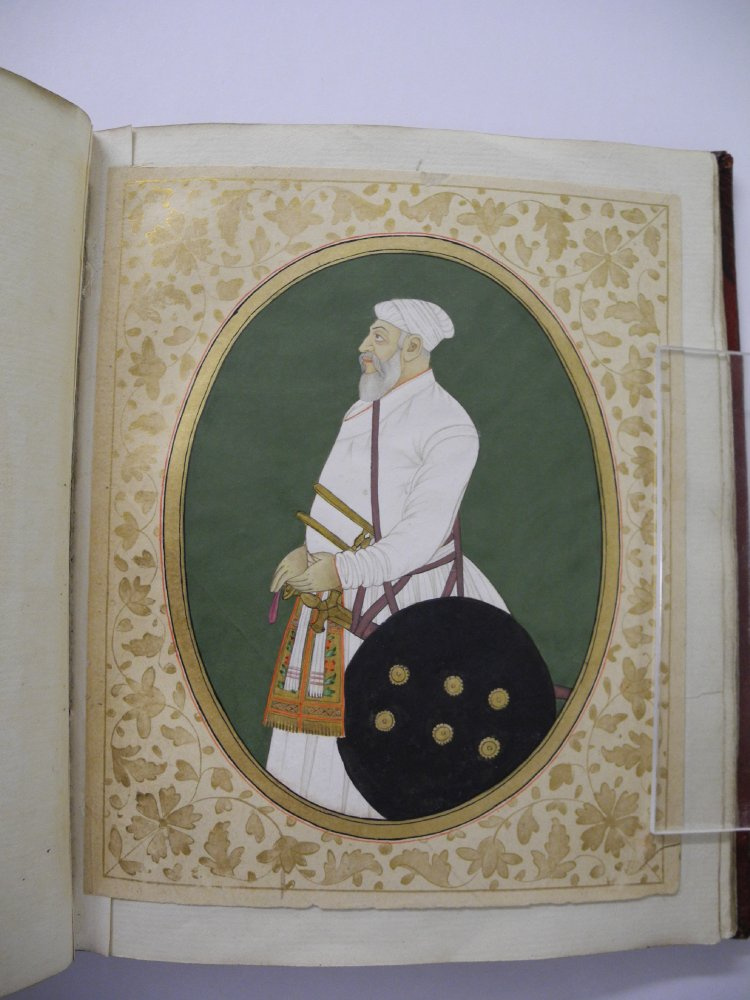
Late 17th century portrait of Fírúz Jang Khán, ruler of Bijapur

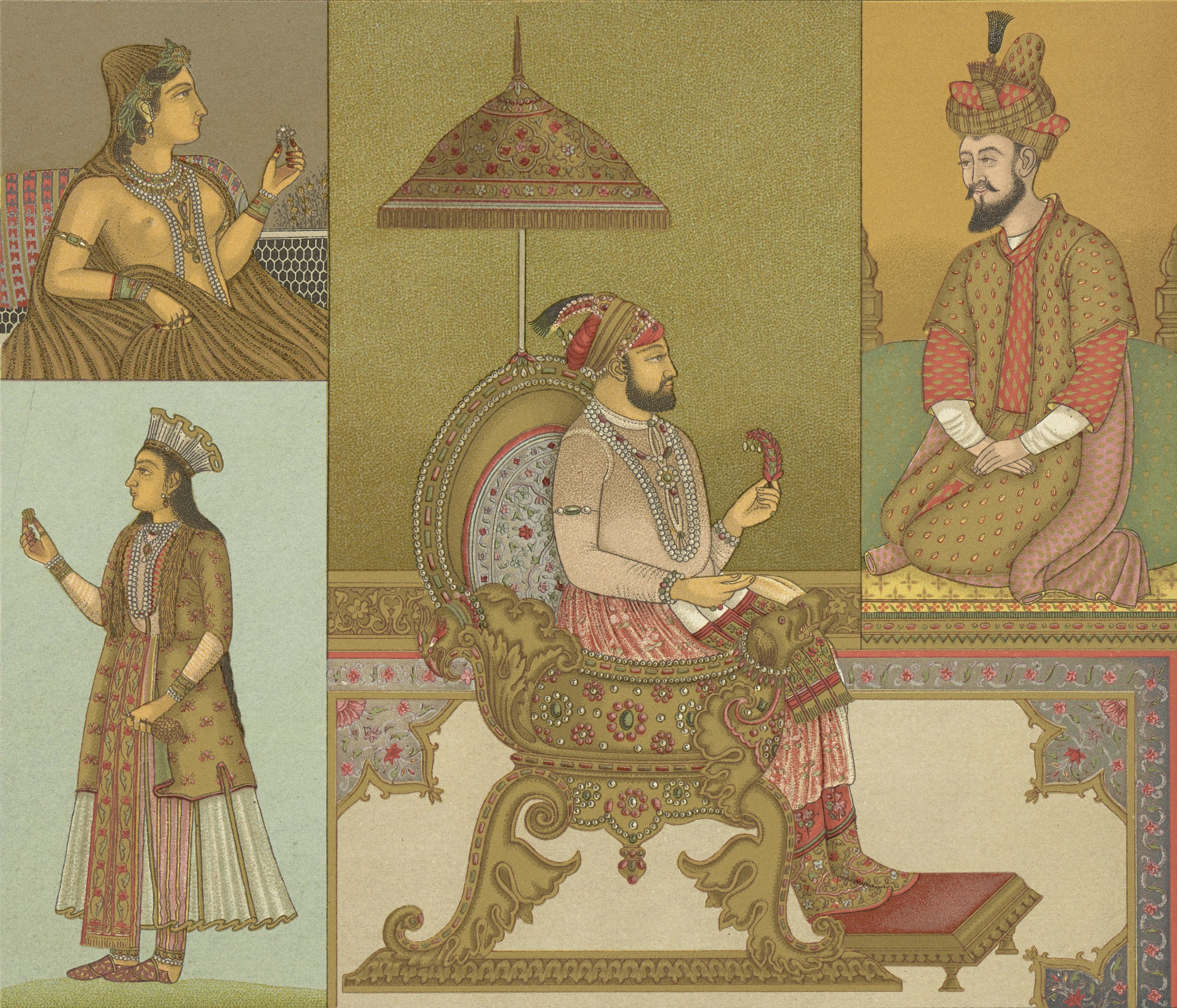
Late 19th century "Costume of India - Moguls" picture depicting Mogul woman (upper left), Mogul Emperor Farrukhsiyar (center) died 1719, and Emperor Humayun (upper right), died in 1556

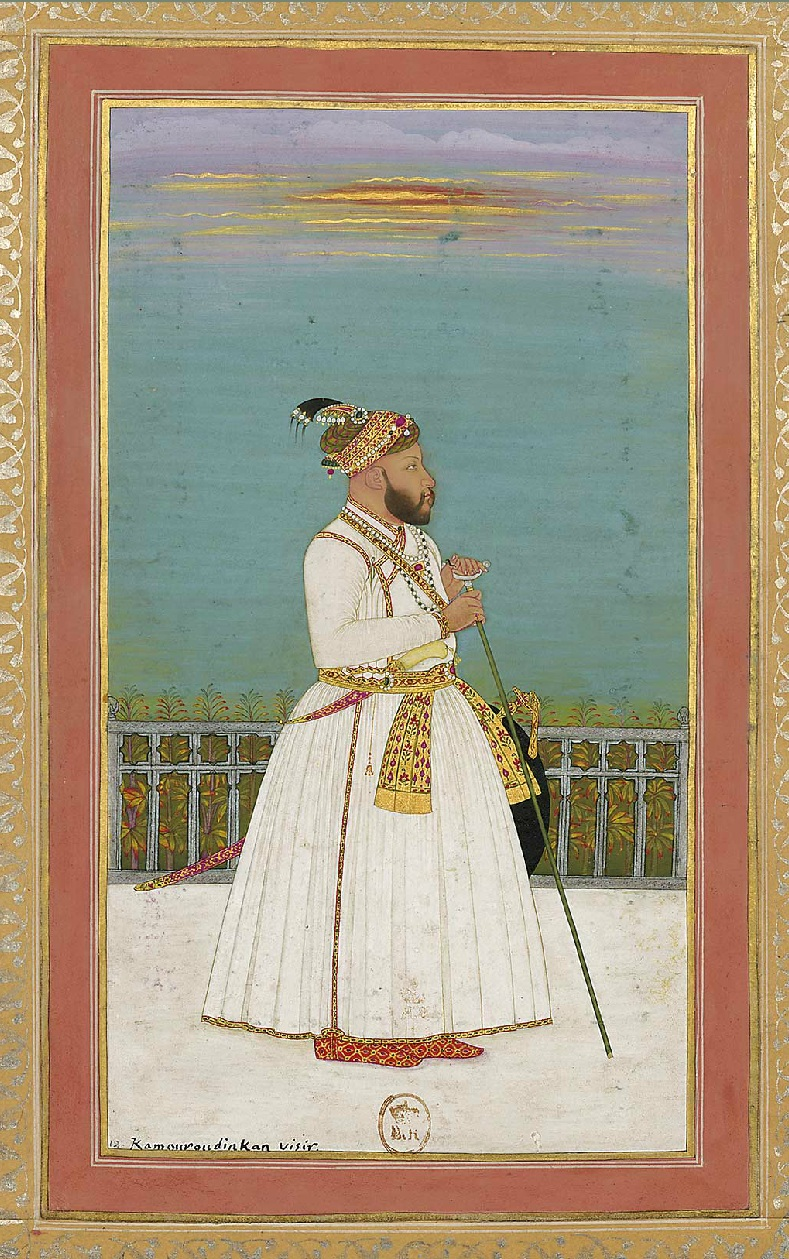
Vizier Qamar ud-Din circa 1735

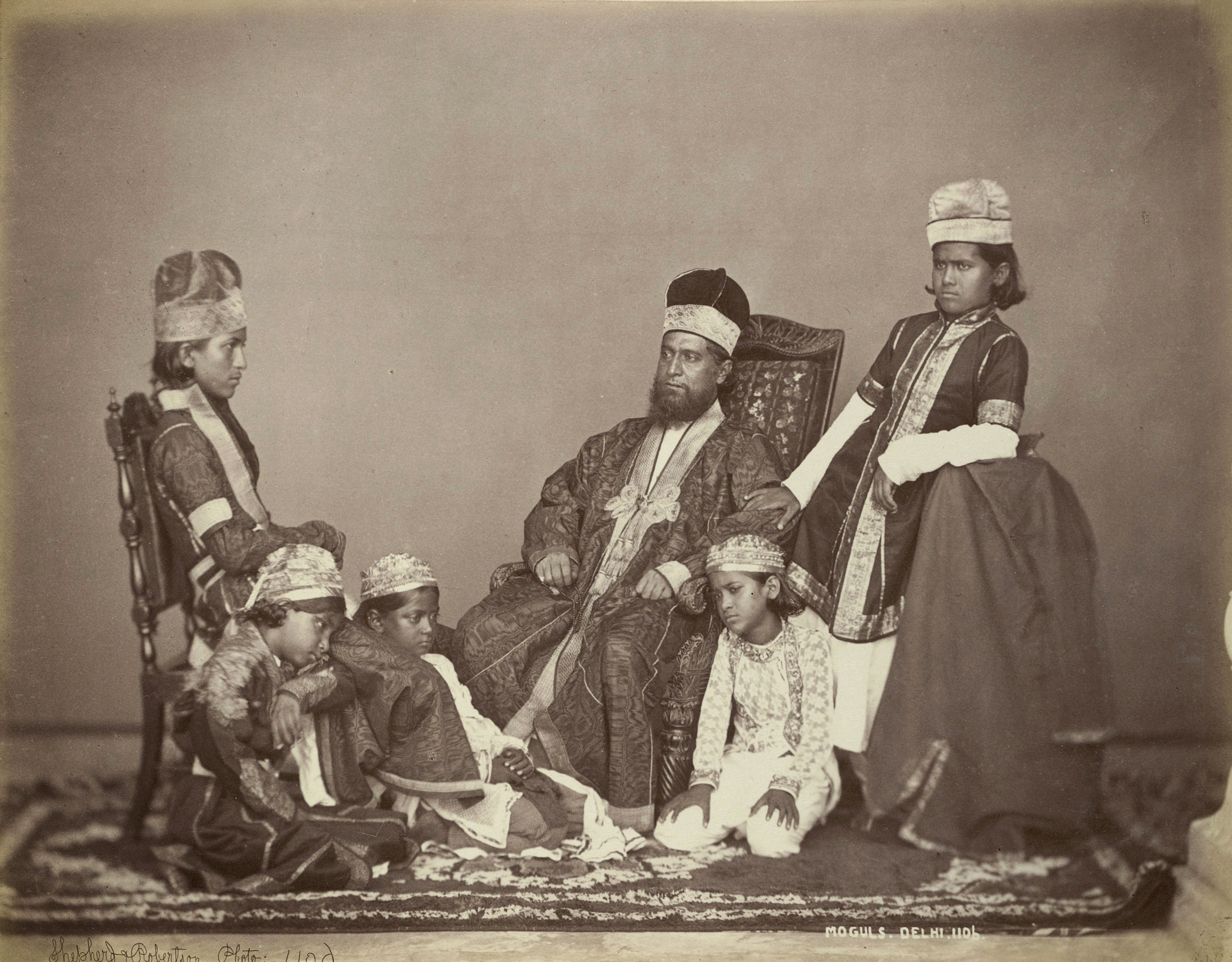
Portrait of "Mogul" father with his children in Delhi (Shepherd & Robertson) circa 1863

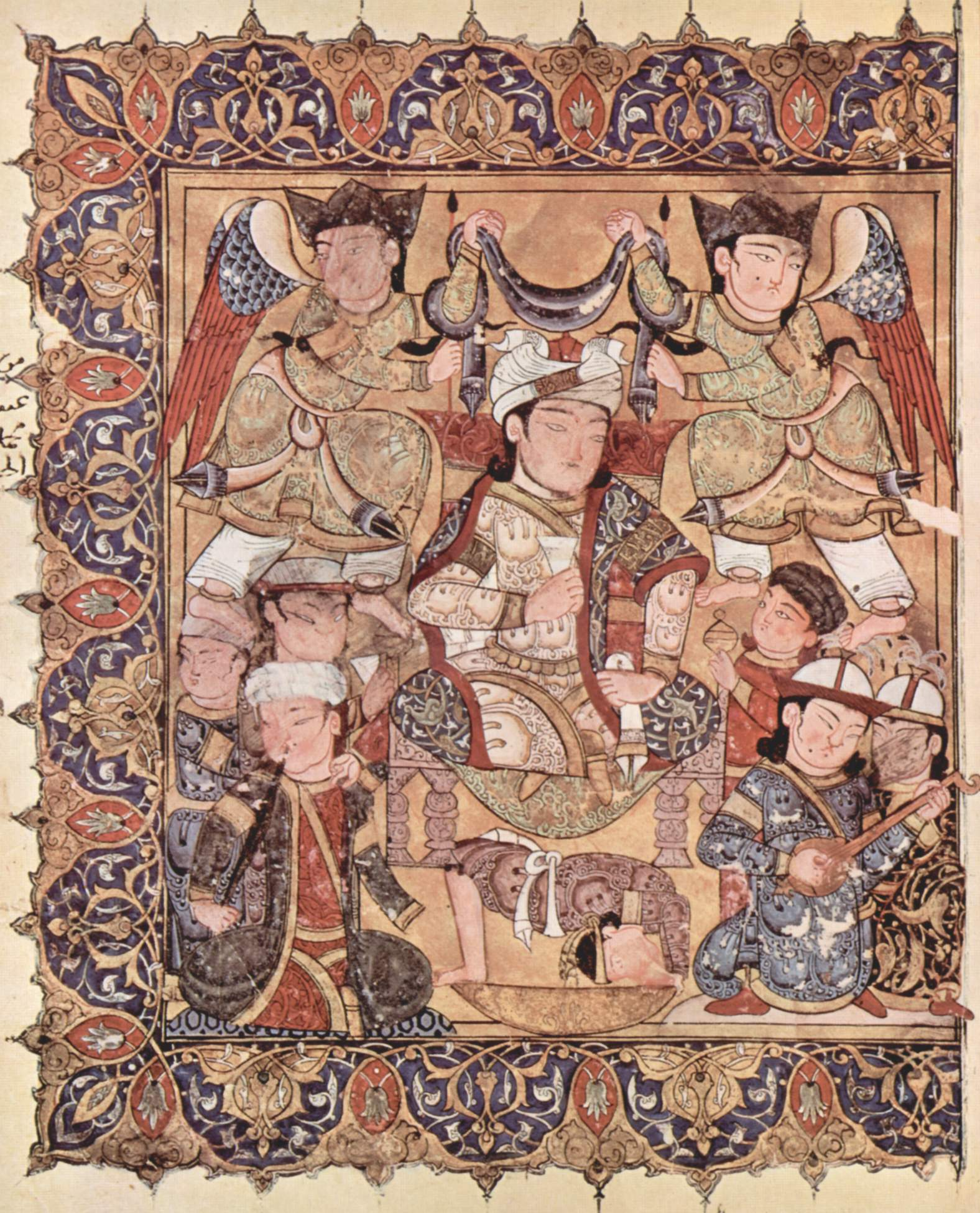
Maqamat of Al-Hariri.

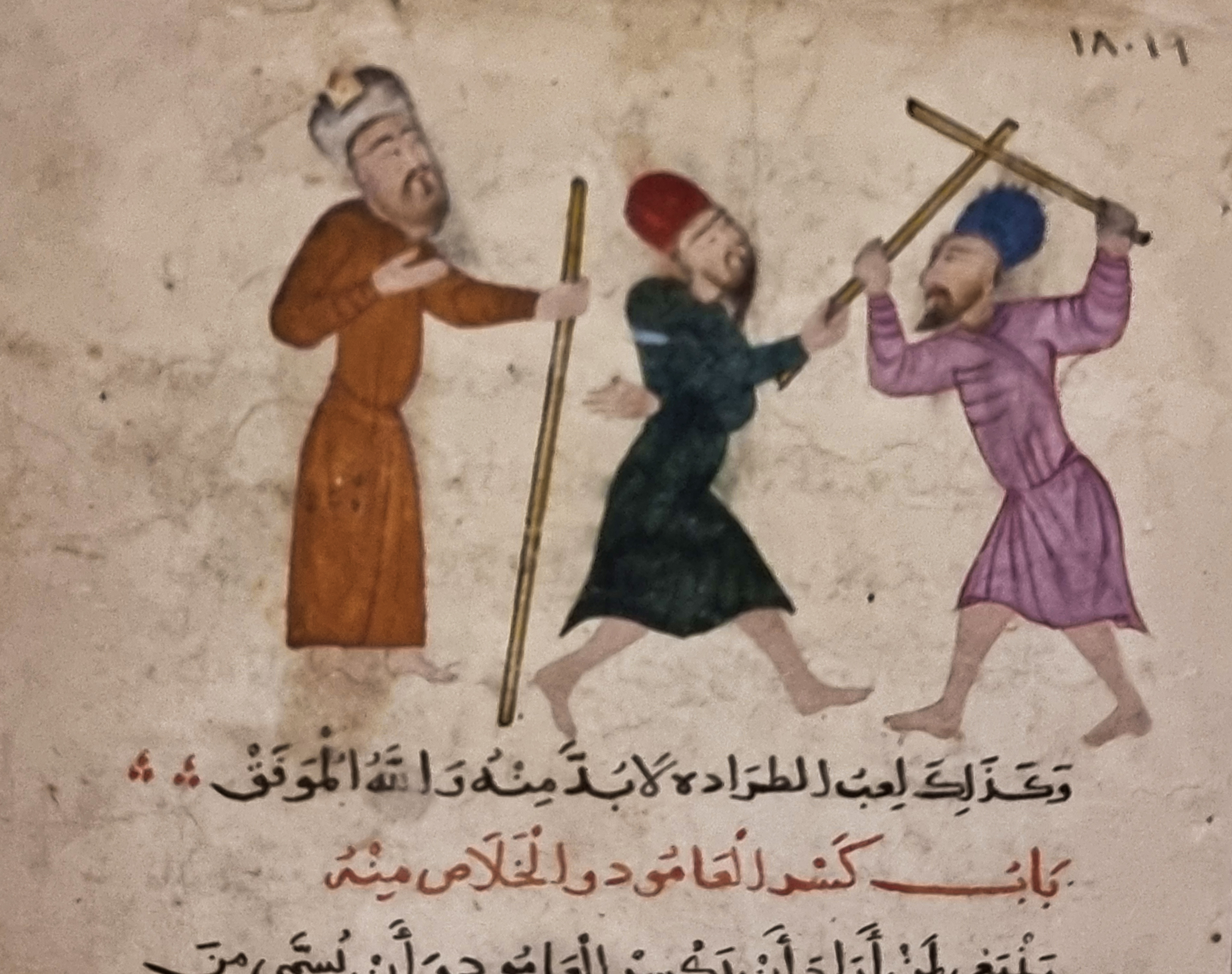
Page from the manuscript of Nihayat al-Sawl; Egypt, Mamluk era, 15th cent.; Museum of Islamic Art, Cairo.

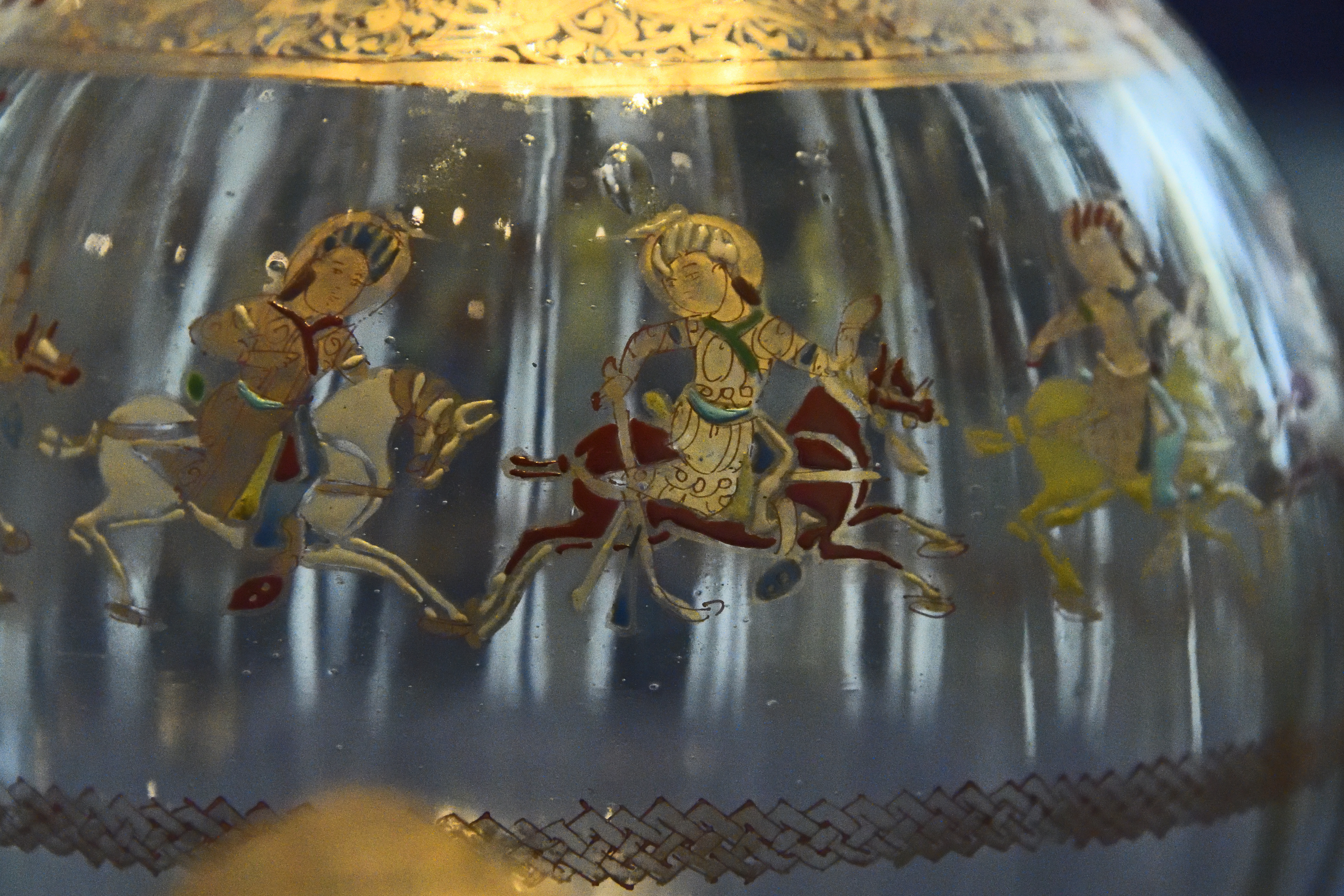
Polo players painted onto glass with enamel and gold paint Egypt or Syria about 1300.

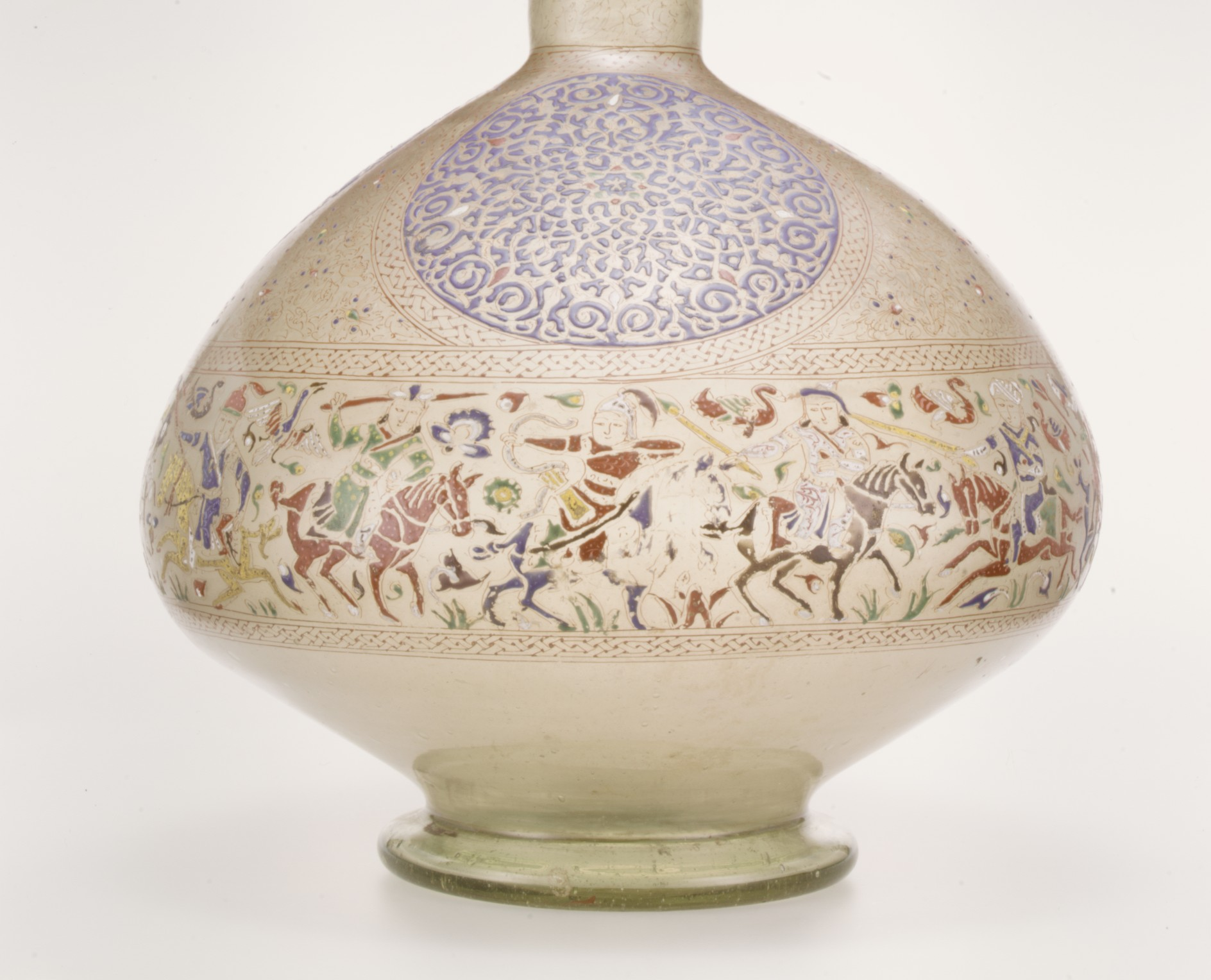
Enameled and Gilded Bottle.

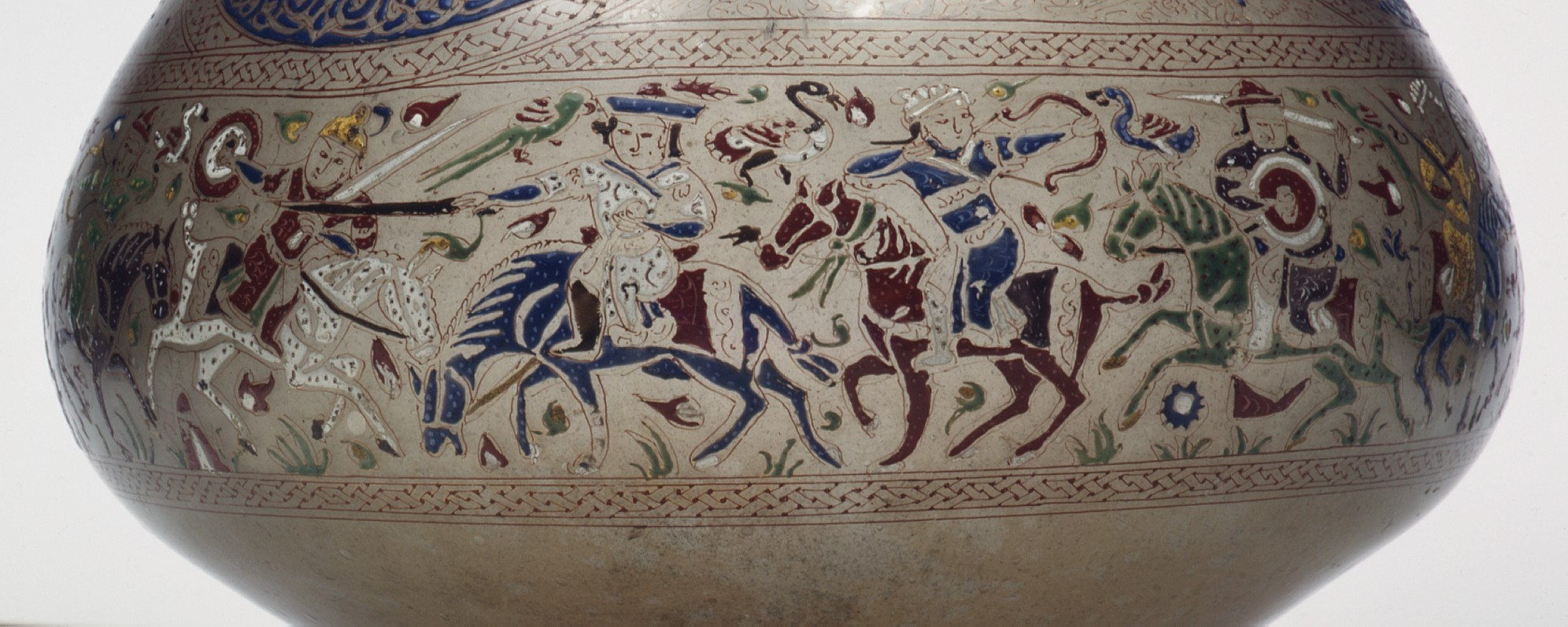
Enameled and Gilded Bottle.
