= Isabella of Ibelin, Queen of Cyprus and Jerusalem =

Isabella of Ibelin

Queen consort of Cyprus
- Tenure: 5 December 1267 – 24 March 1284

Queen consort of Jerusalem
- Tenure: 24 September 1269 – 24 March 1284
- Born: 1241
- Died: 1324 (aged 82–83)
- Spouse: Hugh III of Cyprus
- Issue more...: John I of Cyprus; Henry II of Cyprus; Amalric, Lord of Tyre; Maria; Margaret
- House: House of Ibelin
- Father: Guy of Ibelin

Isabella of Ibelin (1241–1324) was queen of Cyprus and Jerusalem by marriage to Hugh III of Cyprus.

Isabella was the daughter of Guy of Ibelin, marshal and constable of the Kingdom of Cyprus. She married Hugh of Antioch, who succeeded his childless cousin Hugh II as king of Cyprus in 1267 thanks to her family's connections. In 1268, her husband became king of Jerusalem too. He died in 1284 and the crowns passed to their sons, first John I and shortly after to Henry II.

When her son Amalric seized power in 1306, Queen Isabella and her brother Philip unsuccessfully supported her older son King Henry. Amalric was murdered on 5 June 1310, and another son, Aimery, was proclaimed governor in his stead. But by 11 June, supporters of the imprisoned king contacted their mother, Queen Isabella, papal representatives, and Aimery's party. Aimery was outnumbered and agreed with his supporters to restore Henry in return for Isabella's promise to persuade Henry to pardon them and to ratify legal transactions they made. Envoys reported to King James II of Aragon, husband of Isabella's daughter Maria, that Isabella and Philip dominated Henry's court in the rest of his reign.

== Issue ==
Isabella and Hugh III had the following children:

- John I (c. 1268 – 20 May 1285), who succeeded him as king of Jerusalem and Cyprus
- Bohemond (c. 1268 – Tyre, 3 November 1281, buried at the Franciscan Church of Nicosia)
- Henry II (June 1270 – 31 August 1324), who succeeded John as king of Jerusalem and Cyprus
- Amalric (c. 1272 – 5 June 1310), constable of Jerusalem, who displaced Henry and became regent of Cyprus
- Marie (1273 – April 1319 at Tortosa and buried at Barcelona), who married King James II of Aragon
- Aimery (1275 – 1316), succeeded Guy as constable of Cyprus in 1303, briefly succeeded Amalric as regent and governor of Cyprus on 6 June 1310
- Guy (c. 1275/1280 – 1303, probably buried at Nicosia), constable of Cyprus c. 1291, married on 7 December 1291 Eschiva of Ibelin, Lady of Beirut (1253–1312)
- Margaret (c. 1276 – in Armenia, 1296), who married King Thoros III of Armenia
- Alice (1277–1280 – after March 1324), who married 1292–1295 or c. 1292/1294 Balian of Ibelin (died 1315/1316 in Kerynia, soon before 19 April 1316), titular Prince of Galilee and Bethlehem
- Helvis (died after March 1324)
- Isabella (c. 1280 – 1319), who married firstly in 1285/1290 Constantine of Neghir, lord of Partzerpert (died 1308), and secondly c. 1310 King Oshin of Armenia, who divorced her before or in 1316

Isabella of Ibelin, Queen of Cyprus and Jerusalem House of Ibelin Born: 1241 Died: 1324
Royal titles
Preceded by Isabella of Ibelin	Queen consort of Cyprus; 1267–1284	Vacant Title next held by Constance of Sicily
