= King Henry of Cyprus =

King Henry of Cyprus may refer to:

- Henry I of Cyprus (1218–1253), Henry le Gros
- Henry II of Jerusalem (1285–1306, and 1310–1324), who was also Henry II of Cyprus
