= Guy of Ibelin, Constable of Cyprus =

13th-century crusader nobleman

Guy

Constable of Cyprus
- Born: 1215/1218
- Died: after May 1255
- Noble family: House of Ibelin
- Spouse: Phillipa Berlais
- Issue: Baldwin; Balian; Philip; Isabella
- Father: John of Ibelin, the Old Lord of Beirut
- Mother: Melisende of Arsuf

Guy of Ibelin (French: Guy d'Ibelin; 1215/1218 – after May 1255) was marshal and constable of the Kingdom of Cyprus. He was the fifth son of John of Ibelin, the Old Lord of Beirut, and Melisende of Arsuf. He had close relations with the king of Cyprus, Henry I, acting as witness for two royal decrees; he was probably one of the King's executors named in a papal bull of Pope Alexander IV. With his brother Baldwin of Ibelin, he led the Cypriot crusaders in the siege of Damietta in 1248.

According to the medieval chronicler John of Joinville, he was one of the most accomplished knights of his generation and a benevolent ruler on Cyprus. Joinville recounts an episode when he, Guy and Baldwin had been taken prisoner by Saracen rebels:

I asked the lord Baldwin of Ibelin, who knew the saracen tongue well, what the men were saying. He answered that they were talking about cutting off our heads. Many men then made confession to a brother of the Holy Trinity, named John, belonging to the retinue of count William of Flanders. I could not think of a single sin. At the same time I was thinking that the more I defended myself the worse it would be. Then I crossed myself and knelt at the foot of a Saracen, who had a Danish axe in his hand, saying, "Thus was St Agnes killed." Guy of Ibelin, constable of Cypress, knelt beside me and made his confession to me. I answered him: "I grant you absolution by the power God has given me." But when I got up, I could not remember what he had said or told me.

Guy married Phillipa Berlais, daughter of Aimery Berlais. Their children were:

- Baldwin, bailli of the Kingdom of Jerusalem, then constable of the Kingdom of Cyprus
- John, assassinated in 1277
- Aimery
- Balian (1240–1302), seneschal of Cyprus, 1286–1302
- Philip (1253–1318), seneschal of Cyprus, 1302–1318
- Isabella (1241 † 1324), wife of King Hugh III of Cyprus
- Alice, married Odo of Dampierre
- Eschiva, a nun
- Melisende
- Marie

== Sources ==
- Runciman, Steven (1999). A History of the Crusades. Vol. III: The Kingdom of Acre and the Later Crusades. Cambridge University Press.
