= Chiltah =

Outer garment from the Mughal period

Chiltah was a Mughal-period outer garment. It resembled a quilted coat. Chiltah was a royal garment. Jahangir, the fourth Mughal Emperor, wore a nadiri garment with a chiltah.

== Etymology ==
Chiltah is a corrupted word of ''Chihalta'', a multilayer coat worn by soldiers.

== See also ==
- Qaba
