= Guy of Ibelin, seneschal of Cyprus =

Guy
- burgher of Venice
- Coat-of-arms of Ibelin.

Seneschal of Cyprus
- Reign: 1318 – after 1334?
- Predecessor: Philip, seneschal of Cyprus
- Successor: James of Lusignan
- Born: bef. 1306 / bef. 1307
- Died: aft. 14 April 1350 / 1350/1360
- Noble family: House of Ibelin
- Spouse: Margaret of Ibelin
- Issue: John; Alice of Ibelin; Margaret
- Father: Philip, seneschal of Cyprus
- Mother: Maria Embriaco of Giblet

Guy of Ibelin (French: Guy d'Ibelin) (before 1306 or before 1307 – after 14 April 1350 or 1350/1360) was seneschal of Cyprus from 1318 and a burgher of Venice from 30 December 1334. He was the son of Philip of Ibelin (1253–1318), the previous seneschal of Cyprus and Jerusalem by his second wife Maria Embriaco of Giblet (d. 1331). He was evidently held in high regard by King Hugh IV of Cyprus, since he is named in a royal decree from 1329 as a "magnificus vir" , in charge of four newly created priesthoods in the cathedral of Nicosia.

He married Margaret of Ibelin (1307–?) on 13 November 1319 with papal dispensation. She was a sister of Alice of Ibelin and a daughter of Guy of Ibelin and Isabella of Ibelin. They had three children:

- John (name uncertain) of Ibelin (d. after 1367), seneschal of Cyprus in 1363 after his father's death
- Alice of Ibelin (d. after 1374), married John of Lusignan (1329/1330 – 1375), titular Prince of Antioch and Regent of Cyprus
- Margaret of Ibelin (1325–1330 – ?)

== See also ==
- Officers of the Kingdom of Cyprus
