= Hugh of Lusignan (claimant) =

Hugh of Lusignan (French: Hugh de Lusignan) (1335–1385) was titular Prince of Galilee and a claimant to the Kingdom of Cyprus. He was the son of Guy of Lusignan and grandson of King Hugh IV of Cyprus.

== Early life ==
Hugh was the son of Guy of Lusignan, heir to the throne of Cyprus and Prince of Galilee, and Marie of Bourbon, daughter of Louis I, Duke of Bourbon. He was therefore, second in the line of succession of Cyprus until the death of his father in 1343.

From then on, his position as heir and that of his mother because precarious at the court of Cyprus due to her rivalry with her father-in-law, King Hugh IV of Cyprus.

Marie wanted to return to the West with her son, however, the King refused.

With pressure of Pope Clement VI, she convinced the King to let them leave Cyprus in the spring of 1347 whilst Hugh was twelve years old.

Hugh remained however, the formally designed heir of his grandfather.

== Youth (1347–1362) ==
Hugh accompanied his mother to Naples, where she married Robert of Taranto, the Latin Emperor. They then went to the papal court of Avignon, and then to France.

Hugh returned to settle in Naples in 1352 with his step-father who had recently been released from a Hungarian prison.

In Cyprus, the elderly King Hugh IV finally settled the matter of his succession. In November 1358, during his lifetime, he had his second son Peter, (then Count of Tripoli) crowned as king in Nicosia by the Bishop of Limassol as Peter I. Hugh was thus disinherited by this action.

When Hugh IV died in October 1359, Hugh brought the matter of his claim before Pope Innocent VI, notably with the support of the Dauphin Charles, then regent of the Kingdom of France (and husband of Joanna of Bourbon his first cousin). The Pope received him favorably and sent ambassadors to Cyprus to explain the situation.

In 1360, a first embassy, led by the Marshal of Cyprus failed to find a compromise with the pretender. The Pope then summoned Peter I to his court to settle the dispute with his nephew in person.

During this period, Hugh of Lusignan served the papacy in Italian affairs and became a Senator of Rome in 1361. In 1363, he married Joan of Durazzo, a wealthy Neapolitan heiress.

At the end of 1362, King Peter responded to the Pope's summons and met his nephew in Avignon. A compromise was reached, in exchange for Hugh's renunciation of his claim and his homage, Hugh obtained an annual pension of 50,000 Bezants and the lordship of Lefkara, making him the wealthiest lord of Cyprus.

== Prince of the East and West (1362–1385) ==
In 1365, Hugh participated in Peter I's Alexandrian Crusade during which he distinguished himself. In October he witnessed the capture of Alexandria by the royal armies. It was on this occasion that the King granted him the title of Prince of Galilee, which had formally been held in his paternal grandmother's family. He later married Mary of Morphou, daughter of the Count of Edessa in that year.

Around this time, Hugh took part in the conflict for the Principality of Achaea, which he claimed for his mother against Philip II of Taranto after the death of his step-father in 1364. In 1370, the conflict was resolved by a treaty in which Marie and Hugh ceded their rights to Philip for 6,000 Bezants.

He died on Cyprus in 1385, and was buried in the Church of Saint Dominic in Nicosia. He had no children with his wives.
