= Monarch of Jerusalem =

Crusader state ruler (1099–1291)

- Royal coat of arms (1280s)

Details
- First monarch: Godfrey of Bouillon
- Last monarch: Henry II
- Formed: 1099; 927 years ago
- Abolished: 1291; 735 years ago
- Residence: David's Tower
- Pretender: Claimants

The monarch of Jerusalem was the supreme ruler of the Kingdom of Jerusalem, a Crusader state founded in Jerusalem by the Latin Catholic leaders of the First Crusade, when the city was conquered in 1099. Most of them were men, but there were also five queens regnant of Jerusalem, either reigning alone suo jure ("in her own right"), or as co-rulers of husbands who reigned as kings of Jerusalem jure uxoris ("by right of his wife").

Godfrey of Bouillon, the first ruler of the Kingdom of Jerusalem, refused the title of king choosing instead the title Advocatus Sancti Sepulchri, that is Advocate or Defender of the Church of the Holy Sepulchre. In 1100 Baldwin I, Godfrey's successor, was the first ruler crowned as king. The crusaders in Jerusalem were conquered in 1187, but their Kingdom of Jerusalem survived, moving the capital to Acre in 1191. Crusaders re-captured the city of Jerusalem in the Sixth Crusade, during 1229–1239 and 1241–1244.

The Kingdom of Jerusalem was finally dissolved with the fall of Acre and the end of the Crusades in the Holy Land in 1291.

Even after the Crusader States ceased to exist, the title of "Monarch of Jerusalem" was claimed by a number of European noble houses descended from the kings of Cyprus or the kings of Naples, and is claimed by the current king of Spain.

== Monarchs of Jerusalem (1099–1291) ==
The Kingdom of Jerusalem had its origins in the First Crusade, when proposals to govern the city as an ecclesiastical state were rejected. In 1099 Godfrey of Bouillon was elected as the first Latin ruler of Jerusalem and was inaugurated in the Church of the Nativity in Bethlehem. He took the title of prince and Advocatus Sancti Sepulchri, meaning Advocate of the Church of the Holy Sepulchre. This was probably in response to the opinion that only Christ could wear a crown in Jerusalem. Advocatus was a title with which Godfrey was already familiar as the term was much used in the lands where the Crusaders originated; it referred to a layman who protected and administered Church estates. The following year, Godfrey died. His brother Baldwin I was the first to use the title of king and the first to be crowned king in the Church of the Holy Sepulchre in Jerusalem itself.

The kingship of Jerusalem was partially elective and partially hereditary. During the height of the kingdom in the mid-12th century there was a royal family and a relatively clear line of succession. Nevertheless, the king was elected, or at least recognized, by the Haute Cour. Here the king was considered a primus inter pares (first among equals), and in his absence his duties were performed by his seneschal.

The purpose-built royal palace used from the 1160s onwards was located south of Jerusalem's citadel. The Kingdom of Jerusalem introduced French feudal structures to the Levant. The king personally held several fiefs incorporated into the royal domain, that varied from king to king. He was also responsible for leading the kingdom into battle, although this duty could be passed to a constable.

While several contemporary European states were moving towards centralized monarchies, the king of Jerusalem was continually losing power to the strongest of his barons. This was partially due to the young age of many of the kings, and the frequency of regents from the ranks of the nobles.

After the fall of Jerusalem in 1187, the capital of the kingdom was moved to Acre, where it remained until 1291, although coronations took place in Tyre.

In this period the kingship was often simply a nominal position, held by a European ruler who never actually lived in Acre. When young Conrad III was king and living in Southern Germany, his father's second cousin, Hugh of Brienne, claimed the regency of the Kingdom of Jerusalem and, indirectly, his place in the succession. The claim was made in 1264 as senior descendant and rightful heir of Alice of Champagne, second daughter of Queen Isabella I, Hugh being the son of their eldest daughter. But was passed over by the Haute Cour in favour of his cousin, Hugh of Antioch, the future Hugh III of Cyprus and Hugh I of Jerusalem.

After Conrad III's execution by Charles I of Sicily in 1268, the kingship was held by the Lusignan family, who were simultaneously kings of Cyprus. However, Charles I of Sicily purchased the rights of one of the heirs of the kingdom in 1277.

In that year, he sent Roger of Sanseverino to the East as his bailiff. Roger captured Acre and obtained a forced homage from the barons. Roger was recalled in 1282 due to the Sicilian Vespers and left Odo Poilechien in his place to rule. His resources and authority was minimal, and he was ejected by Henry II of Cyprus when he arrived from Cyprus for his coronation as King of Jerusalem.

Acre was captured by the Mamluks in 1291, eliminating the crusader presence on the mainland.

=== House of Boulogne (1099–1118) ===
Monarch	Image	Birth	Marriages	Death
Godfrey; 1099–1100		c. 1060; Flanders son of Eustace II, Count of Boulogne and Ida of Lorraine	never married	18 July 1100; Jerusalem aged about 40
Baldwin I 1100–1118		c. 1060s Lorraine, France son of Eustace II, Count of Boulogne and Ida of Lorraine	Godehilde of Tosny no children Arda of Armenia; 1097 no children Adelaide del Vasto; 1112 no children	2 April 1118; Arish, Egypt aged about 60

=== House of Rethel (1118–1152) ===
Monarch	Image	Birth	Marriages	Death
Baldwin II; 1118–1131		1075; France son of Hugh I, Count of Rethel and Melisende of Montlhéry	Morphia of Melitene; 1101 four daughters	21 August 1131; Jerusalem
Melisende; 1131–1152 with Fulk until 1143 with Baldwin III from 1143		1105; Jerusalem daughter of King Baldwin II and Morphia of Melitene	Fulk V, Count of Anjou; 2 June 1129; 2 sons	11 September 1161; Jerusalem aged 56

=== House of Anjou (1152–1205) ===
In 1127 Fulk V, Count of Anjou, received an embassy from King Baldwin II of Jerusalem. Baldwin II had no male heirs but had already designated his daughter Melisende to succeed him. Baldwin II wanted to safeguard his daughter's inheritance by marrying her to a powerful lord. Fulk was a wealthy crusader and experienced military commander, and a widower. His experience in the field would prove invaluable in a frontier state always in the grip of war.

However, Fulk held out for better terms than mere consort of the Queen; he wanted to be king alongside Melisende. Baldwin II, reflecting on Fulk's fortune and military exploits, acquiesced. Fulk then resigned his titles to his son Geoffrey and sailed to become King of Jerusalem, where he married Melisende on 2 June 1129. Later Baldwin II bolstered Melisende's position in the kingdom by making her sole guardian of her son by Fulk, Baldwin III, born in 1130.

Fulk and Melisende became joint rulers of Jerusalem in 1131 with Baldwin II's death. From the start Fulk assumed sole control of the government, excluding Melisende altogether. He favored fellow countrymen from Anjou to the native nobility. The other crusader states to the north feared that Fulk would attempt to impose the suzerainty of Jerusalem over them, as Baldwin II had done; but as Fulk was far less powerful than his deceased father-in-law, the northern states rejected his authority.

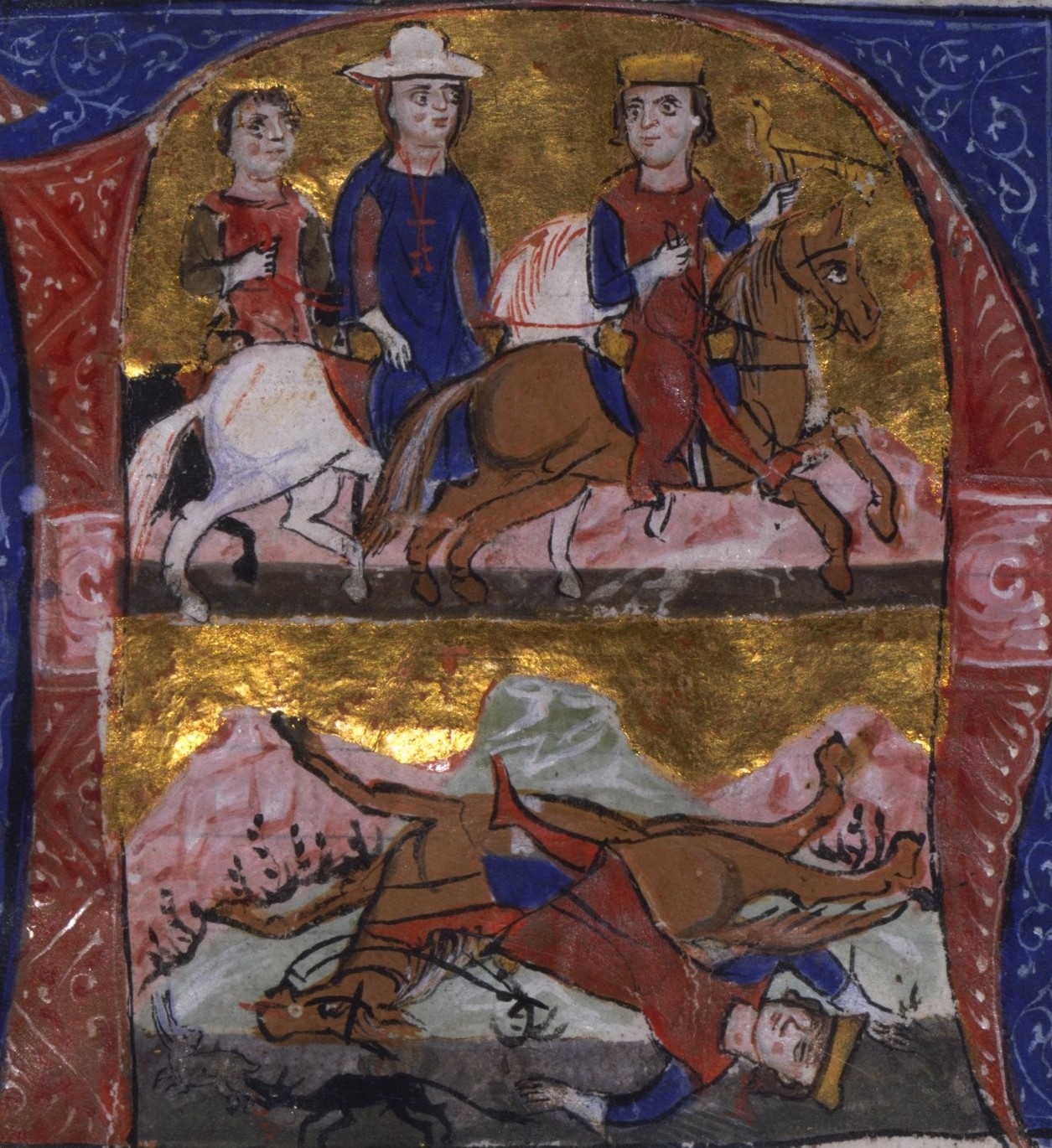
The death of Fulk, as depicted in MS of William of Tyre's Historia and Old French Continuation, painted in Acre, 13C. Bib. Nat. Française.

In Jerusalem as well, Fulk was resented by the second generation of Jerusalem Christians who had grown up there since the First Crusade. These "natives" focused on Melisende's cousin, the popular Hugh II of Jaffa, who was devotedly loyal to the Queen. Fulk saw Hugh as a rival, and in 1134, in order to expose Hugh, accused him of infidelity with Melisende. Hugh rebelled in protest and secured himself to Jaffa, allying himself with the Muslims of Ascalon. He was able to defeat the army set against him by Fulk, but this situation could not hold. The Patriarch interceded in the conflict, perhaps at the behest of Melisende. Fulk agreed to peace and Hugh was exiled from the kingdom for three years, a lenient sentence.

However, an assassination attempt was made against Hugh. Fulk, or his supporters, were commonly believed responsible, though direct proof never surfaced. The scandal was all that was needed for the queen's party to take over the government in what amounted to a palace coup. Author and historian Bernard Hamilton wrote that the Fulk's supporters "went in terror of their lives" in the palace. Contemporary author and historian William of Tyre wrote of Fulk "he never attempted to take the initiative, even in trivial matters, without (Melisende's) consent". The result was that Melisende held direct and unquestioned control over the government from 1136 onwards. Sometime before 1136 Fulk reconciled with his wife, and a second son, Amalric, was born.

In 1143, while the king and queen were on holiday in Acre, Fulk was mortally wounded in a hunting accident. His horse stumbled, fell, and Fulk's skull was crushed by the saddle, "and his brains gushed forth from both ears and nostrils", as William of Tyre describes. He was carried back to Acre, where he lay unconscious for three days before he died. He was buried in the Church of the Holy Sepulchre in Jerusalem. Though their marriage started in conflict, Melisende mourned for him privately as well as publicly. Fulk was survived by his son Geoffrey Plantagenet, Count of Anjou by his first wife, and Baldwin III and Amalric I by Melisende.

Baldwin III ascended the throne with his mother as co-ruler, in 1143. His early reign was laced with squabbles with his mother over the possession of Jerusalem, till 1152, when he took personal hold of the government. He died in 1163, without heirs, and the kingdom passed to his brother, Amalric I, although there was some opposition among the nobility to Amalric's wife Agnes; they were willing to accept the marriage in 1157 when Baldwin III was still capable of siring an heir, but now the Haute Cour refused to endorse Amalric as king unless his marriage to Agnes was annulled. The hostility to Agnes may have been exaggerated by the chronicler William of Tyre, whom she prevented from becoming Latin Patriarch of Jerusalem decades later, as well as from William's continuators like Ernoul, who hints at a slight on her moral character: "car telle n'est que roine doie iestre di si haute cite comme de Jherusalem" ("there should not be such a queen for so holy a city as Jerusalem").

Nevertheless, consanguinity was enough for the opposition. Amalric agreed and ascended the throne without a wife, although Agnes continued to hold the title Countess of Jaffa and Ascalon and received a pension from that fief's income. The church ruled that Agnes's children were legitimate and preserved their place in the order of succession. Through them Agnes would exert much influence in Jerusalem for almost 20 years. Almaric was succeeded by his son by Agnes, Baldwin IV.

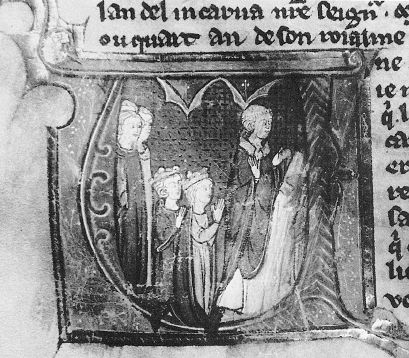
The marriage of Amalric I of Jerusalem and Maria Comnena at Tyre

Almaric's first wife Agnes of Courtenay was now married to Reginald of Sidon; Maria Comnena, the dowager Queen, had married Balian of Ibelin in 1177. His daughter by Agnes, Sibylla, was already of age, the mother of a son, and was clearly in a strong position to succeed her brother, but Maria's daughter Isabella had the support of her stepfather's family, the Ibelins.

In 1179, Baldwin began planning to marry Sibylla to Hugh III of Burgundy, but by spring 1180 this was still unresolved. Raymond III of Tripoli attempted a coup, and began to march on Jerusalem with Bohemund III, to force the king to marry his sister to a local candidate of his own choosing, probably Baldwin of Ibelin, Balian's older brother. To counter this, the king hastily arranged her marriage to Guy of Lusignan, younger brother of Amalric, the constable of the kingdom. A foreign match was essential to bring the possibility of external military aid to the kingdom. With the new French king Philip II a minor, Guy's status as a vassal of the King and Sibylla's first cousin Henry II of England – who owed the Pope a penitential pilgrimage – was useful.

By 1182, Baldwin IV, increasingly incapacitated by his leprosy, named Guy as bailli. Raymond contested this, but when Guy fell out of favour with Baldwin the following year, he was re-appointed bailli and was given possession of Beirut. Baldwin came to an agreement with Raymond and the Haute Cour to make Baldwin of Montferrat, Sibylla's son by her first marriage, his heir, before Sibylla and Guy. The child was crowned co-king as Baldwin V in 1183 in a ceremony presided by Raymond. It was agreed that, should the boy die during his minority, the regency would pass to "the most rightful heirs" until his kinsmen – the Kings of England and France and Frederick I, Holy Roman Emperor – and the Pope were able to adjudicate between the claims of Sibylla and Isabella. These "most rightful heirs" were not named.

Baldwin IV died in spring 1185, and was succeeded by his nephew. Raymond was bailli, but he had passed Baldwin V's personal guardianship to Joscelin III of Edessa, his maternal great-uncle, claiming that he did not wish to attract suspicion if the child, who does not seem to have been robust, were to die. Baldwin V died during the summer of 1186, at Acre. Neither side paid any heed to Baldwin IV's will.

After the funeral, Joscelin had Sibylla named as her brother's successor, although she had to agree to divorce Guy, just as her father had divorced her mother, with the guarantee that she would be allowed to choose a new consort. Once crowned, she immediately crowned Guy. Meanwhile, Raymond had gone to Nablus, home of Balian and Maria, and summoned all those nobles loyal to Princess Isabella and the Ibelins. Raymond wanted instead to have her and her husband Humphrey IV of Toron crowned. However, Humphrey, whose stepfather Raynald of Châtillon was an ally of Guy, deserted him and swore allegiance to Guy and Sibylla.

Monarch	Image	Birth	Marriages	Death	Notes
Fulk; 1131–1143 with Melisende		1089/1092; Angers, France son of Fulk IV, Count of Anjou and Bertrade de Montfort	Ermengarde of Maine; 1109; 4 children Melisende of Jerusalem; 2 June 1129; 2 sons	13 November 1143; Acre, Kingdom of Jerusalem aged about 52	
Baldwin III; 1143–1163 with Melisende until 1152		1130 son of King Fulk and Queen Melisende	Theodora Komnene; 1158 no children	10 February 1163; Beirut, Kingdom of Jerusalem aged 33	Crowned co-king with his mother Melisende on Christmas Day 1143 shortly after the death of his father Fulk. Just 13 years old when he ascended to the throne, he immediately had to deal with the loss of Edessa in 1144 and the Second Crusade through 1149. He engaged his mother in a civil war from 1152 to 1154, with the two eventually reconciling. He was responsible for the military first success after the Second Crusade, the siege of Ascalon of 1153, resulting in the capture of a strategic fortress from the Fatimids. In 1156, Baldwin was forced into a treaty with Nūr-ad-Din, and later entered into an alliance with the Byzantine Empire. Melisende died on 11 September 1161, and Baldwin succumbed two years later on 10 February 1163. Childless, he was succeeded by his brother, Amalric.
Amalric; 1163–1174		1136 son of King Fulk and Queen Melisende	Agnes of Courtenay; 1157; 3 children Maria Komnene; 29 August 1167; 2 children	11 July 1174; Jerusalem aged 38	Crowned as King of Jerusalem on 18 February 1163. He married Agnes of Courtenay and, after an annulment, Maria Komnene. Three of Amalric's children would assume the throne of Jerusalem. He undertook a series of four invasions of Egypt from 1163 to 1169, taking advantage of weaknesses of the Fatimids. The campaign was generally indecisive, but did lay the groundwork for the takeover of Egypt by Saladin in 1171. Amalric died at a young age, on 11 July 1174, and was succeeded by his son Baldwin IV of Jerusalem.
Baldwin IV the Leprous; 1174–1185 with Baldwin V from 1183		1161; Jerusalem son of King Amalric and Agnes of Courtenay	never married	16 March 1185; Jerusalem aged 24	Became king on 5 July 1174 at the age of 13. As a leper he was not expected to live long, and served with a number of regents, and served as co-ruler with his nephew Baldwin V of Jerusalem beginning in 1183. Baldwin IV's rule began simultaneously with the death of Nūr-ad-Din and the rise of Saladin. Notably, Baldwin and Raynald of Châtillon defeated Saladin at the celebrated battle of Montgisard on 25 November 1177, and repelled his attacks at the battle of Belvoir Castle in 1182 and later in the siege of Kerak of 1183. He died on 16 March 1185.
Baldwin V 1183–1186 with Baldwin IV until 1185		1177 son of William of Montferrat and Sibylla of Jerusalem	never married	August 1186; Acre, Kingdom of Jerusalem aged 9	Became sole king upon the death of his uncle in 1185 under the regency of Raymond III of Tripoli. Raymond negotiated a truce with Saladin which went awry when Baldwin V died in the summer of 1186. He was succeeded in the kingdom by his mother Sibylla of Jerusalem—daughter of Amalric—and his stepfather, the French knight Guy of Lusignan.
Sibylla; 1186–1190 with Guy		c. 1157 daughter of King Amalric and Agnes of Courtenay	William of Montferrat, Count of Jaffa and Ascalon; 1176 one son Guy of Lusignan; April 1180; 2 daughters	25 July (probable), 1190; Acre, Kingdom of Jerusalem aged about 30	Crowned as queen and king of Jerusalem in the summer of 1186, shortly after the death of Baldwin V. They immediately had to deal with the threat posed by Saladin, and, in particular the battle of Hattin in 1187. During the battle Guy was captured, and remained in Saladin's custody until 1188. After the fall of Jerusalem, Sibylla fled to Tripoli, later joining Guy in Acre to meet the vanguard of the Third Crusade. She died on 25 July 1190.
Guy of Lusignan; 1186–1190/1192 with Sibylla until 1190		c. 1150 or 1159/1160 son of Hugh VIII of Lusignan and Bourgogne de Rançon	Sibylla of Jerusalem; April 1180; 2 daughters	18 July 1194; Nicosia, Cyprus aged about 45	Crowned as queen and king of Jerusalem in the summer of 1186, shortly after the death of Baldwin V. They immediately had to deal with the threat posed by Saladin, and, in particular the battle of Hattin in 1187. During the battle Guy was captured, and remained in Saladin's custody until 1188. After the fall of Jerusalem, Sibylla fled to Tripoli, later joining Guy in Acre to meet the vanguard of the Third Crusade. She died on 25 July 1190.
Isabella I 1190/1192-1205 with Conrad until 1192 with Henry II 1192–1197 with Amalric II from 1198		1172; Nablus, Kingdom of Jerusalem daughter of King Amalric I and Maria Komnene	Humphrey IV of Toron; November 1183 no children Conrad of Montferrat; 24 November 1190 one daughter Henry II, Count of Champagne; 6 May 1192; 3 daughters Amalric of Lusignan; January 1198; 3 children	5 April 1205; Acre, Kingdom of Jerusalem aged 33	Sister to Sibylla, became heiress to the kingdom upon her death, sometime after 25 July 1190. After much political haranguing, she married Conrad of Montferrat on 24 November 1190, with him become de jure king. In April 1192, Conrad was elected king but on 28 April 1192, he was felled by two Assassins before he could be crowned. His political rival Richard I of England was suspected as having supported the murder, a suspicion that remains unproven.
Conrad I of Montferrat; 1190/1192–1192 with Isabella I		mid-1140s Montferrat, Holy Roman Empire son of William V, Marquess of Montferrat and Judith of Babenberg	unidentified woman before 1179 no children Theodora Angelina; 1186/1187 no children Isabella I of Jerusalem; 24 November 1190 one daughter	28 April 1192 (murdered); Acre, Kingdom of Jerusalem aged mid-40s	Sister to Sibylla, became heiress to the kingdom upon her death, sometime after 25 July 1190. After much political haranguing, she married Conrad of Montferrat on 24 November 1190, with him become de jure king. In April 1192, Conrad was elected king but on 28 April 1192, he was felled by two Assassins before he could be crowned. His political rival Richard I of England was suspected as having supported the murder, a suspicion that remains unproven.
Henry II of Champagne; 1192–1197 with Isabella I		29 July 1166; Champagne son of Henry I, Count of Champagne and Marie of France	Isabella I of Jerusalem; 6 May 1192; 3 daughters	10 September 1197; Acre, Kingdom of Jerusalem aged 31	Became king on 5 May 1192 when he married Isabella. Henry was the nephew of both Richard I of England and Philip II of France, but did not use the royal title. He died in Acre on 10 September 1197 after a fall from his window at the palace in Acre.
Aimery of Lusignan; 1198–1205 with Isabella I		1145 son of Hugh VIII of Lusignan and Bourgogne de Rançon	Éschive d'Ibelin before 29 October 1174; 6 children Isabella I of Jerusalem; January 1198; 3 children	1 April 1205; Acre, Kingdom of Jerusalem aged 60	As Isabella's next husband, they were crowned king and queen of in January 1198. A former commander at the Battle of Hattin of 1187 as well as King of Cyprus since the death of Guy of Lusignan in 1194, his rule was a period of peace and stability in both of his realms. In particular, he signed a truce with al-Adil, now Ayyubid sultan of Egypt in 1198 which secured the Christian possession of the coastline from Acre to Antioch. This truce essentially prevented the remnants of the Fourth Crusade from their mission. He died on 1 April 1205. His son Hugh I of Cyprus succeeded him in Cyprus, while Isabella I continued to rule the Kingdom of Jerusalem. Isabella died four days later on 5 April 1205 and was succeeded by her daughter by Conrad, Maria of Montferrat, who served through 1212, with her husband John of Brienne after 1210.

=== Houses of Aleramici and Brienne (1205–1228) ===
Monarch	Image	Birth	Marriages	Death
Maria; 1205–1212 with John I from 1210		1192 daughter of Conrad of Montferrat and Queen Isabella	John of Brienne; 14 September 1210 one daughter	1212 aged 20
John I 1210–1225 with Maria until 1212 with Isabella II from 1212		c. 1170 son of Erard II of Brienne and Agnes de Montfaucon	Maria of Jerusalem; 14 September 1210 one daughter Stephanie of Armenia one son Berengaria of León; 1224; 4 children	27 March 1237 aged about 67
Isabella II also called Yolande; 1212–1228 with Frederick from 1225		1212 daughter of John of Brienne and Queen Maria	Frederick II, Holy Roman Emperor; 9 November 1225; 2 children	25 April 1228; Andria, Kingdom of Sicily aged 16
Frederick; 1225–43 with Isabella II until 1228 with Conrad II from 1228		1194 son of Henry VI, Holy Roman Emperor and Constance of Sicily	Constance of Aragon; 15 August 1209 one son Isabella II of Jerusalem; 9 November 1225; 2 children Isabella of England; 15 July 1235; 4 children	13 December 1250; Apulia, Kingdom of Sicily aged 55

=== House of Hohenstaufen (1228–1268) ===
Monarch	Image	Birth	Marriages	Death
Conrad II; 1228–1254		25 April 1228; Andria, Kingdom of Sicily son of Frederick II, Holy Roman Emperor and Queen Isabella II	Elisabeth of Bavaria; 1 September 1246 one son	21 May 1254; Lavello, Kingdom of Sicily aged 26
Conrad III; 1254–1268		25 March 1252; Wolfstein Castle, Landshut, Bavaria, Holy Roman Empire son of King Conrad II and Elisabeth of Bavaria	never married	29 October 1268; Castel dell'Ovo, Naples, Kingdom of Sicily aged 16

=== House of Lusignan (1268–1291) ===
Monarch	Image	Birth	Marriages	Death
Hugh; 1268–1284		1235 son of Henry of Antioch and Isabella of Cyprus, a granddaughter of Queen Isabella I	Isabella of Ibelin after 25 January 1255; 11 children	24 March 1284; Nicosia, Cyprus aged 49
John II; 1284–1285		1259/1267 son of King Hugh and Isabella of Ibelin	never married	20 May 1285; Nicosia, Cyprus aged 17 or 26
Henry II; 1285–1324 in title only after 1291		1271 son of King Hugh and Isabella of Ibelin	Constance of Sicily; 16 October 1317 no children	31 August 1324; Strovolos, Cyprus aged 53

=== Regents ===
The frequent absence or minority of monarchs required regents to be appointed many times throughout the Kingdom's existence.

Regent	Regent for	Relation to the monarch	Became regent	Regency ended
Eustace Grenier, Constable of the Kingdom	Baldwin II	–	1123; King held captive by the Ortoqids	1123 death
William I of Bures, Prince of Galilee	Baldwin II	–	1123; King held captive by the Ortoqids	1124 return of the King from captivity
Queen Melisende	Baldwin III	mother	1154 as the King's advisor	1161 death
Raymond III, Count of Tripoli	Baldwin IV	cousin	1174 minority of the King	1176 majority of the King
Guy of Lusignan	Baldwin IV	brother-in-law	1182 appointed by the King in his illness	1184 deposed by the King
Raymond III, Count of Tripoli	Baldwin V	first cousin once removed	1185 minority of the King	1186 death of the King
John of Ibelin, the Old Lord of Beirut	Maria	half-uncle	1205 minority of the Queen	1210 majority of the Queen
King John I	Isabella II	father	1212 minority of the Queen	1225 the Queen's marriage
Frederick II, Holy Roman Emperor	Conrad II	father	1228 minority of the King	1243 majority of the king
Alice of Champagne, Queen of Cyprus	Conrad II	half-aunt	1243 absence of the king	1246 death
Henry I of Cyprus	Conrad II	half-cousin; son of Alice and Hugh I	1246 absence of the King	1253 death
Plaisance of Antioch, dowager Queen of Cyprus	Conrad II	half-cousin-in-law	1253 absence/minority of the King	1261 death
Plaisance of Antioch, dowager Queen of Cyprus	Conrad III	half-cousin-in-law once removed	1253 absence/minority of the King	1261 death
Isabelle de Lusignan	Conrad III	half-cousin once removed; daughter of Alice	1261 minority of the King	1264 death
Hugh of Antioch	Conrad III	half-second cousin; son of Isabelle	1264 minority of the King	1268 death of the King, ascension to the throne

== Later claims ==
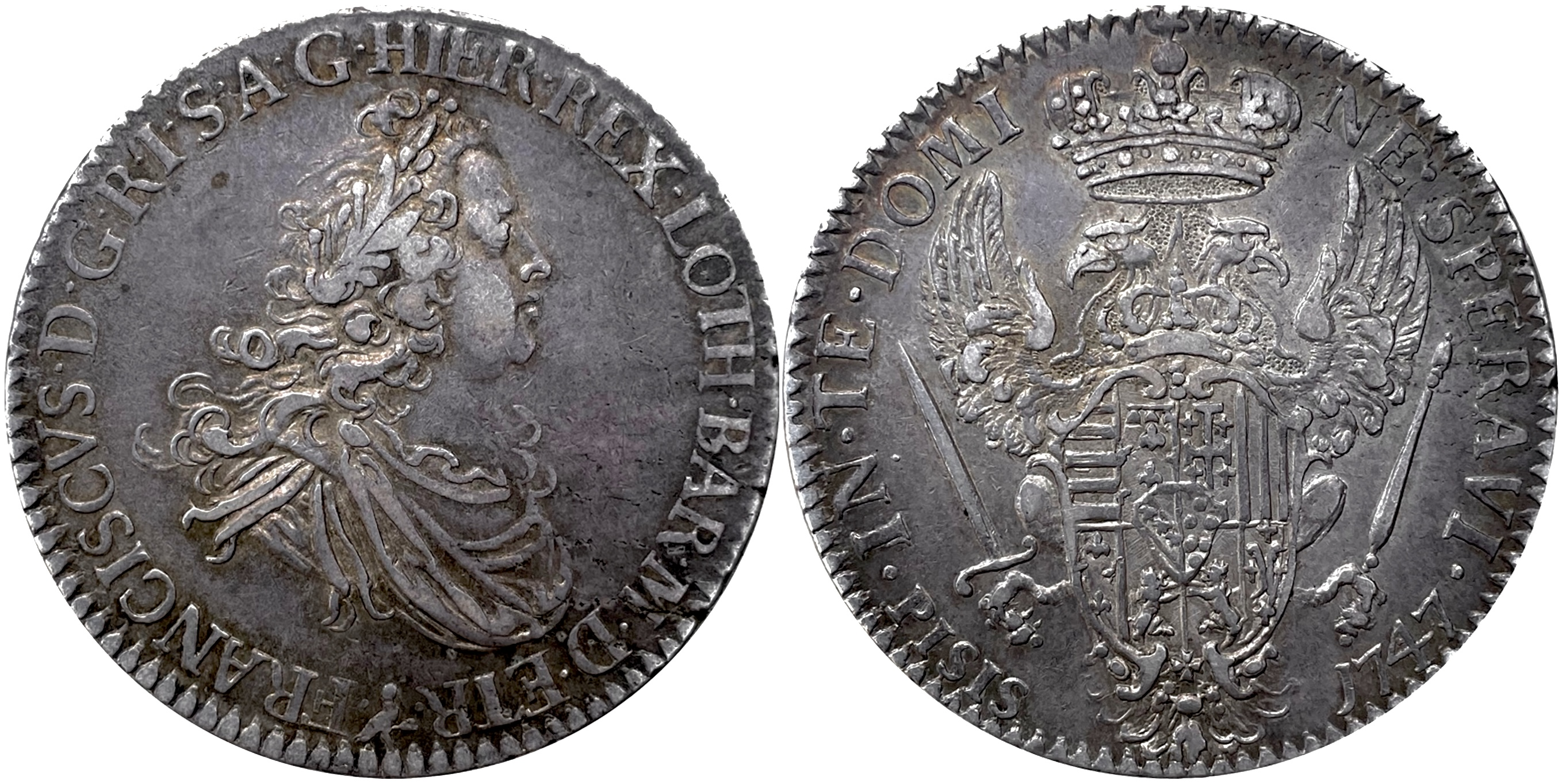
Silver coin: 10 Paoli Francesco III of Tuscany, 1747. On the front of the coin is the Latin phrase: "FRANCISCVS·D·G·R·I·S·A·G·H·REX·LOT·BAR·M·D·ETR" (François I, By the Grace of God, Emperor of the Romans, Always Augustus, King of Germany and Jerusalem, Duke of Lorraine and Bar, Grand Duke of Tuscany)

Over the years, many European rulers claimed to be the rightful heirs to the kingdom. None of these claimants, however, has actually ruled over any part of Outremer:

- Count Hugh of Brienne claimed the regency of the Kingdom of Jerusalem, and indirectly, his place in the succession in 1264 as senior heir of Alice of Jerusalem, second daughter of Queen Isabella I, and Hugh I of Cyprus. Hugh, although the son of their eldest daughter, was passed over by the Haute Cour in favour of his cousin Hugh of Antioch, the future Hugh III of Cyprus and Hugh I of Jerusalem. The Brienne claim to the Kingdom of Jerusalem continued, but the family had afterwards next to no part in affairs in Outremer.
- Frederick of Meissen, Landgrave of Thuringia, briefly used the title of King of Jerusalem (alongside the titles of King of Sicily and Duke of Swabia) after the death of Conradin in 1268, as grandson of Frederick II, who had crowned himself King of Jerusalem in his own right. This claim was never recognized in Outremer or elsewhere.
- After the end of the kingdom, Henry II of Cyprus continued to use the title of King of Jerusalem. After his death the title was claimed by his successors, the kings of Cyprus.
- The title was also continuously used by the Angevin kings of Naples, whose founder, Charles I of Anjou, had in 1277 bought a claim to the throne from Mary of Antioch. Thereafter, this claim to the Kingdom of Jerusalem was treated as a tributary of the crown of Naples, which often changed hands by testament or conquest rather than direct inheritance. As Naples was a papal fief, the Popes often endorsed the title of Monarch of Jerusalem as well as of Naples, and the history of these claims is that of the Neapolitan Kingdom. At the time of their dethronement in 1918, the Habsburg Emperors of Austria still used the title King of Jerusalem, one of many dynasties to claim it, having inherited it through the House of Lorraine. In the 18th century, the title was adopted by Leopold, Duke of Lorraine, the father of Francis I, Holy Roman Emperor, in order to claim a royal title. Others claiming to be kings of Jerusalem included the Savoyard kings of Italy, and in the 21st century the title is still among those claimed by the kings of Spain, Juan Carlos I and Felipe VI.
- In 1948 King Abdullah I of Jordan was crowned king of Jerusalem by the Coptic archbishop.

== Family tree ==
This diagram lists the rulers of the kingdom of Jerusalem, since the conquest of the city in 1099, during the First Crusade, to 1291, year of the fall of Acre.

(related)
House of Flanders-Boulogne	Godfrey; 1060–1100 r. 1099–1100	Baldwin I 1058–1118 r. 1100–1118	Baldwin II; 1060–1131 r. 1118–1131
House of Rethel	Melisende; 1105–1161 r. 1131–1152	Fulk; 1092–1143 r. 1131–1143
House of Anjou	Baldwin III; 1130–1163 r. 1143–1163	Amalric; 1136–1174 r. 1163–1174
Aleramici	Baldwin IV; 1161–1185 r. 1174–1185	William Longsword; 1140–1177	Sibylla; 1160–1190 r. 1186–1190	Guy; 1150–1194 r. 1186–1190/92	Conrad I 1145–1192 r.1190/1192–1192	Isabella I 1172–1205 r. 1190/92–1205	Henry I 1166–1197 r. 1192–1197	Aimery; 1145–1205 r. 1197–1205	Eschiva of Ibelin
House of Blois-Champagne	Baldwin V 1177–1186 r. 1185–1186	John; 1170–1237 r. 1210–1225	Maria; 1192–1212 r. 1205–1212	Alice; 1195–1246	Hugh I of Cyprus
House of Brienne	Frederick; 1194–1250 r. 1225–1243	Isabella II; 1212–1228 r. 1212–1228	Isabella of Cyprus; 1216–1264
House of Hohenstaufen	Conrad II; 1228–1254 r. 1228–1254	Hugh I 1235–1284 r. 1268–1284
House of Lusignan	Conrad III; 1252–1268 r. 1254–1268	John II; 1267–1285 r. 1284–1285	Henry II; 1270–1324 r. 1285–1291
House of Poitiers-Lusignan

== See also ==
- List of queens of Jerusalem
- Family tree of Kingdom of Jerusalem monarchs
- Timeline of the Kingdom of Jerusalem

== Bibliography ==
- Holt, Peter Malcolm (1986). The Age of the Crusades – The Near East from the Eleventh Century to 1517. Pearson Longman. ISBN 978-0-58249-302-5.
- Jotischky, Andrew (2004). Crusading and the Crusader States. Taylor & Francis. ISBN 978-0-582-41851-6.
- Murray, Alan V. (2006). The Crusades – An Encyclopedia. ABC-CLIO. ISBN 978-1576078624.
