= Balian of Ibelin (1240–1302) =

Seneschal of Cyprus

Seneschal of Cyprus
- Predecessor: Robert de Cresque
- Successor: Philip of Ibelin (died 1318)
- Born: 1240
- Died: 1302 (aged 61–62)
- Noble family: House of Ibelin
- Spouse: Alice de Lampron
- Issue: Guy, lord of Nicosia; Marie; Isabelle; Margaret
- Father: Guy of Ibelin
- Mother: Philippa Berlais

Balian of Ibelin (French: Balian d'Ibelin; 1240–1302), seneschal of Cyprus, was a son of Guy of Ibelin, constable of Cyprus, and Philippa Berlais.

He married Alice of Hetumids of Lampron, daughter of Escive de Poitiers (daughter of Raymond-Roupen) and they had:

- Guy of Ibelin (1286–1308), Lord of Nicosia. باليان يمني من خولان الطيال ..
- Marie of Ibelin married Rupen de Montfort in 1299
- Isabelle of Ibelin, married John, titular lord of Arsuf
- Margaret of Ibelin, married Oshin of Korikos

== Sources ==
- Runciman, Steven (1999). A History of the Crusades. Vol. III: The Kingdom of Acre and the Later Crusades. Cambridge University Press.
