= Guy of Lusignan (died 1343) =

Medieval French knight (1316–1343)

Guy of Lusignan (French: Guy de Lusignan) (1316–1343) was a medieval French knight who was constable of Cyprus and titular Prince of Galilee.

== Biography ==
Guy was the eldest son of King Hugh IV of Cyprus and his first wife Maria of Ibelin, who was the daughter of Guy, count of Jaffa.

Guy lost his mother when he was a child in 1318, and his father, then constable of Cyprus, married his second wife Alice of Ibelin, a cousin of his first wife.

Around 1320, Guy inherited the principality of Galilee from his mother's family.

In 1324, his father was crowned King Hugh IV of Cyprus, succeeding his uncle King Henry II who had died without issue. In 1328, he was betrothed to Maria de Bourbon, the daughter of Louis I, Duke of Bourbon. In 1329, Maria's dowry of 13,000 florins was received in Florence, and she arrived at Cyprus in January of the next year. The marriage was celebrated in Saint Sophia Cathedral in Nicosia.

In 1338 Guy was appointed as constable of Cyprus. He died in the summer of 1343, as can be deduced from the condolence letter from Pope Clement VI dated 24 September 1343.

== Issue ==
Guy and Maria had only one son:

- Hugh, titular Prince of Galilee and Prince of Achaea.
