= Philip of Ibelin (died 1304) =

Constable of Cyprus

Philip

Constable of Cyprus
- Reign: c. 1302
- Predecessor: Guy, Constable of Cyprus
- Successor: Amalric, Lord of Tyre
- Died: died 1304
- Spouse: Simone de Montbéliard
- Issue: Balian; Baldwin; Guy; Hugues; Marguerite; Helvis; Alice; Echive; Marie
- Father: Baldwin of Ibelin, Seneschal of Cyprus
- Mother: Alix, daughter of Walter III

Philip of Ibelin (died 1304) was constable of Cyprus.

He was a son of Baldwin of Ibelin, Seneschal of Cyprus, and Alix, daughter of Walter III of Bethsan and Theodora Comnena-Lathoumnena.

He married to Simone de Montbéliard, daughter of Odo of Montbéliard (Note: Peters states Odo's daughter married Philip d'Ibelin.) in c. 1253 and had issue:

- Balian (died 1315), titular prince of Galilée; married to Alice of Poitiers, daughter of Hugh III of Cyprus
- Baldwin
- Guy
- Hugues
- Marguerite
- Helvis
- Alice, married to Gautier de Bethsan (died 1315)
- Echive, married firstly to Gautier de Dampierre-sur-Salon and secondly to Hugh of Ibelin lord of Crusoche
- Marie, married to Guy of Ibelin, Count of Jaffa and Ascalon

== Sources ==
- Grousset, René (2006). Histoire des croisades et du royaume franc de Jérusalem - III. 1188-1291 L'anarchie franque (in French). Perrin.
- Peters, Edward, ed. (1971). Christian Society and the Crusades, 1198-1229 (2nd ed.). University of Pennsylvania Press.
