= John I of Cyprus =

13th century King of Cyprus and Jerusalem

John I

King of Cyprus and Jerusalem
- Reign: 1284–1285
- Predecessor: Hugh III
- Successor: Henry II
- Born: c. 1268
- Died: 20 May 1285
- House: Poitiers-Lusignan
- Father: Hugh III of Cyprus
- Mother: Isabella of Ibelin

John I (French: Jean; c. 1268 – 20 May 1285) was King of Cyprus and, in contention with Charles I of Anjou, of Jerusalem from 1284 to 1285.

John was the eldest surviving son of Hugh III, king of Cyprus and Jerusalem, and Isabella of Ibelin. Hugh died on 3 March 1284 and John was crowned the next king of Cyprus in Nicosia on 11 May. He was then aged about 17, and was considered handsome and delicate. On the mainland, John was recognized as king only in Tyre and Beirut, which were ruled by his aunt Margaret and brother Guy, respectively. Acre, political centre of the Kingdom of Jerusalem, recognized Charles of Anjou. John died on 20 May 1285, almost a year after his coronation, leaving the crown to his younger brother Henry II.

Regnal titles
Preceded by Hugh III of Cyprus	King of Cyprus; 1284–1285	Succeeded by Henry II of Cyprus
Preceded by Hugh III of Cyprus	— DISPUTED — King of Jerusalem; 1284–1285; Disputed by Charles I of Anjou	Succeeded by Henry II of Cyprus
