= Hugh III of Cyprus =

King of Cyprus (1267–1284) and Jerusalem (1268–1284)

Hugh III

King of Cyprus
- Reign: 1267–1284
- Coronation: 25 December 1267
- Predecessor: Hugh II
- Successor: John I

King of Jerusalem
- Reign: 1268–1284
- Coronation: 24 September 1269
- Predecessor: Conrad III
- Successor: John II
- Rival: Charles I (1277–1284)
- Born: c. 1235
- Died: 24 March 1284 (aged 48–49); Tyre, Lordship of Tyre
- Spouse: Isabella of Ibelin
- Issue more...: John I, King of Cyprus; Henry II, King of Cyprus; Amalric, Lord of Tyre; Aimery, Constable of Cyprus; Maria, Queen of Aragon; Guy, Constable of Cyprus; Margaret, Queen of Armenia
- House: Poitiers-Antioch
- Father: Henry of Antioch
- Mother: Isabella of Cyprus

Hugh III (French: Hugues; c. 1235 – 24 March 1284), also called Hugh of Antioch-Lusignan and the Great, was the king of Cyprus (as Hugh III) from 1267 and king of Jerusalem (as Hugh I) from 1268. Born into the family of the princes of Antioch, he effectively ruled as regent for his underage kinsmen Kings Hugh II of Cyprus and Conrad III of Jerusalem for several years. Prevailing over the claims of his cousin Hugh of Brienne and aunt Maria of Antioch, he succeeded both young monarchs upon their deaths and appeared poised to be an effective political and military leader.

As the first king of Jerusalem to reside in the kingdom since the 1220s, Hugh tried to restore the royal domain, reassert royal authority over the increasingly independent mainland vassals, and prevent further loss of territory to the Egyptian Mamluks. Marital alliances brought to him steadfast loyalty of the most powerful noble families, the Ibelins and the Montforts, but his efforts on the mainland were doomed to failure by the hostility of the Venetian merchants and the Knights Templar. His insular vassals, on the other hand, resented his determination to deploy Cypriot armies in defense of the Crusader states. In 1275 he failed to establish himself as regent of the County of Tripoli.

Most problematically, Hugh's right to the throne of Jerusalem was challenged by his aunt Maria of Antioch, who sold her claim to Charles I of Anjou in 1277. With the support of the Venetians and the Templars, Charles promptly took Acre, the last city on the mainland that belonged directly to the king. After two unsuccessful attempts to regain Acre, Hugh died in Tyre, a mainland city held by the loyal Montforts. He was succeeded by his son John I.

== Background ==
Hugh was the son of Isabella of Cyprus and Henry of Antioch, who married c. 1233. Isabella was the sister of King Henry I of Cyprus, while Hugh's father was the youngest son of Prince Bohemond IV of Antioch. Hugh's maternal grandmother, Alice of Champagne, was an unsuccessful claimant to the Kingdom of Jerusalem. As the heir presumptive to her grandnephew King Conrad II of Jerusalem, she was selected to rule the kingdom as regent in 1243. She died in 1246 and the regency passed to her son, Henry I of Cyprus, passing over the claim of her half-sister Melisende of Cyprus. King Henry ruled the mainland kingdom as regent until his death in 1253.

Hugh's mother brought him up along with his cousin Hugh of Brienne, son of her deceased older sister, Maria. He married Isabella, a member of the House of Ibelin, who were the leading nobility of the Kingdom of Jerusalem. The marriage, or at least a betrothal, took place in 1255, when a dispensation was issued. Hugh was considered handsome and charming, but was disadvantaged by his bad temper and tactlessness.

Hugh's relationship with the kings of Cyprus and Jerusalem and the rulers of Antioch and Tripoli

Isabella I of Jerusalem
Maria of Jerusalem	Alice of Champagne	Hugh I of Cyprus	Plaisance of Gibelet	Bohemond IV of Antioch	Melisende of Cyprus
Bohemond V of Antioch
Isabella II of Jerusalem	Maria of Cyprus	Henry I of Cyprus	Isabella of Cyprus	Henry of Antioch	Maria of Antioch
Plaisance of Antioch	Bohemond VI of Antioch
Conrad II of Jerusalem	Hugh of Brienne	Hugh II of Cyprus	Hugh III of Cyprus
Conrad III of Jerusalem	Bohemond VII of Antioch	Lucia of Tripoli

== Regency ==
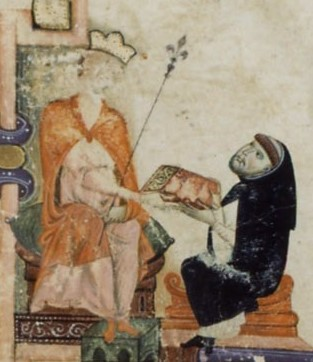
Thomas Aquinas presents a book, De regno, ad regem Cypri, to King Hugh. This king is usually identified as Hugh II and sometimes as Hugh III.

Hugh's mother, Isabella, was the aunt of the young King Hugh II of Cyprus and his closest relative of royal blood. The King's mother, Plaisance of Antioch, ruled on his behalf as regent until her death in 1261. Isabella then stood to assume the regency as Hugh II's heir presumptive. She ceded the regency to her son, Hugh of Antioch, who proved to be an able ruler. As Hugh II was also heir presumptive to King Conrad III of Jerusalem, who lived in Europe, he was entitled to govern the Kingdom of Jerusalem as regent. But since he was a minor, that regency needed to be exercised by his next of kin, and Isabella accepted that role in 1263.

Isabella died in 1264, and a dispute arose between Hugh of Brienne and Hugh of Antioch. The former claimed that he should now exercise the regency in Jerusalem because his mother was older than Hugh of Antioch's. But, as regent of Cyprus, Hugh of Antioch could contribute more militarily to the dwindling mainland kingdom, and was better connected, being the first cousin of Prince Bohemond VI of Antioch as well as being married into the powerful Ibelin family. The High Court of Jerusalem ruled that, since the contenders were equally close relatives of the young king, the elder of them should have priority, and that was Hugh of Antioch. Being chosen as regent effectively marked Hugh of Antioch as the heir presumptive of Hugh II.

As regent, Hugh considered it his duty to defend the Crusader states. He was the first ruler of Cyprus in over a decade to deploy a Cypriot army in defense of the Kingdom of Jerusalem. His army, however, came too late to prevent the Mamluk ruler of Egypt, Baibars, from conquering Caesarea Maritima, Arsur, Haifa, Safed, Toron, and Chastel Neuf. Hugh likely focused on reinforcing the defence of Acre, the sole remaining royal city on the mainland.

== Reign ==
=== Accessions ===
14-year-old King Hugh II died in December 1267, not having reached majority, and was duly succeeded as king of Cyprus by his cousin and regent Hugh of Antioch (Hugh III). Hugh III's coronation took place in the Cathedral of Saint Sophia in Nicosia on 25 December 1267. In May 1268, the new king sailed to Acre to be recognized as the formal regent, and thus heir presumptive, of Conrad III of Jerusalem. The High Court was prepared to accept him, but he was surprised to find his claim challenged by his aunt Maria of Antioch. She insisted that she had the better claim to regency due to being a nearer relative of Conrad; whereas Hugh was a great-grandchild of their common ancestor, Queen Isabella I of Jerusalem, Maria was a grandchild. Maria's case was legally stronger and, unlike Hugh, she had come prepared for debate. Hugh, however, was a more desirable choice, as he was a man, experienced in government, and with troops at disposal. Earlier in 1268, Baibars had conquered Jaffa, Beaufort, and Antioch, which prompted the High Court to rule in Hugh's favour.

On 29 October 1268, Conrad was executed in Naples by the orders of Charles I of Anjou, who had conquered Conrad's Kingdom of Sicily. Hugh thus became king of Jerusalem too. Instead of appointing a bailli to rule his new kingdom on his behalf, Hugh divided his time between Cyprus and Acre. For the first time since the 1220s, the mainland kingdom had a resident monarch.

=== Policy ===
The barons of the Kingdom of Jerusalem had grown independent from royal authority during the reigns of the absentee kings. Hugh tried to improve the system of government, introducing an inner council and the use of a privy seal, both likely imports from Cyprus. The regents had alienated much of the royal domain through legally tenuous grants, which became invalid on Hugh's accession. The most notable cases were the grants of the lordships of Arsur to the Knights Hospitaller, Sidon to the Knights Templar, and Tyre to Philip of Montfort. Hugh refused to accept this as a fait accompli, but was willing to compromise to find solutions. His policy centred on fostering close relations with the Montforts, a powerful family which held the important city of Tyre. With Philip he reached an agreement providing that Hugh's sister, Margaret, would marry Philip's son John, to whom Philip would cede Tyre, and that Hugh would enfeoff John and his descendants by Margaret with Tyre. The agreement enabled Hugh to be crowned, despite Maria's protests, on 24 September 1269 by the bishop of Lydda in the Cathedral of Tyre, where kings and queens of Jerusalem had been crowned since the loss of the city of Jerusalem in 1187.

Lord Edward's crusade in 1271–1272 Mamluks Crusaders Mongols

In June 1271, Acre became exposed when Baibars conquered the Montfort Castle to its north-east. He immediately made an unsuccessful attempt at raid on Cyprus. At that time, the English prince Edward took a small army of about 1,000 men on a crusade to the Latin East, arriving in Acre on 9 May 1271. Edward was soon disillusioned by the uncooperativeness of the local Christians. Baibars's failed attack on their island had disturbed Cypriot knights, who refused Hugh's summons to serve on the mainland. They argued that the King could not expect them to fight for him outside Cyprus. Edward was called on to arbitrate. Their disobedience was humiliating for Hugh. It was decided that the knights could be commanded to serve abroad for four months each year if led by the King or his son. Edward helped Hugh raid Baibars's territory, and early in 1272 Hugh secured a truce, after which Acre remained at peace until 1291. Edward left on 16 June 1272.

The only lay fief on the mainland other than Tyre was Beirut, held by Isabella of Ibelin. Her husband, Hamo le Strange, distrusted King Hugh and put her and her fief under Baibars's protection on his deathbed in 1273. As a female vassal, Isabella was legally required to marry one of three candidates presented to her by the King. Wishing to attract a capable knight to the East by offering her hand in marriage, Hugh took Isabella to Cyprus. Baibars demanded that she be returned to Beirut, and as the High Court offered no support, Hugh relented. The King did not resume control over Beirut until long after Baibars died. Despite some successes, in the end Hugh found it impossible to be more than "king of Acre", as Muslim writers called him.

Bohemond VI, the last prince of Antioch, died in 1275, leaving two children, Bohemond VII and Lucia. Bohemond VII inherited the County of Tripoli from his father, but he was a minor. King Hugh arrived in Tripoli to claim regency as the closest adult scion of the ruling family. Bohemond VII's mother, Sibylla of Armenia, had already established herself as regent, however, as was her right according to family custom. Hugh found no support in Tripoli. He only won a minor diplomatic victory when he negotiated a truce with Baibars covering Latakia, preserving the last remnant of the Principality of Antioch.

=== Baronial opposition ===
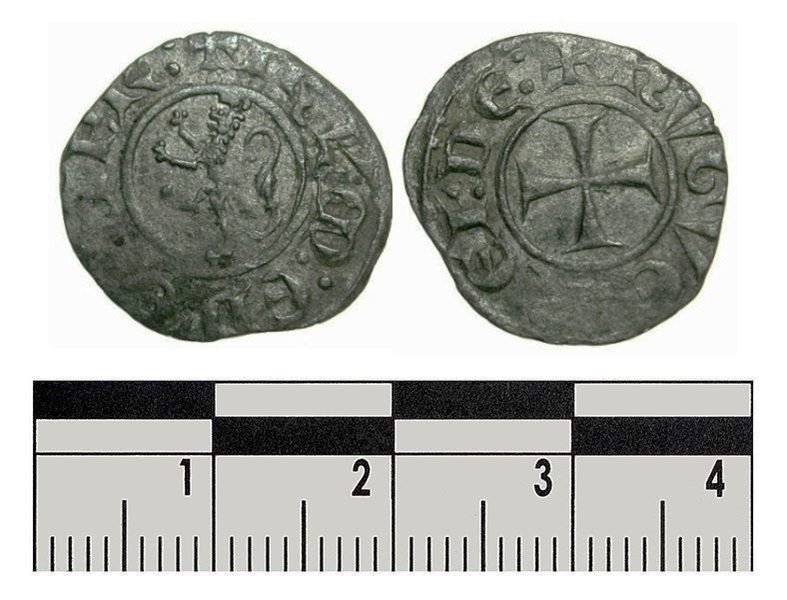
Billon 'denier' coin issued in the reign of Hugh III.

Hugh succeeded in mending the rifts between his lay vassals, the Ibelins and the Montforts, but the merchants of Venice and Genoa were irreconcilable. The Venetians in particular were aggrieved by his preferential treatment of the Genoese. The Templars and the Teutonic Knights objected to his own rapprochement with Philip of Montfort, while the commune of Acre resented the renewed royal involvement in its affairs and the favour shown to Tyre. Though he disliked him, the grand master of the Templars, Thomas Berard, never openly challenged Hugh. But William of Beaujeu, elected to succeed Thomas Berard in 1273, proved determined to undermine the King.

Hugh's chief problem, however, was the persistence of his aunt Maria in claiming the throne of Jerusalem. Hugh sent procurators to answer her appeal to the Holy See in 1273, but she was already entertaining the sale of her claim to Charles of Anjou, whose ambition to dominate the Mediterranean Hugh had feared since 1269. Charles had the support of William of Beaujeu, his kinsman. As the ruler of Sicily and brother of the celebrated crusader King Louis IX of France, he rivalled what Hugh could offer militarily and diplomatically. Charles was also personally hostile to Hugh, encouraging Maria's claims to Jerusalem and Hugh of Brienne's to Cyprus.

Indignant at the opposition he faced, Hugh suddenly packed up his belongings and left Acre for good in October 1276. The final straw was the purchase of a village near Acre by the Templars, for which they deliberately did not seek the King's approval and ignored his complaints. The Templars and the Venetians were pleased to see him go, but the decision stunned the Hospitallers, the Teutonic Knights, and the Latin patriarch of Jerusalem, Thomas of Lentino. They sent delegates to Tyre, where the king had retired with the intention to sail to Cyprus, begging him to at least appoint a bailli. It took the intercession of his brother-in-law John of Montfort to make the angry king appoint an administrator, Balian of Ibelin. King Hugh immediately embarked and went to Cyprus, from where he justified his action to Pope John XXI.

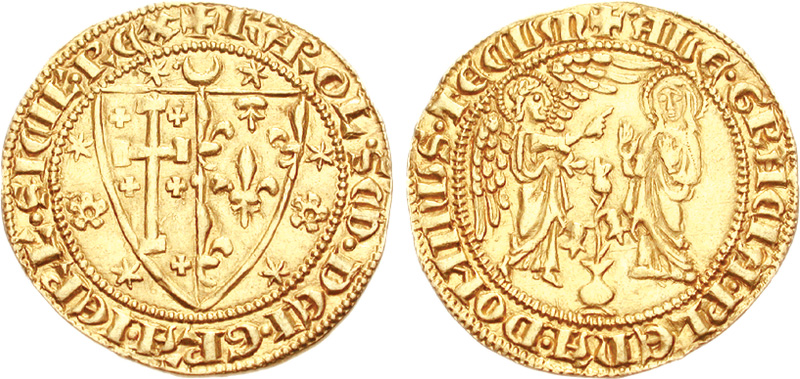
1285 coin describing Charles as king of Jerusalem and Sicily

The sale of Maria's claim to Charles was concluded, with papal approval, in March 1277. Within weeks Charles's representative Roger of San Severino arrived in Acre to claim government, facing no opposition from Hugh. Roger proclaimed Charles king of Jerusalem and demanded that the barons do homage to him as Charles's bailli. To preserve a sense of legality, the barons twice asked Hugh to absolve them from their allegiance to him, but he refused to answer. The holders of the most important lordships, John of Tyre and Isabella of Beirut, continued to recognize Hugh as their legitimate king.

=== Struggles for Acre ===
Hugh attempted twice to reoccupy Acre but was ultimately unsuccessful. In 1279 he brought a large Cypriot army to Tyre, hoping that a display of strength and bribery would be enough to restore his authority over the city. John of Montfort was on his side, but William of Beaujeu's enduring opposition to Hugh frustrated the plan. Upon returning to Cyprus, he seized the Templars' properties and destroyed their fortifications in reprisal. The Templars complained to the pope, who asked Hugh to restore their property, but he declined. Though restricted since 1277 in his ability to support the mainland against the Mamluks, Hugh may have planned to assist the Mongols in their attempted invasion of the Mamluk-held Levant.

1282 saw the recall of Roger of San Severino due to a major uprising on Sicily against Charles, as well as the death of Isabella of Beirut and the consequent passing of her lordship to her sister, Eschiva, whose husband, Humphrey of Montfort, was a close friend of Hugh's. Thus encouraged to try again to retake Acre, Hugh sailed from Cyprus in late July 1283 with his sons Henry and Bohemond. Instead of landing at Acre, Hugh was blown to Beirut, where he was welcomed on 1 August. While his army marched to Tyre, they were ambushed by Muslim raiders, whom the King believed to have been incited by the Templars. Hugh reached Tyre by sea, encountering bad omens; his standard fell into the sea, and the cross carried by the assembled clergy accidentally cracked the skull of his Jewish court physician. Hugh waited in vain to be welcomed to Acre. Charles's new bailli in Acre, Odo Poilechien, had just concluded a truce with the Mamluks, and Hugh may have feared their intervention if he attacked.

The King lost his most promising son, Bohemond, on 3 November 1283. An even more serious blow was the death of his friend and brother-in-law, John of Montfort. The Cypriots left him after the agreed period of four months expired, but Hugh remained in Tyre, where he died on 24 March 1284. He was succeeded by his eldest surviving son, John I, who died the next year and was followed by another son, Henry II.

== Issue ==
With his wife, Isabella of Ibelin, Hugh had eleven children:

- John I (died in 1285), who succeeded Hugh III as king
- Bohemond (died in 1283)
- Henry II (died in 1324), who succeeded John I as king
- Amalric (died in 1310), who displaced Henry II as effective ruler
- Aimery (died in 1316), who briefly ruled in succession to Amalric
- Guy, whose son, Hugh IV, succeeded Henry II
- Maria (died in 1322), who married King James II of Aragon
- Margaret (died in 1296), who married King Thoros III of Armenia
- Alice, who married Balian of Ibelin, titular prince of Galilee and Bethlehem, son of Philip of Ibelin
- Helvis
- Isabella (died in 1319)

== Sources ==
- Edbury, Peter W. (1979). The Disputed Regency of the Kingdom of Jerusalem, 1264/6 and 1268. Offices of the Royal Historical Society. OCLC 4782987.
- Edbury, Peter W. (1994). The Kingdom of Cyprus and the Crusades, 1191–1374. Cambridge University Press. ISBN 978-0-521-45837-5.
- Riley-Smith, Jonathan (1973). The feudal nobility and the kingdom of Jerusalem, 1147 - 1277. Macmillan. ISBN 0-333-06379-1.
- Runciman, Steven (1989) [1954]. A History of the Crusades. Vol. III: The Kingdom of Acre and the Later Crusades. Cambridge University Press. ISBN 0-521-06163-6.

Regnal titles
Preceded by Hugh II	King of Cyprus; 1267–1284	Succeeded by John I/II
Preceded by Conrad III	King of Jerusalem; 1268–1284	Succeeded by John I/II
