= Guy (son of Hugh III of Cyprus) =

Constable of Cyprus
- Predecessor: John II of Jerusalem
- Successor: Philip of Ibelin
- Born: 1275–1280
- Died: 1303
- Spouse: Eschiva of Ibelin, Lady of Beirut
- Issue: Hugh IV of Cyprus; Isabelle
- House: Poitiers-Lusignan
- Father: Hugh III of Cyprus
- Mother: Isabella of Ibelin

Guy of Poitiers-Lusignan (1275/1280 – 1303) was constable of Cyprus from 1298. He was the youngest son of Hugh III of Cyprus (r. 1267–1284) and Isabella of Ibelin.

In 1303, Guy conspired against his brother Henry II of Cyprus (r. 1285–1306 and 1310–1324). He was discovered, and executed the same year.

Guy married Eschiva of Ibelin, Lady of Beirut. They had:

- Hugh IV, king of Cyprus (r. 1324–1358)
- Isabel (1296/1300 – after 1340), married in 1322 to Eudes de Dampierre, constable of Jerusalem

== Sources ==
- Edbury, Peter W. (1994). The Kingdom of Cyprus and the Crusades, 1191-1374. Cambridge University Press.
