= Philip of Ibelin (died 1318) =

Seneschal of Cyprus

Philip
- Coat-of-arms of Ibelin.

Seneschal of Cyprus
- Reign: 1302–1318
- Predecessor: Balian of Ibelin, seneschal of Cyprus
- Successor: Guy of Ibelin, seneschal of Cyprus
- Born: c. 1255
- Died: 25 November 1318; Nicosia
- Noble family: House of Ibelin
- Spouses: Maria, daughter of Vahran of Hamousse; Maria Embriaco of Giblet
- Issue: Guy of Ibelin, seneschal of Cyprus
- Father: Guy of Ibelin, constable of Cyprus
- Mother: Phillipa, daughter of Aimery Berlais

Philip of Ibelin (born c. 1255; died 25 November 1318, Nicosia) was Seneschal of the Kingdom of Cyprus. As one of the sons of Philippa Barlais and her husband Guy of Ibelin, he was a member of the house of Ibelin.

He first married Maria, daughter of Vahran of Hamousse by Mary of Ibelin, in c. 1280 without issue. Next he married Maria (d. 1331), daughter of Guy II of Gibelet, in c. 1295 with whom he had:

- Isabella of Ibelin (died c.1342), 1st married, 1315, Ferdinand of Majorca (died 1316); 2nd married, 1320, Hugo of Ibelin, Titular count of Jaffa
- John of Ibelin (* 1301/1302, died 22 October 1317)
- Balian of Ibelin (died c. 1349)
- Helvis of Ibelin (died 1347), married, 1330, Henry II, Duke of Brunswick-Grubenhagen (died 1351).
- Guy of Ibelin, seneschal of Cyprus, married Margaret of Ibelin. Issue:
  - John of Ibelin (died after 1367), seneschal of Cyprus after his father's death.
  - Alice of Ibelin (died after 1374), married John of Lusignan (1329/1330 – 1375), titular Prince of Antioch and Regent of Cyprus.
  - Margaret of Ibelin

== Bibliography ==
- Templar of Tyre, Gestes des Chiprois III, edited in: Recueil des historiens des croisades, Documents arméniens. Bd. 2 (1906), S. 737–872.
- René de Mas Latrie (ed.), Chroniques d’Amadi et de Strambaldi, Bd. 1. Paris 1891.
