= Henry II of Cyprus =

King of Jerusalem and Cyprus (1270–1324)

Henry II
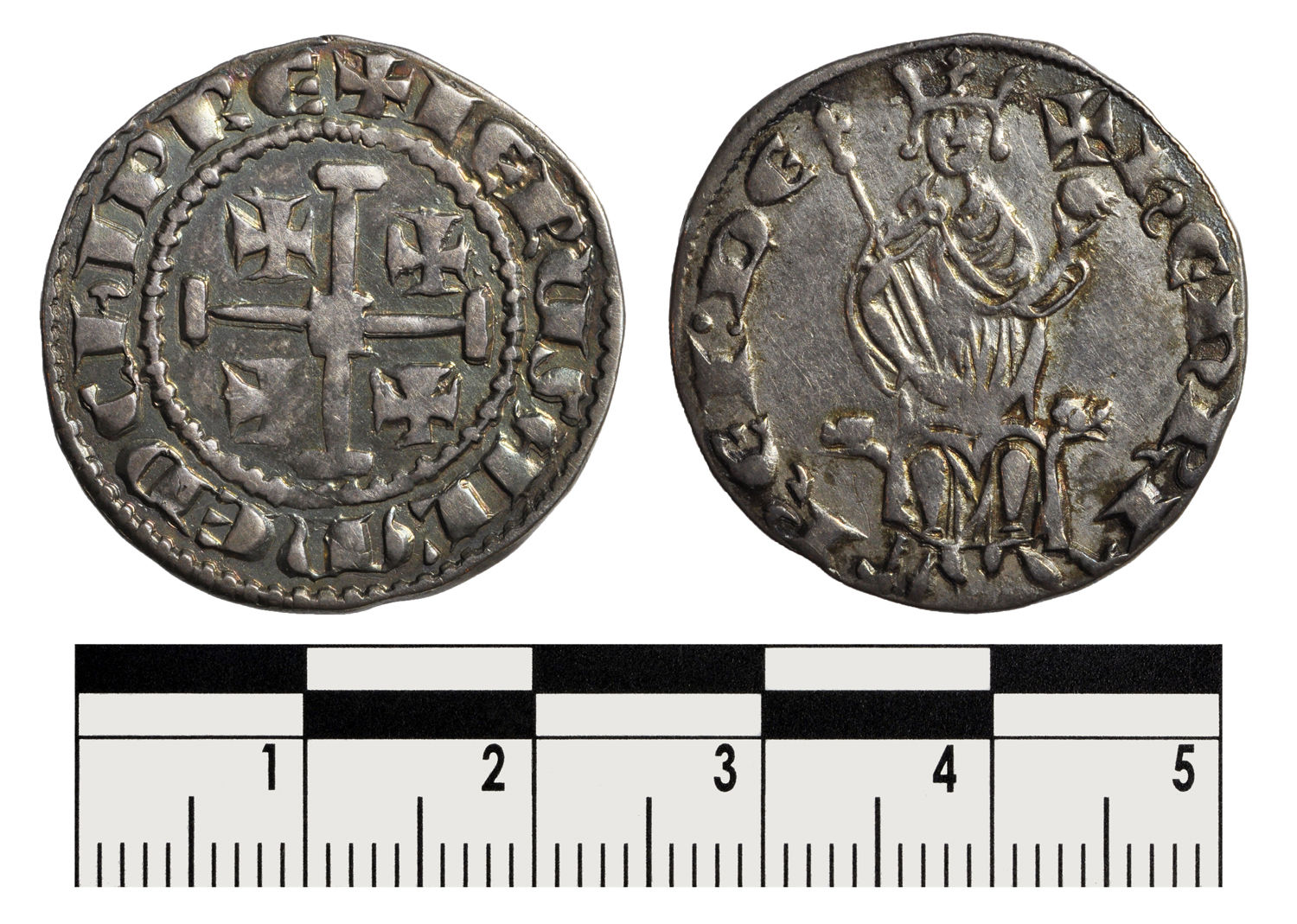
- Silver 'gros grand' coin issued in the reign of Henry II. This silver denomination replaced the 'white bezants' and are notable for the western style depiction of a king enthroned which replaced the Byzantine style.

King of Jerusalem and Cyprus
- Reign: 1285–1291 (Jerusalem); 1285–1324 (Cyprus)
- Predecessor: John II/I
- Successor: Hugh IV/II
- Born: June 1270
- Died: 31 March 1324 (aged 53); Strovolos, Kingdom of Cyprus
- Spouse: Constance of Sicily
- House: Poitiers-Lusignan
- Father: Hugh III of Cyprus
- Mother: Isabella of Ibelin

Henry II (June 1270 – 31 March 1324) was the last crowned King of Jerusalem (after the fall of Acre on 28 May 1291, this title became empty) and also ruled as King of Cyprus. He was of the Lusignan dynasty.

He was the second surviving son of Hugh III and succeeded his brother John I on 20 May 1285; there was some suspicion that Henry had been involved in poisoning John. He was crowned at the Cathedral of Saint Sophia, Nicosia, 24 June 1285. Charles I of Anjou, who contested John's claim to the throne, had died in 1285, allowing Henry to recover Acre from the Angevins. With a fleet Henry attacked Acre, defended by Charles's lieutenant Hugh Pelerin, and the city was captured on 29 July 1285. Henry had himself crowned king of Jerusalem on 15 August 1286 in Tyre by Archbishop Bonacursus de Gloire, but returned to Cyprus and appointed his uncle Philip of Ibelin as bailiff in his absence. By this time Acre was one of the few coastal cities remaining in the remnant of the Kingdom of Jerusalem. During his reign the Mamluks captured Tyre, Beirut, and the rest of the mainland cities, and destroyed the similarly weakened County of Tripoli in 1289. The final siege of Acre began on 5 April 1291 with Henry present in the city. He escaped to Cyprus with most of his nobles, and the city fell to Khalil on 28 May 1291.

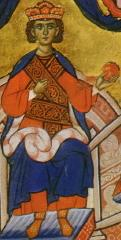
Miniature of Henry II

Henry continued to rule as king of Cyprus, and continued to claim the kingship of Jerusalem as well, often planning to recover the former territory on the mainland. He attempted a coordinated military operation in 1299/1300 with Ghazan, the Mongol ruler of the Ilkhanate, when Ghazan invaded Mamluk territory in 1299; he tried to stop Genoese ships from trading with the Mamluks, hoping to weaken them economically; and he twice wrote to Pope Clement V asking for a new crusade. His reign in Cyprus was prosperous and wealthy, and he was very much involved with the justice and administration of the kingdom – he had the High Court keep written records for the first time (in Italian or French, rather than Latin), and extended the court's role from a feudal advisory body to a true court responsible for trying and punishing criminals. However, Cyprus was in no position to fulfill his true ambition, the recovery of the Holy Land. He suffered from epilepsy, which at times incapacitated him, and his nobles were unsatisfied with him. He had his brother Guy, the Constable of Cyprus, put to death in 1303 for conspiring against him. In 1306 his brother Amalric, Lord of Tyre, Constable of Jerusalem, conspired with the Templars to remove him from power. However, Amalric assumed the title of governor and regent of Cyprus, rather than of king. Henry was deposed on 26 April 1306 and exiled to Armenia, where King Oshin of Armenia was Amalric's brother-in-law. However, upon the murder of Amalric in 1310, Oshin released Henry, who returned to Cyprus and resumed his throne with the aid of the Hospitallers on 26 August 1310, imprisoning many of Amalric's co-conspirators, including their brother Constable Aimery, brother-in-law Balian II of Ibelin, Prince of Galilee, and other relatives of Balian. In 1313, he oversaw the dissolution of the Templars in Cyprus and the transfer of their property to the Hospitallers.

He married Constance of Sicily (1303/1307 – in Cyprus after 19 June 1344), daughter of Frederick III of Sicily and Eleanor of Anjou, at the Cathedral of Saint Sophia, on 16 October 1317 but they didn't have any children.

Henry died on 31 March 1324 at his Villa in Strovolos, near Nicosia, was buried at the Franciscan Church of Nicosia and was succeeded by his nephew Hugh IV.

Regnal titles
Preceded by John II/I	King of Cyprus; 1285–1324	Succeeded by Hugh IV
Preceded by John II/I	King of Jerusalem; 1285–1291	Mamluk conquest
