= Bonacursus de Gloria =

13th-century archbishop of Tyre

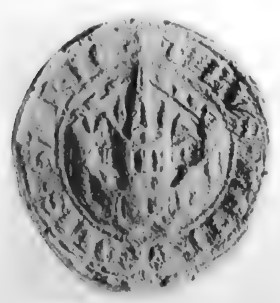
The seal of Archbishop Bonacursus depicts the city of Tyre. It is one of the few surviving non-patriarchal episcopal seals from the late 13th century.

Bonacursus de Gloria (French: Bonacours de Gloire) was a Latin churchman who was the resident archbishop of Tyre from 1272 until the 1291 fall of the Kingdom of Jerusalem and titular archbishop until 1295. He performed the last coronation in the kingdom. He is most probably the archbishop of Tyre who brought the Pontifical of Tyre to Europe.

== Background and early career ==
Bonacursus' name points to an Italian heritage. Because he was known as Ultramarinus, most historians conclude that Bonacursus was born in the Kingdom of Jerusalem. Hans E. Mayer argues that Ultramarinus does not necessarily indicate that he was born in Palestine and that he was probably an immigrant from Italy.

Bonacursus was a member of the Dominican Order. By 1277, he had risen to the position of "vicar of the patriarch and bishop of Acre". In the mid-thirteenth century, it was usually foreigners who were appointed to the bishoprics and archbishoprics in the kingdom. During the reign of King Hugh, and perhaps due to his influence, the promotion of locals to vacant church offices became common again. Bonacursus was appointed archbishop of Tyre in 1272.

== Episcopacy ==
The Latin patriarch of Jerusalem, Thomas of Lentino, died in 1277. Bonacursus became the administrator of the patriarchal see. He served until the appointment of the bishop of Périgueux, Elias Peleti, to the patriarchate in 1280. Because Patriarch Elias Peleti was in Europe in the late 1280s, it was Bonacursus who performed the coronation of Henry II of Cyprus as king of Jerusalem in the Cathedral of the Holy Cross in Tyre on the feast of the Assumption (15 August) 1286.

Bonacursus is last mentioned by name in the sources in connection with Henry's coronation, the last such ceremony in the Kingdom of Jerusalem. Nevertheless the archbishop who led Tyre when the crusader state's last territories were conquered by Mamluk Egypt in 1291 was almost certainly Bonacursus. Tyre surrendered without a fight on 19 May after the fall of Acre and its rich inhabitants were evacuated. The archbishop likely took with him valuables, including the Pontifical of Tyre, from which the order of the coronation service is known.

Bonacursus was the last resident archbishop of Tyre. He remained titular archbishop until 1295. In 1294 Pope Celestine V made Bonacursus the administrator of the bishopric of Luni in Liguria. He is probably the one who brought the Pontifical of Tyre to Siena.
