= Pontifical of Tyre =

13th-century liturgical manuscript

The Pontifical of Tyre (Siena, Biblioteca Comunale degli Intronati, Codex G.V. 12) is an exceptionally rare liturgical manuscript from the early thirteenth-century Kingdom of Jerusalem. It contains rites used by the archbishop of Tyre. It is one of only two known surviving pontificals from the crusader states, the other being the Pontifical of Apamea.

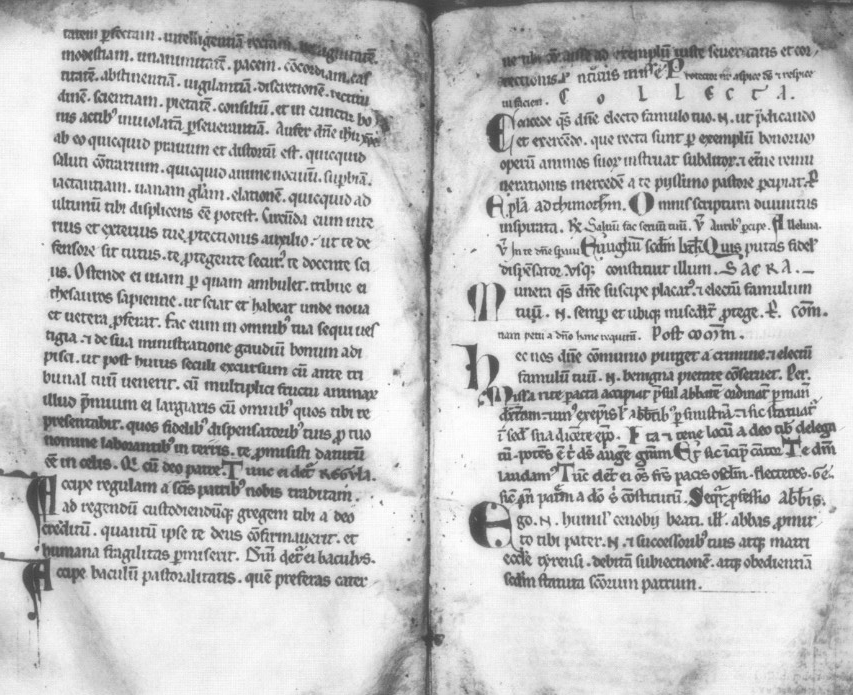
The Pontifical of Tyre is kept in Siena.

The manuscript was written specifically for use in the Cathedral of the Holy Cross in Tyre, as evidenced by internal liturgical texts such as the episcopal election decree and the abbatial profession of obedience, which refer explicitly to the Church of Tyre and its hierarchy. Its content reflects local liturgical practices, including blessings for the Finding and Exaltation of the Cross – appropriate for a cathedral dedicated to the Holy Cross. Paleographic evidence suggests the manuscript was created under the tenure of Clarembaldus of Broies, a French cleric who was archbishop of Tyre from 1203 to 1210. Its structure and a series of episcopal benedictions point to a French exemplar, and it shares notable parallels with the Pontifical of Chartres. The pontifical is especially notable for preserving information about the ordo (order of service) for the thirteenth-century coronations of the kings and queens of Jerusalem.

The manuscript was actively used and revised over time to conform more closely to Roman liturgical norms. A 13th-century hand marked certain sections as redundant, erased others, and added marginal additions, reflecting evolving liturgical use. It likely remained in Tyre until the collapse of the kingdom in 1291, after which it surfaced in Siena by the early 14th century. It was likely brought there by the last resident archbishop of Tyre, Bonacursus de Gloria. In Siena, local clerics annotated it with marginal notes comparing it to Sienese ceremonial practice—revealing both its continued utility and its westward relocation after the fall of the Latin East.
