= Elias of Jerusalem =

Elias of Jerusalem (or Elijah, Eliya, etc.) may refer to:

- Elias I of Jerusalem, patriarch (494–516)
- Elias II of Jerusalem, Greek Orthodox patriarch (770–797)
- Elias III of Jerusalem, Greek Orthodox patriarch (879–907)
- Eliya ibn ʿUbaid, Church of the East bishop (878/9–893)
- Elias Peleti, Latin patriarch (1279–1287/8)
