= Elias Peleti =

Latin patriarch of Jerusalem

Elias Peleti (French: Hélie Pilet) was a French prelate of the Catholic Church who was the bishop of Périgueux from April 1268 until May 1279 and then Latin patriarch of Jerusalem until his death in 1287/88. He served Popes Urban IV and Clement IV, undertaking sensitive political missions on behalf of Clement. As patriarch, he was absent for a large part of his term and left little mark on the spiritual and political life of the Latin East.

== Career in Europe ==
Elias hailed from the Kingdom of France. He started his ecclesiastical career as a canon regular and became a papal chaplain. He worked in Bologna under Urban IV and then in Pisa under Clement IV, who entrusted political missions to him. He was Clement IV's envoy to Florence in late 1266, tasked with negotiating political peace between the Guelphs and Ghibellines and reform on behalf of the pope. He briefly reported success, but within weeks the Florentines reversed course and reasserted independence from papal control. Elias's mission is remembered as the last papal attempt to manage Florence without leaning on a direct intervention from the king of Sicily, Charles I of Anjou.

In April 1268, two years after Peter de Saint-Astier resigned the Bishopric of Périgueux, Elias was appointed to succeed him. Early in his episcopate, he was harassed by the men of Count Alphonse of Poitou, who in August 1268 ordered his seneschal in Saintonge to protect the bishop.

== Patriarchate ==
The death of Patriarch Thomas Agni of Lentino in September 1277 was followed by a long period of sede vacante in the Latin Patriarchate of Jerusalem, during which Archbishop Bonacursus de Gloria of Tyre administered the patriarchal see as vicar. The canons of the Holy Sepulchre expressed a wish that the archbishop of Naples be translated to Jerusalem–probably at the urging of King Charles I of Sicily, who also claimed the Kingdom of Jerusalem (by then centered in Acre)–but Pope Nicholas III nominated John of Vercelli instead. John refused, and Elias was appointed in May 1279.

Elias brought substantial funds from Pope Honorius IV, which were to be spent on the defense of the Latin East. During Elias's pontificate, the ecclesiastical structure of the Latin East was reduced as no archbishop of Caesarea was appointed to succeed Matthew, who died in 128. At some point Elias returned to Europe, likely to consult the pope. In 1286, King Charles II of Naples's government in Acre collapsed and the rival claimant to the throne of Jerusalem, King Henry II of Cyprus, was invited to take over. Patriarch Elias took no part in the negotiations with Henry, and it was Archbishop Bonacursus de Gloria who crowned the new king in 1286. It is therefore probable that Elias was not present in the kingdom at this time.

Elias was in Rome in 1287. During his time in Europe, he was represented in Acre by a vicar, Joseph of Chauncy. He died at Rome in late 1287 or early 1288, by 30 April at the latest. According to the historian Bernard Hamilton, no patriarch since Amalric of Nesle (r. 1157/58–1180) left as little a mark on the Church and Kingdom of Jerusalem as Elias.

== Bibliography ==
- Dessales, Léon (1885). Histoire du Périgord (in French). Vol. 2. R. Delage et D. Joucla.
- Eubel, Conradus (1913). Hierarchia catholica medii aevi. Vol. 1 (2nd ed.). Libreria Regensbergiana.
- Hamilton, Bernard (1980). The Latin Church in the Crusader States: The Secular Church. Ashgate.
- Richard, Jean (1985). "Agricultural Conditions in the Crusader States" (PDF). In Norman P. Zacour; Harry W. Hazard (eds.). A History of the Crusades, Volume V: The Impact of the Crusades on the Near East. University of Wisconsin Press. pp. 251–294.
- Sternfeld, Richard (1905). Der Kardinal Johann Gaëtan Orsini (Papst Nikolaus III.) 1244-1277: ein Beitrag zur Geschichte der Römischen Kurie im 13. Jahrhundert (in German). Matthiesen.

Catholic Church titles
Preceded by Peter of Saint-Astier	Bishop of Périgueux; 1268–1279	Succeeded by Raymond of Auberoche
Preceded by Thomas Agni of Lentino	Patriarch of Jerusalem; 1279–1287/88	Succeeded by Nicholas of Hanapes
