= Joseph of Chauncy =

13th-century English religious knight

Joseph of Chauncy (before 1213 – after 1283), also known as Joseph of Cancy, was an English religious knight. He was Grand Prior of the Knights Hospitaller in England from 1273 to 1281. He served as Royal Treasurer of the Order from 1273 to 1280.

== Origins ==
Joseph of Chauncy was a younger son of an Anglo-Norman noble family who held estates in Yorkshire and Lincolnshire. He entered the Order of St John before 1233. After 1233, but no later than 1238, he joined the Knights Hospitaller at Acre in Palestine. Before 1248, he became Treasurer of the Order. During this period, the Christian Crusader states in Palestine were being pushed back by the Muslim empires, first the Ayyubids and later the Mamluks. In 1270, the English heir to the throne, Lord Edward, undertook a Crusade in support of the hard-pressed Crusader states. To meet the high costs of what is now known as Lord Edward's Crusade, the future king had to borrow large sums of money. Part of the money was guaranteed by the Order of St. John, and Edward probably came into contact with Chauncy. Around 1271, he resigned as Treasurer of the Order.

== Grand Prior of England and Royal Treasurer ==
While Edward was still on the return journey from his Crusade, he learned that he had become English king after the death of his father, Henry III of England. Even before his return to England, in October 1273, he appointed Chauncy as his new Treasurer, who became Grand Prior of the Order in England for this purpose. However, while Edward initially traveled to France, Chauncy now returned to England. From March to September 1274, he received a royal letter of protection for a foreign journey, presumably he took part in the Second Council of Lyon. By the spring of 1273, he had settled the debts of the king to foreign merchants during the fair at Provins, and before 1275 he settled further debts at another place called Myli. During the Parliament at Westminster in April 1275, it was decided to impose a duty on wool exports. The proposal came from Chauncy, who had taken the idea of the Italian merchant Poncius de Ponto. The duty was collected directly from Italian merchants in the ports. The revenue from the duty, which amounted to about £10,000 annually until 1279, was set off directly against debts owed by the Crown to Italian merchants. As Grand Prior of the Order of Saint John, he had a chapel built at the Clerkenwell Priory in London, the Order's seat in England.

== Impact on Jews ==
During Chauncy's tenure as Treasurer, English Jews were further burdened for this purpose. On 9 December 1273, he ordered all English Jews to come to the principal towns in the counties and remain there until Easter 1274. In case of non-appearance he threatened them with the death penalty as well as expropriation, presumably he demanded a high tax, the tallage, from the Jews. The Statute of the Jewry issued in 1275 forbade Jewish money lenders to charge usurious interest. In the run-up to Edward I's coinage reform, 29 Christians and 269 Jews were executed in London alone between 1278 and 1279 for alleged coinage debasement. To what extent Chauncy was partly responsible for this policy cannot be proven. Above all, he was probably an able administrator, but he was also one of the highest-ranking officials in the empire. Thus he had close contact with the king, who was also encouraged in this stance by his anti-Jewish wife Eleanor of Castile, by his mother Eleanor of Provence, and by his chancellor Robert Burnell. Chauncy himself acted as a moneylender to Christians on a small scale.

== Return to the Holy Land ==
Chauncy was also preoccupied in England, as was the king, with the question of how to help the hard-pressed Crusader states in the Holy Land. Around 1280, he resigned his offices as Treasurer and as Grand Prior of England and returned to Acre. There he acted as the vicar of Patriarch Elias Peleti. In letters he reported to Edward I on the situation on the ground. In 1281, he wrote a detailed account of the victory of the Mamluks over the Mongols in the Battle of Homs. Edward's response to Chauncy has also been recorded. Later, in 1283, Chauncy described in a letter to Edward I the difficult situation of the Christians in the Holy Land. The year of his death is unknown.

== Bibliography ==
- Bronstein, Judith (2005). The Hospitallers and the Holy Land: Financing the Latin East, 1187-1274. Boydell Press. ISBN 9781843831310.
- Delaville Le Roulx, Joseph (1904). Les Hospitaliers en Terre Sainte et à Chypre (1100-1310). E. Leroux, Paris.
- Demurger, Alain (2013). Les Hospitaliers, De Jérusalem à Rhodes 1050-1317. Tallandier, Paris. ISBN 979-1021000605.
- Flavigny, Bertrand Galimard (2006). Histoire de l'ordre de Malte. Perrin, Paris. ISBN 978-2262021153.
- Harot, Eugène (1911). Essai d'armorial des grands maîtres de l'Ordre de Saint-Jean de Jérusalem. Collegio araldico.
- Josserand, Philippe (2009). Prier et combattre, Dictionnaire européen des ordres militaires au Moyen Âge. Fayard, Paris. ISBN 978-2213627205.
- Lock, Peter (2006). The Routledge Companion to the Crusades. Routledge. doi:10.4324/9780203389638. ISBN 0-415-39312-4.
- Murray, Alan V. (2006). The Crusades—An Encyclopedia. ABC-CLIO. ISBN 978-1-57607-862-4.
- Nicholson, Helen J. (2001). The Knights Hospitaller. Boydell & Brewer. ISBN 9781843830382.
- Prestwich, Michael (1988). Edward I. University of California Press. ISBN 9780300071573.
- Richard, Jean (1985). "Agricultural Conditions in the Crusader States" (PDF). In Norman P. Zacour; Harry W. Hazard (eds.). A History of the Crusades, Volume V: The Impact of the Crusades on the Near East. University of Wisconsin Press. pp. 251–294.
- Rokéah, Zefira Entin (1995). "A Hospitaller and the Jews: Brother Joseph de Chauncy and English Jewry in the 1270s". Jewish Historical Studies. 34. Jewish Historical Studies, vol. 34, Jewish Historical Society of England, 1994, pp. 189–207: 189–207. JSTOR 29779959.
- Roth, Cecil (1964). History of the Jews in England. Clarendon Press. ISBN 9780198224884.
- Runciman, Steven (1954). A History of the Crusades, Volume Three: The Kingdom of Acre and the Later Crusades. Cambridge University Press. ISBN 9780521347723.
- Setton, Kenneth M. (1969). A History of the Crusades. University of Wisconsin Press.
- Tyerman, Christopher (2006). God's War: A New History of the Crusades. Belknap Press. ISBN 978-0-674-02387-1.
- Vann, Theresa M. (2006). Order of the Hospital. The Crusades––An Encyclopedia, pp. 598–605.
