= Charterius =

6th-century Roman Catholic bishop

Charterius (Chartier) was a 6th-century bishop of the Roman Catholic Diocese of Périgueux.

He is mentioned once in the History of the Franks by Gregory of Tours. Gregory wrote that Nunnichius, Count of Limoges had seized two men who were carrying letters purportedly written by Charterius criticizing and insulting King Chilperic I. Chilperic ordered for Charterius to appear before him. After meeting the king, Charterius accused his deacon of having written the letters in order to harm him. The deacon was then brought in to be questioned and the deacon confessed to having written the letters, but claimed that he had done so with the bishop's command. The bishop accused the deacon of lying. The king then decided to let them both go free.

In 585, he attended the second synod of Macon.
