= Diocese of Périgueux =

Catholic diocese in France

Coordinates: 45°11′19″N 0°43′39″E

Diocese of Périgueux and Sarlat Dioecesis Petrocoricensis et Sarlatensis Diocèse de Périgueux et Sarlat

Catholic
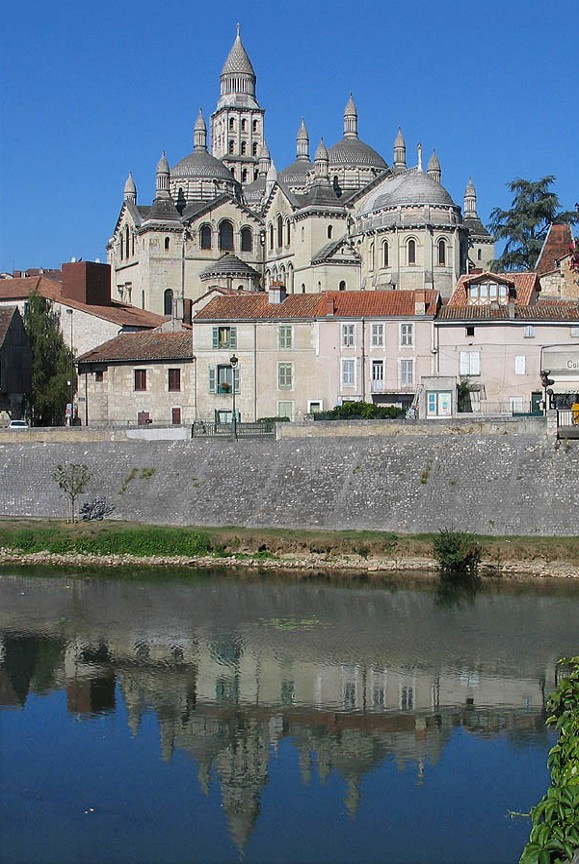
- Périgueux Cathedral

Location
- Country: France
- Ecclesiastical province: Bordeaux
- Metropolitan: Archdiocese of Bordeaux

Statistics
- Area: 9,060 km^{2} (3,500 sq mi)
- Population: Total; Catholics: (as of 2021); 419,600; 366,500 (87.3%)
- Parishes: 26

Information
- Denomination: Catholic Church
- Sui iuris church: Latin Church
- Rite: Roman Rite
- Established: 3rd Century
- Cathedral: Cathedral Basilica of St. Front in Périgueux
- Patron saint: Saint Front
- Secular priests: 52 (Diocesan); 12 (Religious Orders); 13 Permanent Deacons

Current leadership
- Pope: Leo XIV
- Bishop: Philippe Mousset
- Metropolitan Archbishop: Jean-Paul James
- Bishops emeritus: Michel Mouïsse

Map

Website
- www.diocese24.catholique.fr

The Diocese of Périgueux and Sarlat (Latin: Dioecesis Petrocoricensis et Sarlatensis; French: Diocèse de Périgueux et Sarlat) is a Latin Church ecclesiastical territory or diocese of the Catholic Church in France. Its episcopal see is Périgueux, in the département of Dordogne, in the région of Aquitaine. The Diocese of Périgueux is a suffragan diocese in the ecclesiastical province of the metropolitan Archdiocese of Bordeaux. The current bishop is Philippe Mousset, who was appointed in 2014.

== History ==
The Martyrology of Ado gives St. Front as the first bishop of Périgueux; Saint Peter is said to have sent him to this town with the St. George to whom later traditions assign the foundation of the church of Le Puy. Subsequent biographies, which appeared between the 10th and 13th centuries, make St. Front's life one with that of St. Fronto of Nitria, thereby giving it an Egyptian colouring. At all events we know by the Chronicle of Sulpicius Severus that a Bishop of Périgueux, Paternus, was deposed for heresy about 361.

Among its bishops are:

- Raymond V, Cardinal of Pons (1220–1223)
- the future cardinal, Hélie de Bourdeilles (1447–1468)
- Claude de Longwy, Cardinal of Givry, who was only the administrator, not the bishop, from 27 August 1540 to 27 August 1541.
- the future Cardinal Gousset (1836–1840), subsequently Archbishop of Reims.

The Abbey of Saint-Sauveur of Sarlat, later placed under the patronage of St. Sacerdos of Limoges, seems to have existed before the reigns of Pepin the Short and Charlemagne who came there in pilgrimage and because of their munificence deserved to be called "founders" in a Bull of Pope Eugene III (1153). About 936 St. Odo, Abbot of Cluny, was sent to reform the abbey. The abbey was made an episcopal see by pope John XXII, on 13 January 1318.

== Bishops ==
=== to 1000 ===
- Saint Front
- Agnan
- Chronope I
- c. 356: Paterne
- c. 380: Gavide
- c. 410: Pégase
- c. 506 – c. 533: Chronope II
- c. 540: Sabaude
- c. 582: Chartier
- c. 590: Saffaire
- c. 629: Austier
- c. 767 – c. 778: Bertrand
- c. 805 – c. 811: Raimond I
- c. 844: Ainard
- c. 900: Sébaude
- 977–991: Frotaire
- 992–1000: Martin

=== 1000–1200 ===
- 1000–1009: Rodolphe de Coué
- 1010–1036 or 1037: Arnaud de Vitabre
- c. 1037–1059: Géraud de Gourdon
- 1060–1081: Guillaume I de Montberon
- 1081–1099: Renaud de Tivier
- 1100–1101: Raimond II
- 1102–1129: Guillaume II d'Auberoche
- 1130–1138: Guillaume III de Nanclars
- 1138–1142: Geoffroi I de Cauze
- 1142–1147: Pierre I
- 1148–1158: Raimond III de Mareuil
- 1160–1169: Jean I d'Assida
- 1169–1182: Pierre II Minet
- 1185–1197: Adhémar I de La Torre
- 1197–1210: Raimond IV de Châteauneuf

=== 1200–1400 ===
- 1210–1220: Raoul I de Lastours de Laron
- 1220–1233: Cardinal Raimond de Pons
- 1234–1266: Pierre III de Saint-Astier
- 1267 – c. 1280: Elie I Pilet
- c. 1282 – c. 1295: Raimond VI d'Auberoche
- 1297 – c. 1312: Audouin
- 1314–1331: Raimond VII
- 1332–1333: Giraud
- 1333–1335: Pierre IV
- 1336–1340: Raimond VIII
- 1340 – c. 1346: Guillaume IV Audibert
- 1347–1348: Adhémar II
- 1349 – c. 1382: Pierre V Pin
- 1384–1385: Elie II Servient
- 1387 – c. 1400: Pierre VI de Durfort

=== 1400–1600 ===
- c. 1402: Guillaume V Lefèvre
- c. 1405: Gabriel I
- 1407–1408: Raimond IX de Castelnau
- 1408 – c. 1430: Jean II
- 1431 – c. 1436: Berenger
- 1437–1438: Elie III
- 1438–1439: Pierre VII de Durfort
- 1440–1441: Raimond X
- 1441 – c. 1446: Geoffroi II Bérenger d'Arpajon
- 1447–1463: Elie IV de Bourdeille
- 1463–1470: Raoul II du Fou (also Bishop of Angoulême)
- 1470–1485: Geoffroi III de Pompadour (also Bishop of Angoulême)
- 1486–1500: Gabriel II du Mas
- 1500–1504: Geoffroi III de Pompadour
- 1504 – c. 1510: Jean III Auriens
- 1510–1522: Gui I de Castelnau
- 1522–1524: Jacques de Castelnau
- 1524–1532: Jean de Plas
- 1532–1540: Foucaud de Bonneval
- 1540–1541: Claude de Longwy, Cardinal de Givry
- 1541–1547 Agostino Trivulzio, administrator
- 1548–1550: Jean de Lustrac
- 1551–1552: Geoffroi de Pompadour
- 1554–1560: Gui II Bouchard d'Aubeterre
- 1561–1575: Pierre VIII Fournier
- 1578–1600: François I de Bourdeille

=== 1600–1800 ===
- 1600–1612: Jean VI Martin
- 1614–1646: François II de La Béraudière
- 1646: Jean VII d'Estrades
- 1646–1652: Philibert de Brandon
- 1654–1665: Cyr de Villers-la-Faye
- 1666–1693: Guillaume VI Le Boux
- 1693–1702: Daniel de Francheville
- 1702–1719: Pierre IX Clément
- 1721–1731: Michel-Pierre d'Argouges
- 1731–1771: Jean VIII Chrétien de Macheco de Prémeaux
- 1771–1773: Gabriel III Louis de Rougé
- 1773–1790: Emmanuel-Louis de Grossoles de Flamarens
- 1791–1793: Pontaud

=== from 1800 ===
- 1817–1836: Alexandre-Charles-Louis-Rose de Lostanges-Saint-Alvère
- 1835–1840: Thomas-Marie-Joseph Gousset (also Archbishop of Reims)
- 1840–1860: Jean-Baptiste-Amédée Georges-Massonnais
- 1861–1863: Charles-Théodore Baudry
- 1863–1901: Nicolas-Joseph Dabert
- 1901–1906: François-Marie-Joseph Delamaire
- 1906–1915: Henri-Louis-Prosper Bougoin
- 1915–1920: Maurice-Louis-Marie Rivière
- 1920–1931: Christophe-Louis Légasse
- 1932–1965: Georges-Auguste Louis
- 1965–1988: Jacques-Julien-Émile Patria
- 1988–2004: Gaston Élie Poulain, P.S.S.
- 2004–2014: Michel Pierre Marie Mouïsse
- 2014–present: Philippe Mousset

== Bibliography ==
=== Reference books ===
- Eubel, Conradus, ed. (1913). Hierarchia catholica, Tomus 1 (second ed.). Münster: Libreria Regensbergiana. p. 397-398. (in Latin)
- Eubel, Conradus, ed. (1914). Hierarchia catholica, Tomus 2 (second ed.). Münster: Libreria Regensbergiana. pp. 215.
- Eubel, Conradus, ed. (1923). Hierarchia catholica, Tomus 3 (second ed.). Münster: Libreria Regensbergiana. p. 272.
- Gauchat, Patritius (Patrice) (1935). Hierarchia catholica IV (1592–1667). Münster: Libraria Regensbergiana. p. 277.
- Ritzler, Remigius; Sefrin, Pirminus (1952). Hierarchia catholica medii et recentis aevi V (1667–1730). Patavii: Messagero di S. Antonio. pp. 311–312.
- Ritzler, Remigius; Sefrin, Pirminus (1958). Hierarchia catholica medii et recentis aevi VI (1730–1799). Patavii: Messagero di S. Antonio. p. 334.
- Sainte-Marthe, Denis de (1720). Gallia Christiana: In Provincias Ecclesiasticas Distributa... Provinciae Burdigalensis, Bituricensis (in Latin). Vol. Tomus secundus. Paris: Typographia Regia. pp. 1446–1507.

=== Studies ===
- Carles, abbé (1871). Monographie de Saint-Front, cathédrale de Périgueux (in French). Périgueux: Cassard impr.

=== External links ===
- (in French) Centre national des Archives de l'Église de France, L’Épiscopat francais depuis 1919, retrieved: 2016-12-24.
