= Coronations of the kings and queens of Jerusalem =

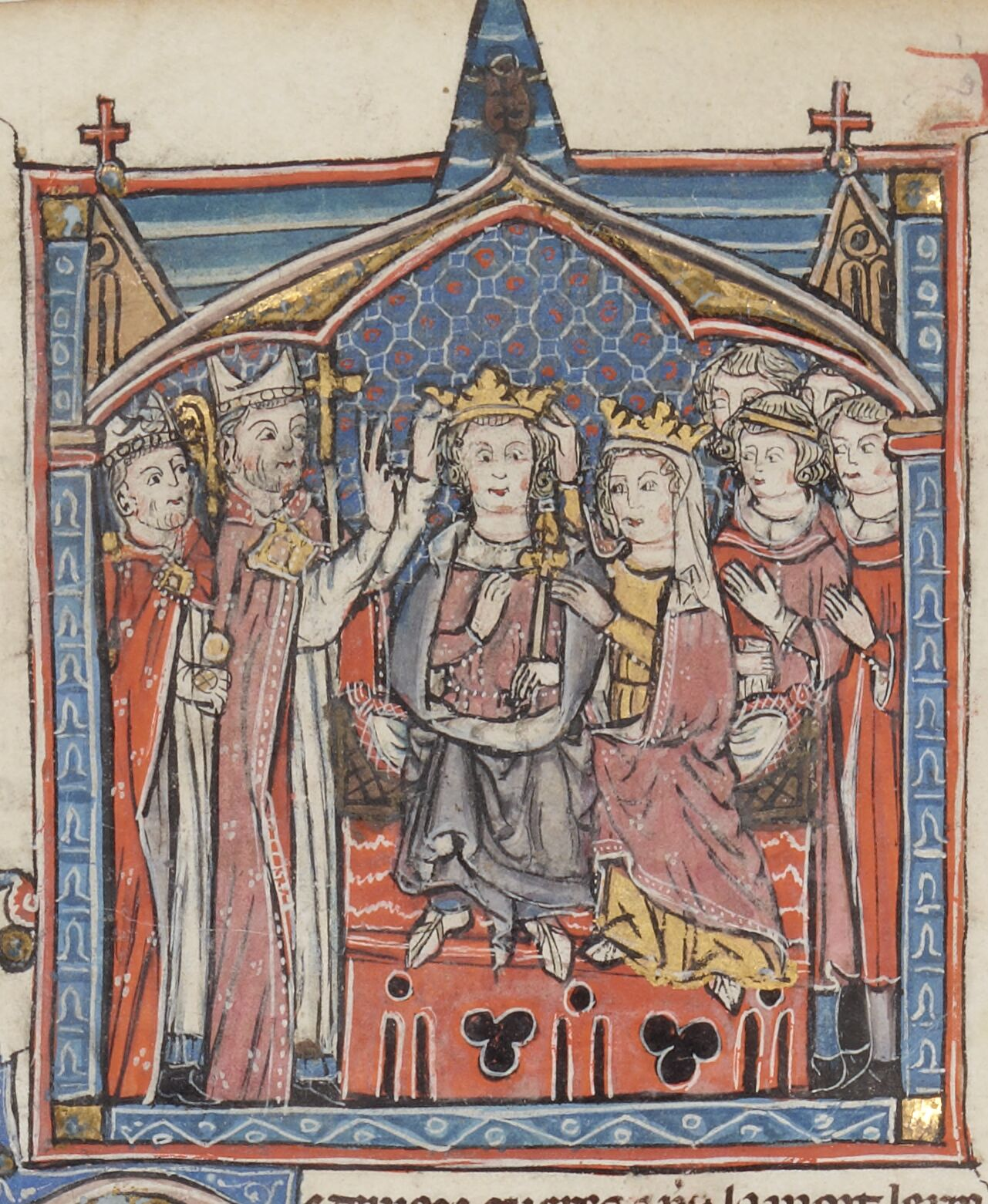
A king or queen could be crowned multiple times: Melisende was crowned again at her son Baldwin III's first coronation.

The kings and queens of the crusader Kingdom of Jerusalem (1100–1291) were invested with royal powers in coronation ceremonies. The first coronation of a king or queen normally encompassed consecration and anointing, which were constitutionally more important than the act of crowning.

Coronations were usually held on feast days or Sundays. The prerogative to perform the rite belonged to the Latin patriarch of Jerusalem; another prelate could perform it if the patriarchate was vacant or the patriarch was unavailable. The coronation site shifted in 1131 from the Church of the Nativity in Bethlehem to the Church of the Holy Sepulchre in Jerusalem and, after the loss of Jerusalem in 1187, was relocated in the thirteenth century to the Cathedral of the Holy Cross in Tyre.

At least two crowns existed in the twelfth century: one for the king and one for the queen. Other regalia included the orb and the sceptre. The royal insignia were kept in a treasure vault that had to be unlocked by at least two keys, belonging to the masters of the Knights Templar and Knights Hospitaller; a third key may have belonged to the patriarch. The Pontifical of Tyre preserves the order of service for the thirteenth-century coronations, showing the various roles played by the royal officers. After the coronation, the king offered his crown to the Temple of the Lord, then redeemed it for a lower price, and proceeded to a banquet at the Temple of Solomon; in the thirteenth century the coronation was followed by a banquet at the royal palace in Tyre. The last territories of the Kingdom of Jerusalem were lost in 1291, after which three kings and two queens of Cyprus were crowned on Cyprus as kings and queens of Jerusalem.

== Twelfth century ==
=== Place ===
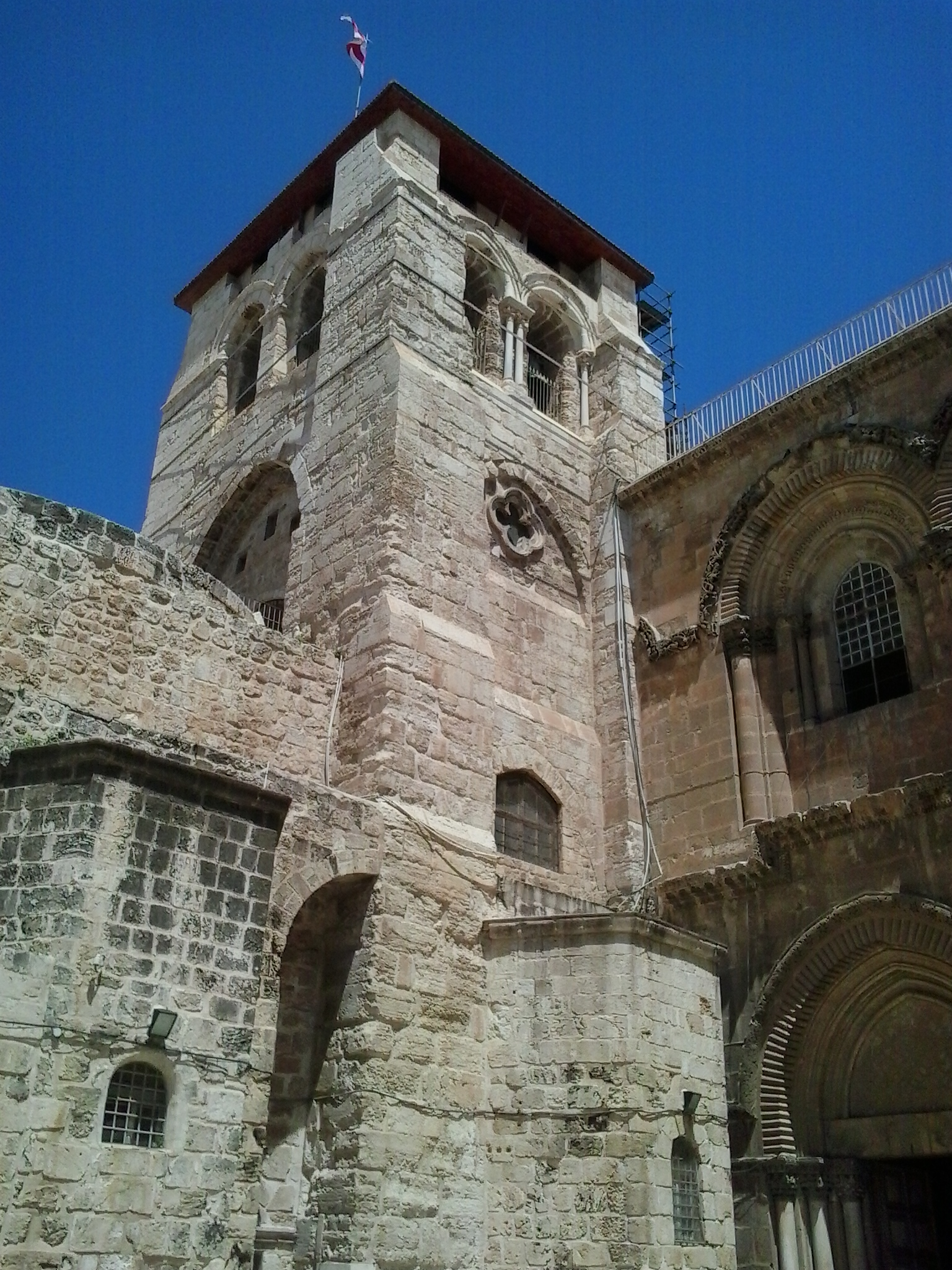
The Holy Sepulchre (12th-century bell tower pictured) was the coronation church from 1131 until 1187.

The first ruler of the Kingdom of Jerusalem, Godfrey of Bouillon (r. 1099–1100), did not take the royal title, but his successor, Baldwin I (r. 1100–1118), did. Baldwin was involved in a dispute with the Latin patriarch of Jerusalem, Daimbert of Pisa, over the possession of the city of Jerusalem. While Baldwin took the city for himself, he was crowned at the Church of the Nativity in Bethlehem; the historian Hans E. Mayer presumes that Baldwin did not wish to further irritate Daimbert by being crowned in Jerusalem. This was also a solution to the complaint of the clergy that it was inappropriate for anyone to wear a crown of gold in the city where, according to the Bible, Jesus wore a crown of thorns.

Baldwin II (r. 1118–1131) and his wife, Morphia, were likewise crowned in the Bethlehem church. This practice came to end with Fulk (r. 1131–1143) and Melisende (r. 1131–1152), who were crowned in the Church of the Holy Sepulchre, the kingdom's main church. The Holy Sepulchre remained the coronation church until the loss of Jerusalem in 1187. Kings Baldwin III (r. 1143–1163), Amalric (r. 1163–1174), Baldwin IV (r. 1174–1185), and Baldwin V (r. 1183–1186) were all crowned there. Theodora Komnene was crowned in Jerusalem, presumably also at the Holy Sepulchre. Exceptionally, Maria Komnene was crowned in Tyre immediately upon landing in the kingdom; her husband, Amalric, presumably wished to hasten the ceremony because he feared that his recent admission of the disgraced Andronikos Komnenos would offend Maria's granduncle and Amalric's new ally Emperor Manuel I Komnenos.

=== Date ===
In the Middle Ages, coronations were normally performed on Sundays. These were also often feast days. Baldwin I was crowned on Christmas. Baldwin II was consecrated and anointed on Easter Sunday 1118, but was only crowned on Christmas 1119. He may have delayed the coronation so that his wife, Morphia of Melitene, could come from Edessa and be crowned alongside him. Fulk and Melisende were crowned on 14 September 1131, the Feast of the Cross. Baldwin III was crowned on Christmas 1143; his second coronation, planned for Easter 1152, probably never took place. Amalric was crowned on 18 February 1163, the feast of Saint Simeon of Jerusalem. The coronation of Amalric's wife Maria on 29 August 1167 fell on the feast of the Beheading of Saint John the Baptist; because John the Baptist was beheaded at the request of Herodias, the historian Hans E. Mayer concludes that this feast day was not appropriate for the coronation of a queen and that the ceremony must have been rushed. The date of Baldwin IV's coronation, 15 July 1174, was the 75th anniversary of the capture of Jerusalem by the First Crusade. Baldwin V's coronation on 20 November 1183 was held on a Sunday, which–coincidentally or not–fell on the feast of Saint Edmund the Martyr, who appears in the Melisende Psalter's calendar of saints. The coronation of Sibylla and Guy in 1186 took place on a Friday, which displeased the contemporary chronicler; on Fridays, only Lenten food could be served at the coronation banquet.

=== Officiant ===
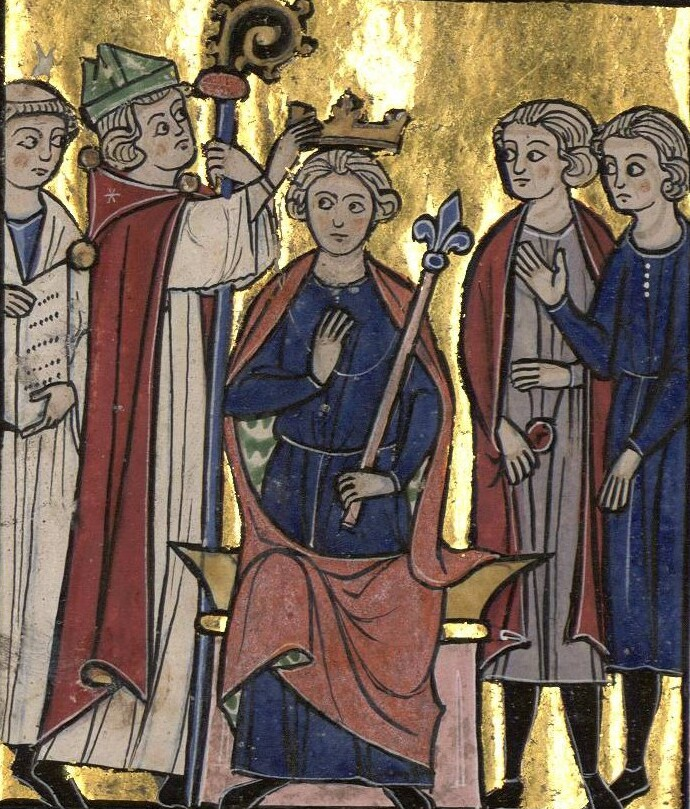
Patriarch William crowns King Fulk

The right to crown kings and queens of Jerusalem belonged to the Latin patriarchs of Jerusalem. Ekkehard of Aura records that Baldwin I was crowned by the papal legate, Bishop Maurice of Porto, but Mayer concludes that this refers to a festive coronation at Easter 1101. The details of Baldwin II's coronation are sketchy, but he too was presumably crowned by the patriarch, then Warmund of Picquigny.

When the patriarch's right to office was challenged, the king had the right to request the coronation from another prelate. In this way, the king would prevent doubts about his own legitimacy. Queen Theodora was thus crowned and anointed in 1158 by Aimery of Limoges, the exiled Latin patriarch of Antioch, because the Latin patriarch of Jerusalem, Amalric of Nesle, had not yet been consecrated. At the highly irregular coronation of Sibylla and Guy in 1186, it was Patriarch Heraclius who crowned the queen and invited her to choose a king; she then crowned her husband with the crown handed to her by the patriarch.

The coronator had the right to refuse to officiate and to impose conditions if canon law was concerned. Patriarch Amalric thus refused to crown King Amalric until the latter agreed to separate from his first wife, Agnes of Courtenay, to whom he was too closely related.

=== Consort ===
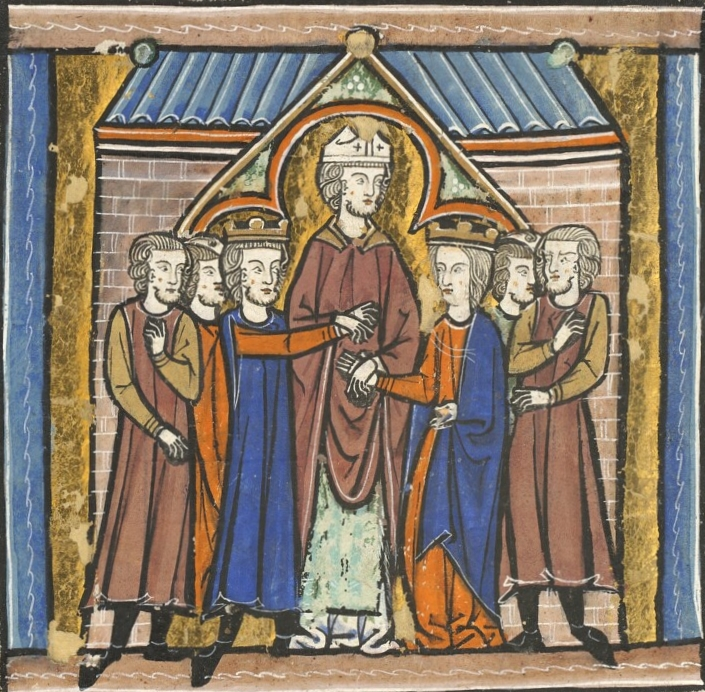
Maria Komnene was crowned queen before she married King Amalric.

The wives of Baldwin I, Arda of Armenia and Adelaide of Sicily, were apparently not crowned; Baldwin I had married Adelaide while Arda was still alive, and the marriage was condemned as bigamous. The first recorded coronation of a queen consort of Jerusalem is that of Morphia of Melitene, who was crowned alongside her husband, Baldwin II, on Christmas 1119. In contrast to the Western practice, Theodora and Maria Komnene were crowned before their weddings. This may have been demanded in their native Byzantine Empire during marriage negotiations.

=== Customs ===
Coronation customs of the twelfth-century Kingdom of Jerusalem are not well-preserved, but the chronicler William of Tyre says that they existed when he mentions the coronations of Theodora and Maria Komnene. The coronation was normally associated with consecration and anointment. Anointment was not yet widespread in Christendom, but it was already employed in the kingdoms of France, England, and Germany; the first of these had a considerable influence on the Kingdom of Jerusalem. Upon consecration, the ruler took an oath. The chartulary of the Holy Sepulchre contains the only such oath from the twelfth century, that of a King Baldwin. In this oath the king declares that he wishes to enforce the law and provide the Church and people of Jerusalem with justice and peace, to honor the patriarch and the princes of the Church, and to confirm the Church in its possessions granted by emperors, kings, and princes.

The acclamation of the ruler by the people was an important part of the ruler's investiture. The coronation was to be open to the nobility, clergy, and people; William's continuator complained that the city of Jerusalem was closed on the occasion of the coronation of Sibylla and Guy, who were opposed by a large section of the nobility. Liturgical enthronement is only explicitly mentioned in the account of Amalric's coronation.

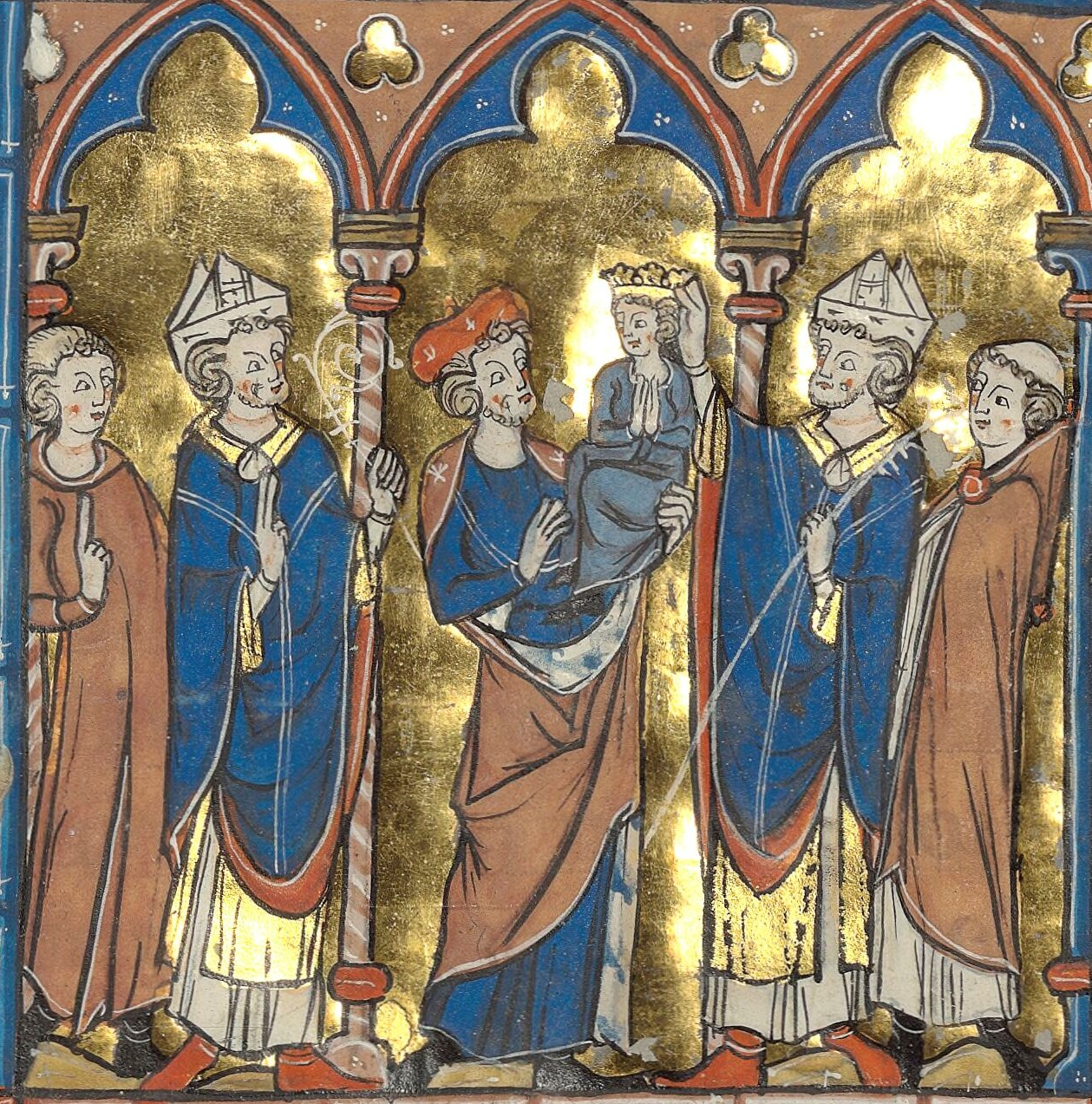
The boy king Baldwin V was carried to the banquet after his coronation.

According to William's continuators, it was customary for the newly crowned king to go in a procession to the Temple of the Lord and offer his crown to the canons; he would then redeem the crown for a monetary gift. The continuator notes that the people of Jerusalem, following Leviticus 12:1–8 and Luke 2:22–24, offered their eldest sons to the Temple after birth and then redeemed them with a lamb, two pigeons, or two turtledoves. After this offering, the king went in a procession to the Temple of Solomon, which was once the seat of the curia regis and then the headquarters of the Order of the Temple. A banquet was held there for the king and the barons. The privilege and duty to serve the table belonged to the Frankish commoners.

In the Kingdom of Jerusalem, coronation did not make a king. It was the election by the barons, confirmed by the popular acclamation, and the anointment that gave the king the right to rule. The coronation, however, invested the king with dignity required to remain on the throne and thus could not be entirely dispensed with. A ruler could be anointed only once, but could be crowned multiple times. Baldwin III was crowned together with his mother, Melisende, but only he was anointed and consecrated on that occasion because Melisende had already been anointed and consecrated when she was crowned with her husband, Fulk. Amalric underwent a similar co-coronation on the occasion of the coronation of his second wife, Maria Komnene, in 1167.

Festive coronations may have taken place in the Kingdom of Jerusalem too. This ritual was merely celebratory, without any constitutional significance. The chronicler Albert of Aachen reports that Baldwin I had three festive coronations in Bethlehem: at Epiphany 1107, at Easter 1107, and at Easter 1112. Baldwin's court chaplain, the chronicler Fulcher of Chartres, does not mention any of these, and it is possible that Albert mistook other celebrations for the ritual familiar to him in Germany. Yet the festive coronation was known in the Kingdom of Jerusalem. When Baldwin III–who had been crowned alongside his mother, Melisende, and reigned with her–intended to undergo a solo confirmatory coronation in 1152, the patriarch, Fulcher of Angoulême, wished to avoid a rupture with Melisende and proposed to instead hold a festive coronation for both king and queen.

=== Regalia ===
At least two royal crowns existed in the Kingdom of Jerusalem: one for the king and one for the queen. The king donated his crown to the Temple of the Lord after coronation, but this was not meant to be permanent and the king could not afford to commission new crowns for each coronation; instead, the crown was redeemed for a lower price. That the crowns were passed from one ruler to another may be inferred from William of Tyre's comment that King Amalric was crowned in 1167 with the "ancestral diadem".

The crown was made of gold and is occasionally referred to as a diadem in the chronicles of Fulcher of Chartres and William of Tyre. The royal lead seals consistently depict a rigid crown band open at the top, in a Western design, with several attached upright points. What made it resemble a diadem–at least in the sense of the Byzantine kamelaukion, sometimes called a diadem– were the two pendilia attached to its sides, as seen in the seals.

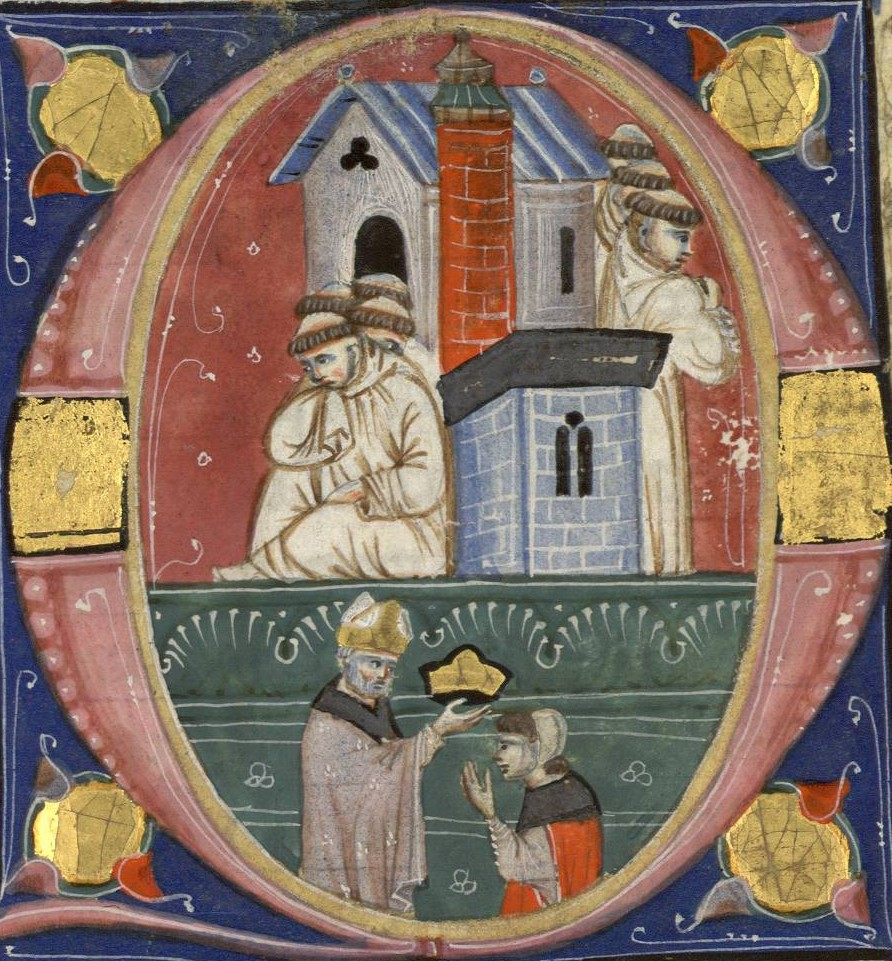
Sibylla's coronation was so controversial that the key to the vault containing the crown was obtained only with great difficulty.

The two crowns, probably along with other regalia, were kept locked in a treasure vault. At least two keys were needed to unlock the vault: one belonged to the master of the Order of the Temple and the other to the master of the Order of the Hospital. A third key may have belonged to the patriarch. This is recorded in the account of Sibylla and Guy's coronation in 1186. The keepers of the keys could influence the succession by withholding access to the crowns: the master of the Hospital, Roger of Moulins, initially refused to surrender his keys to the vault in protest over Sibylla's accession and only threw them in anger at the patriarch's insistence. That the master had to be persuaded suggests that it was important that the right crown be used; otherwise an alternative could have been found. The crown was likely lost during Saladin's 1187 conquest of Jerusalem.

From the reign of Amalric (r. 1163–1174) to the reign of Aimery (r. 1197–1205), the kings were depicted on their seals wearing a sash, which may have formed a part of their coronation attire. This sash has been interpreted either as the Byzantine loros or as a loros-inspired clerical stole. The sash was dropped in the thirteenth century. The kings also possessed a royal cloak and a sceptre. Another sign of Byzantine influence is the orb, which is depicted on the royal seals. A royal banner also appears in these depictions, and is known from the thirteenth-century order of coronation of service.

== Thirteenth century ==
=== Changing circumstances ===
Far fewer coronations were held in the Kingdom of Jerusalem in the thirteenth century than in the twelfth because many kings lived abroad. The first three husbands of Isabella I (r. 1190–1205) were not crowned: Humphrey IV of Toron was separated from her before she could be recognized as successor; Conrad of Montferrat was assassinated before his planned coronation at Tyre could take place; and Henry II of Champagne died without ever having planned a coronation. Conrad and Henry may have been prevented by a lack of patriarch, and as long as they were not crowned, neither was Isabella. She was finally crowned alongside her fourth husband, Aimery of Cyprus, in Acre in January 1198 by the patriarch, Aymar the Monk. Conrad used the title "king-elect", while Henry never adopted the royal title and Isabella only started using the title "queen" after her coronation.

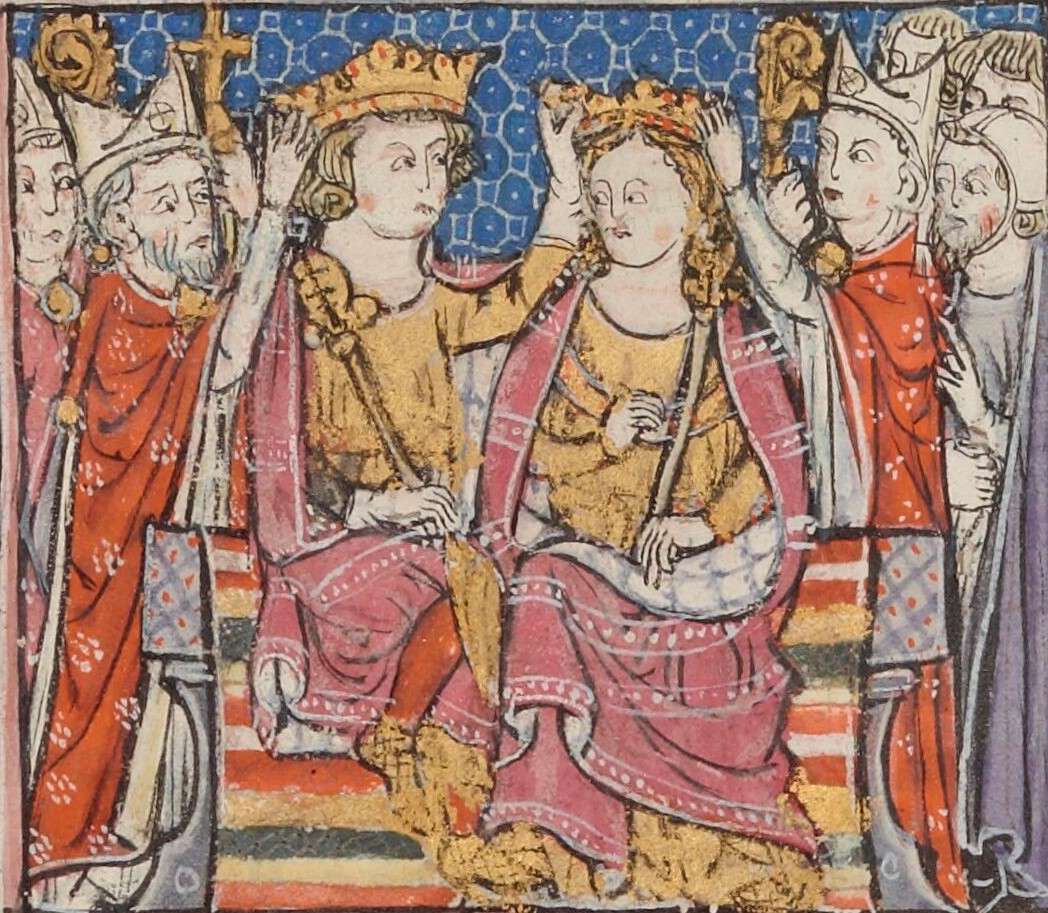
Maria of Montferrat inherited the crown in 1205, but was only crowned in 1210 after marrying John of Brienne, who was crowned alongside her.

Isabella I's heir was her daughter Maria of Montferrat (r. 1205–1212), but there was an interregnum until the marriage of Maria and John of Brienne in September 1210 and their coronation by the patriarch, Albert of Vercelli, at the Cathedral of the Holy Cross in Tyre on 3 October. The coronation was attended by the archbishops of Tyre, Caesarea, and Nazareth, the bishops of Acre and Sidon, the masters of the Templars, Hospitallers, and Teutonic Knights, the lords of Ibelin, Sidon, Tiberias, Montfort, Caesarea, Blanchegarde, Haifa, and other high nobles.

Tyre was chosen for the coronation of Maria of Montferrat and John of Brienne probably because of the precedent set by Maria Komnene's coronation in 1167, the planned coronation of Conrad of Montferrat, and the site's second place in the Church hierarchy. The choice became enshrined in the kingdom's feudal law. In his 1265 Assizes, the jurist John of Ibelin prescribes that the king should be crowned in Jerusalem if possible, otherwise in Tyre; and that the coronation should be performed by the patriarch if possible, otherwise by the archbishop of Tyre, or, failing him, by the archbishop of Caesarea, and lastly by the archbishop of Nazareth.

=== Order of service ===
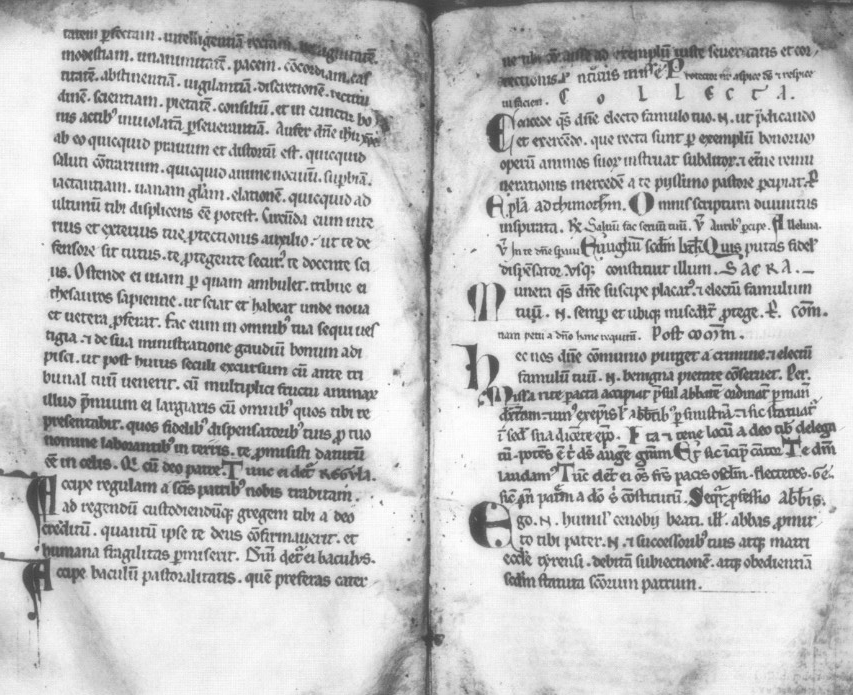
The Pontifical of Tyre preserves the information about the order of the coronation service.

The ordo (order of service) for the thirteenth-century coronations is found in the Pontifical of Tyre, while John of Ibelin supplies the rest of the information. The ceremony began in the morning, when the king-to-be put on the royal garments in the palace. This initial rite was conducted under the supervision of the chamberlain. Outside the vestiarium, the highest-ranking royal officers assembled and accompany the king-to-be in a formal procession to the coronation church. The chamberlain led, carrying a sword, followed in sequence by the seneschal with the scepter, the constable with the banner, and finally the king-to-be on horseback, led by the marshal.

At the threshold of the church, the patriarch awaited the procession. He received the king-to-be with a prayer said over him as he knelt and then administered an oath upon the Gospels. This oath, originally associated with King Aimery, was extended in John of Ibelin's version to include promises to defend widows and orphans and to uphold the traditional laws and privileges of earlier kings. Once the oath had been sworn, the patriarch pledged to help the king preserve his crown, sealing the promise with a kiss. The ritual then turned to the gathered people, who were asked three times whether they acknowledged the candidate as their rightful king. After each acclaim, the procession entered the choir to the sound of the Te Deum. As the hymn continued, the king-to-be was ceremonially arrayed in deacon's vestments—though he was not ordained—and took his place in a faldistorium before the altar. There the patriarch recited the Invocatio super regem. The candidate then rose and proceeded to the throne, from which he observed the rest of the liturgy.

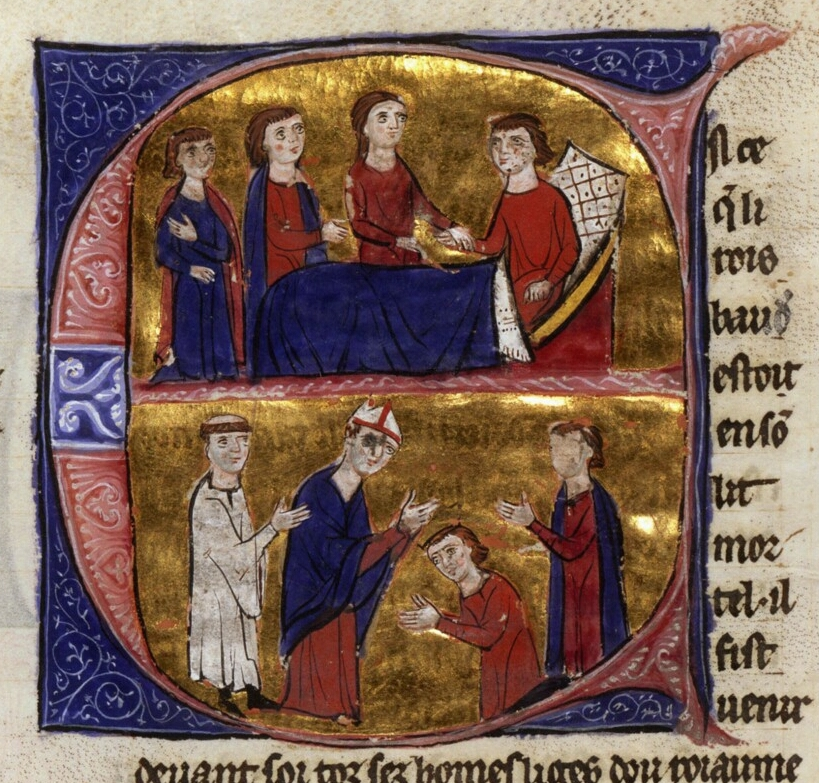
Though miniatures often show Jerusalem's monarchs crowned kneeling, the surviving order of service indicates otherwise.

When the Mass reached the epistle and sequence, two prelates led the king-to-be back to the faldistorium. The patriarch then recited the Consecratio regis and anointed his head with chrism, marking his entry into a semi-sacred royal state. Although medieval miniatures often depict the kings and queens of Jerusalem being crowned while kneeling, the surviving order of service indicates that they only knelt before an ecclesiastic during consecration. During the accompanying prayers, the regalia were bestowed. The ring came first, symbolizing royal dignity. The sword followed, girded as a sign of his duty to defend the Church and the faith. With the chamberlain now relieved of his sword, he assumed the role of presenting the remaining insignia to the patriarch, who in turn handed them to the king. The crown was placed upon his head, then the scepter was given, and finally the orb, representing the realm itself. The prayers used in this part of the ceremony were drawn from the Pontifical of Tyre, indicating the continuity of liturgical tradition.

After a series of blessings, the newly anointed king was reminded of his responsibilities: to preserve peace for both Church and people, to suppress theft and injustice across all social ranks, and to uphold justice and mercy in all matters. He then kissed each of the prelates, and the church rang out three times with the Latin acclamation "Vivat rex feliciter in sempiternum", a renewed expression of popular assent. The Coronation Mass resumed, with the king seated on the throne. As part of his ceremonial role, he offered the patriarch gifts—likely bread and candles—along with wine following the Gospel. During the Eucharist, he removed his crown and, once the Mass had ended, returned to the altar to receive Communion. The rite concluded with the patriarch taking the banner from the constable, pronouncing a blessing, and handing it to the king, who then gave it back to the constable.

The coronation of the king is followed by the solemn coronation of the queen, who first receives the anointing, ring, and crown. The queen then also received the scepter, an emphasis unique to the Pontifical of Tyre; this may have reflected the fact that in the early thirteenth century the throne of Jerusalem was inherited exclusively by women.

Aside from the first coronation of the king and queen, festive coronations were also held in the thirteenth century. On these occasions, the seneschal and the chamberlain had the same duties.

=== Banquet ===
After the ceremony, if held in Jerusalem, the king proceeded to the Temple of the Lord for the offering and repurchase of the crown. As the king left the coronation church, the marshal took the banner from the constable and, in return, presented him with the king's horse. Acting as strator, the constable led the king through the crowd, while the marshal, bearing the banner, rode ahead on the constable's horse.

From the Temple, the procession moved to the Temple of Solomon for the coronation banquet—or directly to the royal palace in Tyre if the coronation took place there. The seneschal, who had departed as soon as the ceremony ended, oversaw the banquet's preparation unless the king gave contrary instructions. He was tasked with appointing the servers, chosen from among the non-noble Frankish citizens of Jerusalem, for whom this duty was both a right and an obligation. The chamberlain washed the king's hands before and after the meal and filled his cup during it—the cup becoming his remuneration. During the meal, the marshal held the banner, and the seneschal carried the scepter, which he could, due to his broader responsibilities, delegate to another. At the meal's conclusion, the seneschal gave the signal to clear the table, then escorted the king—still bearing the scepter—back to his chambers, accompanied by the constable and the banner-bearing marshal.

Once the king was returned, the constable received his horse as payment and was escorted by the marshal to his own residence, where he gave his horse to the marshal. Though the constable ended with no horse, he likely profited from the more valuable equipment of the royal steed. The seneschal returned to the banquet hall—not only to dine, but because his compensation consisted of the leftover meat and the tableware.

=== Alleged self-coronation ===
Isabella II (r. 1212–1228) was crowned in Acre in August 1225. The Estoire d'Eracles reports that she was crowned by the patriarch, Ralph of Mérencourt, but Ralph had probably died in 1124 and his successor, Gerold of Lausanne, had not yet arrived in the kingdom. Meyer therefore concludes that Isabella was crowned by the archbishop of Tyre, Simon of Maugastel. She was soon after married to Emperor Frederick II, who was not crowned alongside her.

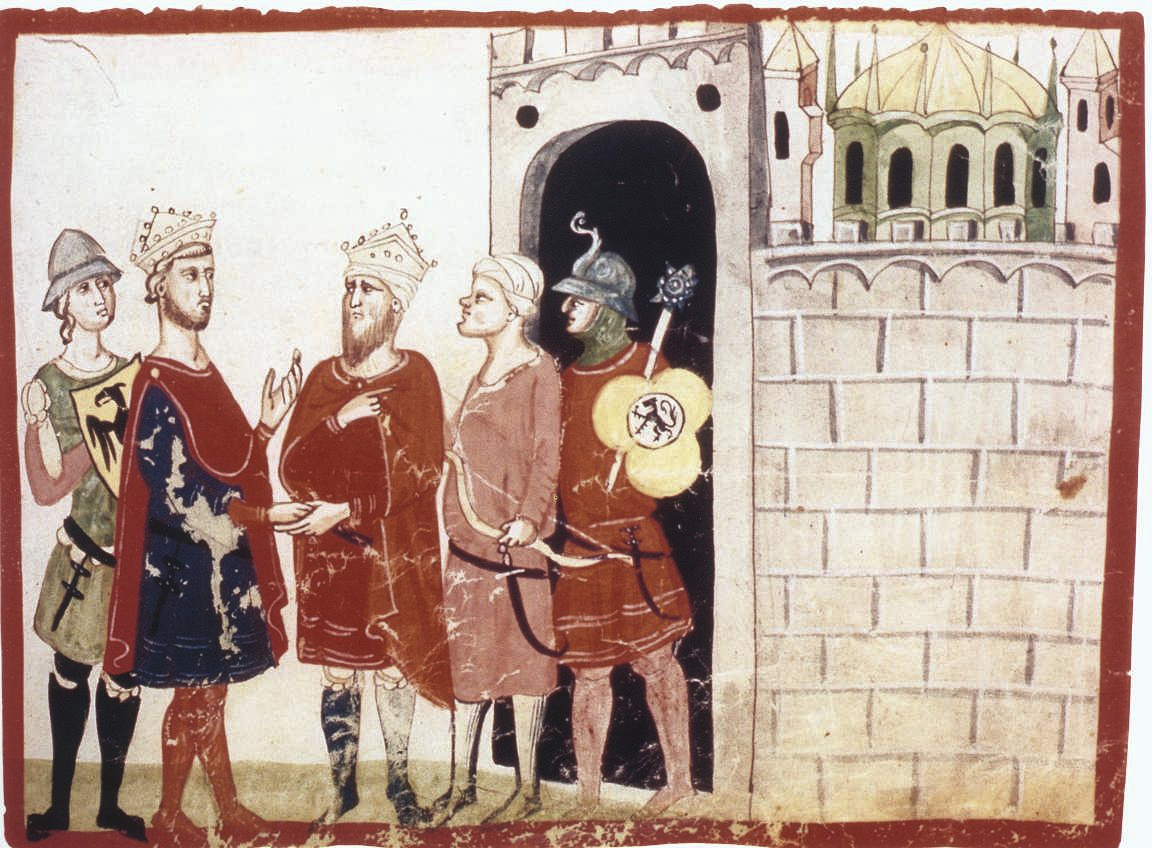
Frederick briefly restored Jerusalem to the kingdom, but the allegations that he performed a self-coronation shocked the patriarch and the pope.

After Isabella II's death in 1228, Frederick retained authority only as the guardian of their son, Conrad II (r. 1228–1254). By the Treaty of Jaffa in February 1229, Frederick briefly restored the city of Jerusalem to the kingdom. On 18 March, Frederick appeared in the Church of the Holy Sepulchre in Jerusalem wearing a crown. No clergy officiated, no Mass was held, and no anointing took place. According to Hermann of Salza, Frederick took the crown from the altar and carried it to the throne, following customary practice. The archbishop of Caesarea, Peter of Limoges, sent by Patriarch Gerold to prevent the act, arrived after it had occurred. An interdict had been placed on the city in advance of the event.

Reports of the event used the expression "portare coronam" ("to bear the crown"). Patriarch Gerold and Pope Gregory IX referred to it as a self-coronation. In a June 1229 letter, the pope described the act as Frederick placing a crown on his own head in the Church of the Holy Sepulchre while under excommunication. This accusation did not appear in later papal correspondence. No record of a formal coronation exists, and no ecclesiastical ceremony was conducted.

=== Last coronations ===
Conrad (r. 1228–1254) and Conradin (r. 1254–1268) lived in Europe and never came to be crowned. After Conradin's death, the kingdom passed to Hugh I (r. 1268–1284), who was already king of Cyprus. Hugh's coronation was chaotic. It was held in Tyre on 24 September 1269, a Tuesday on which no feast day fell. John of Troyes, the bishop of Lydda, performed it at the behest of the patriarch; the archbishoprics of Tyre, Nazareth, and Caesarea were all vacant. Hugh's successor, John (r. 1284–1285), reigned shortly and was apparently not crowned.

Henry II (r. 1285–1291) was crowned at Tyre by Archbishop Bonacursus de Gloire on 15 August 1286, the feast of the Assumption of Mary. After the coronation banquet in Tyre, Henry went to Acre, where two weeks of celebrations took place in the town hall of the Knights Hospitaller, including jousting and performances of the stories of King Arthur's Round Table, Lancelot, and Tristan. Meyer calls this the "last time courtly splendor unfolded in the crusader states".

In 1291, the last remnants of the kingdom fell to Mamluk Egypt. The right of the Lusignan kings to the crown of Jerusalem was disputed by the Angevin kings of Naples, and the Cypriot kings thus decided to undergo two coronations: one at the Cathedral of Saint Sophia in Nicosia, as kings of Cyprus, and another at the Cathedral of Saint Nicholas in Famagusta, as kings of Jerusalem. In this way they publicized their claims to the defunct kingdom. The queens consort of Cyprus were crowned at Famagusta with their husbands. Famagusta was the Cypriot town closest to the former territories of the Kingdom of Jerusalem, and the Cathedral of Saint Nicholas may have been built to serve as the coronation church. Three kings and two queens were crowned at Famagusta: Hugh II (r. 1324–1359) and Alice of Ibelin on 13 May 1324; Peter I (r. 1359–1369) and Eleanor of Aragon on 5 April 1360 (Easter Sunday) by the apostolic legate, Peter Thomas, with eight days of great festivities in the town; and Peter II, who was unmarried at the time, on 10 October 1372 (r. 1369–1382).

At the coronations in Famagusta, the kings appointed favored nobles to the offices of the Kingdom of Jerusalem; the offices were prestigious, but their sole function was to assist at the coronations. At Famagusta, it became customary that, once the king mounted his horse to leave the cathedral after the ceremony, the representatives of the republics of Genoa and Venice would lead the horse— the Genoese walking on the right, the Venetian on the left. At the coronation of Peter II in October 1372, a bloody fight began after the Venetian usurped the position of the Genoese and continued at the banquet. After the Genoese took Famagusta in 1373, both coronations were held in Nicosia.

== Table ==
Date (feast day)	Place	Recipient (status)	Officiant (office)	References
25 December 1100 (Christmas)	Church of the Nativity, Bethlehem	Baldwin I (king)	Daimbert of Pisa (patriarch of Jerusalem)	
25 December 1118 (Christmas)	Church of the Nativity, Bethlehem	Baldwin II (king)	Warmund of Picquigny? (patriarch of Jerusalem)	
25 December 1118 (Christmas)	Church of the Nativity, Bethlehem	Morphia of Melitene (queen consort)	Warmund of Picquigny? (patriarch of Jerusalem)	
14 September 1131 (Exaltation of the Cross)	Church of the Holy Sepulchre, Jerusalem	Fulk of Anjou (jure uxoris king)	William of Malines (patriarch of Jerusalem)	
14 September 1131 (Exaltation of the Cross)	Church of the Holy Sepulchre, Jerusalem	Melisende (queen regnant)	William of Malines (patriarch of Jerusalem)	
25 December 1143 (Christmas)	Church of the Holy Sepulchre, Jerusalem	Melisende (queen regnant)	William of Malines (patriarch of Jerusalem)	
25 December 1143 (Christmas)	Church of the Holy Sepulchre, Jerusalem	Baldwin III (king)	William of Malines (patriarch of Jerusalem)	
September 1158	Church of the Holy Sepulchre, Jerusalem	Theodora Komnene (queen consort)	Aimery of Limoges (patriarch of Antioch)	
18 February 1163 (Saint Simeon of Jerusalem)	Church of the Holy Sepulchre, Jerusalem	Amalric (king)	Amalric of Nesle (patriarch of Jerusalem)	
29 August 1167 (Beheading of John the Baptist)	Cathedral of the Holy Cross, Tyre	Maria Komnene (queen consort)	Amalric of Nesle (patriarch of Jerusalem)	
29 August 1167 (Beheading of John the Baptist)	Cathedral of the Holy Cross, Tyre	Amalric (king)	Amalric of Nesle (patriarch of Jerusalem)	
15 July 1174 (Dedication of the Church of the Holy Sepulchre)	Church of the Holy Sepulchre, Jerusalem	Baldwin IV (king)	Amalric of Nesle (patriarch of Jerusalem)	
20 November 1183 (Saint Edmund the Martyr)	Church of the Holy Sepulchre, Jerusalem	Baldwin V (king)	Heraclius (patriarch of Jerusalem)	
mid-September 1186	Church of the Holy Sepulchre, Jerusalem	Sibylla (queen regnant)	Heraclius (patriarch of Jerusalem)	
mid-September 1186	Church of the Holy Sepulchre, Jerusalem	Guy of Lusignan (jure uxoris king)	Heraclius (patriarch of Jerusalem)	
January 1198	Acre	Isabella I (queen regnant)	Aymar the Monk (patriarch of Jerusalem)	
January 1198	Acre	Aimery of Lusignan (jure uxoris king)	Aymar the Monk (patriarch of Jerusalem)	
3 October 1210	Cathedral of the Holy Cross, Tyre	Maria of Montferrat (queen regnant)	Albert of Vercelli (patriarch of Jerusalem)	
3 October 1210	Cathedral of the Holy Cross, Tyre	John of Brienne (jure uxoris king)	Albert of Vercelli (patriarch of Jerusalem)	
August 1225	Cathedral of the Holy Cross, Tyre	Isabella II (queen regnant)	Simon of Maugastel (archbishop of Tyre)	
24 September 1269	Cathedral of the Holy Cross, Tyre	Hugh I (king)	John of Troyes (bishop of Lydda)	
15 August 1286 (Assumption of Mary)	Cathedral of the Holy Cross, Tyre	Henry II (king)	Bonacursus de Gloire (archbishop of Tyre)	
13 May 1324	Cathedral of Saint Nicholas, Famagusta	Hugh II (titular king)	?	
13 May 1324	Cathedral of Saint Nicholas, Famagusta	Alice of Ibelin (titular queen consort)	?	
5 April 1360 (Easter Sunday)	Cathedral of Saint Nicholas, Famagusta	Peter I (titular king)	Peter Thomas (papal legate)	
5 April 1360 (Easter Sunday)	Cathedral of Saint Nicholas, Famagusta	Eleanor of Aragon (titular queen consort)	Peter Thomas (papal legate)	
10 October 1372	Cathedral of Saint Nicholas, Famagusta	Peter II (titular king)	?	

== Bibliography ==
- Barber, Malcolm (2012). The Crusader States. Yale University Press. ISBN 978-0-300-11312-9.
- Edbury, Peter W. (2020). "Famagusta and the Lusignan Kingdom of Cyprus, 1192-1374". Mediterranean Nexus 1100-1700. Vol. 8. Turnhout, Belgium: Brepols Publishers. pp. 19–33. doi:10.1484/m.mednex-eb.5.121381. ISBN 978-2-503-59041-7.
- Gerish, Deborah (2006). "Holy War, Royal Wives, and Equivocation in Twelfth-Century Jerusalem". In Naill Christie; Maya Yazigis (eds.). Noble Ideals and Bloody Realities. Brill. ISBN 9047409124.
- Gerlitz, Iris (2 June 2015). "'The King is Dead, Long Live the King': Representing Transfer of Power in the Crusader Estoire de Eracles". In Bartal, Renana; Vorholt, Hanna (eds.). Between Jerusalem and Europe: Essays in Honour of Bianca Kühnel. BRILL. pp. 34–54. doi:10.1163/9789004298187_004. ISBN 978-90-04-29818-7.
- Hamilton, Bernard (1978). "Women in the Crusader States: The Queens of Jerusalem". In Derek Baker (ed.). Medieval Women. Ecclesiastical History Society. ISBN 0631125396.
- Hamilton, Bernard (2000). The Leper King and His Heirs: Baldwin IV and the Crusader Kingdom of Jerusalem. Cambridge University Press. ISBN 9780521017473.
- Mayer, Hans Eberhard (1967). "Das Pontifikale von Tyrus und die Krönung der Lateinischen Könige von Jerusalem: Zugleich ein Beitrag zur Forschung über Herrschaftszeichen und Staatssymbolik". Dumbarton Oaks Papers (in German). 21. Dumbarton Oaks, Trustees for Harvard University: 141–232. doi:10.2307/1291262. ISSN 0070-7546. JSTOR 1291262.
- Murray, Alan V. (2015). "Women in the Royal Succession of the Latin Kingdom of Jerusalem (1099–1291)". In Zey, Claudia (ed.). Mächtige Frauen? Königinnen und Fürstinnen im europäischen Mittelalter (11.–14. Jahrhundert). Jan Thorbecke Verlag. pp. 131–162. ISBN 978-3-7995-5176-2.
- Murray, Alan V. (2022). Baldwin of Bourcq: Count of Edessa and King of Jerusalem, 1100-1131. Rulers of the Latin East. Routledge. ISBN 9780367545307.
- Nicolaou-Konnari, Angel (2020). "Women in Medieval Famagusta: Law, Family, and Society". Famagusta. Mediterranean Nexus 1100-1700. Vol. 8. Brepols Publishers. pp. 509–633. doi:10.1484/M.MEDNEX-EB.5.121392. ISBN 978-2-503-59041-7.
- Olympios, Michalis (2014). "The Shifting Mantle of Jerusalem: Ecclesiastical Architecture in Lusignan Famagusta". Famagusta. Mediterranean Nexus 1100-1700. Vol. 2. Brepols Publishers. doi:10.1484/M.MEDNEX-EB.5.106101. ISBN 978-2-503-54130-3.
- Riley-Smith, Jonathan (1973). The feudal nobility and the kingdom of Jerusalem, 1147 - 1277. Macmillan. ISBN 0-333-06379-1.
- Runciman, Steven (1954). A History of the Crusades: The Kingdom of Acre, and the later Crusades. The third crusade. University Press.
- Runciman, Steven (1957) [1952]. A history of the Crusades: Volume 2 The Kingdom of Jerusalem and the Frankish East 1100-1187. Cambridge: University Press. OCLC 1244775664.
- Setton, Kenneth Meyer; Hazard, Harry W. (1975). The Fourteenth and Fifteenth Centuries. Univ of Wisconsin Press. ISBN 978-0-299-06670-3.
