= Cathedral of the Holy Cross, Tyre =

Cathedral of the Holy Cross
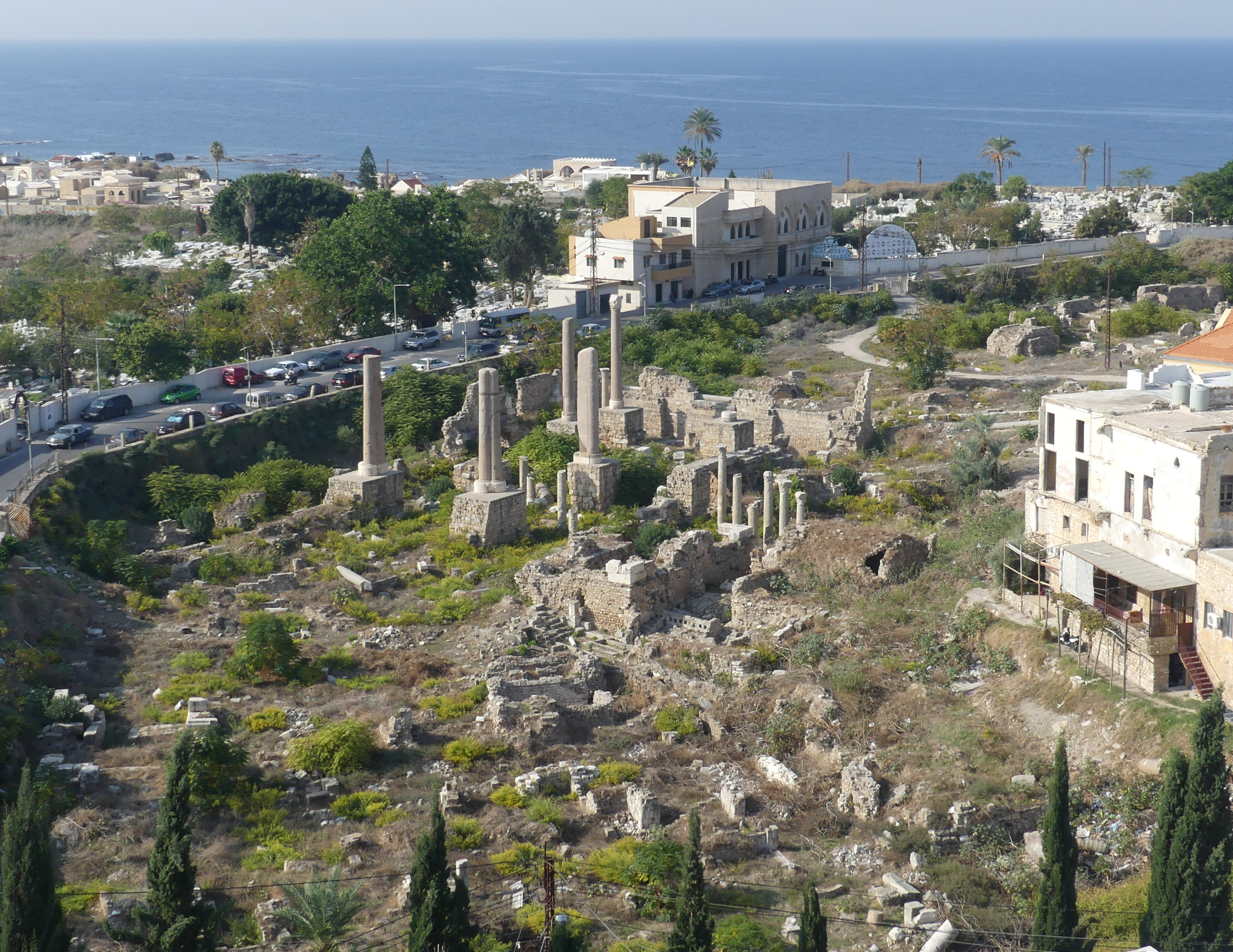
- The ruins of the Cathedral of the Holy Cross
- Cathedral of the Holy Cross
- 33°16′13.3″N 35°11′42.5″E
- Location: Tyre, South Governorate, Lebanon
- Denomination: Catholic (Latin)
- Tradition: Christianity

History
- Status: Cathedral (ruins)
- Founded: 1129
- Dedication: Holy Cross

Architecture
- Functional status: Destroyed
- Demolished: 1291 (Fall of Outremer)

Administration
- Diocese: Archdiocese of Tyre

The Cathedral of the Holy Cross in Tyre (modern-day Lebanon) was the seat of the Archdiocese of Tyre in the Crusader period. It was built in 1129 under the rule of William I of Tyre and dedicated to the Holy Cross on the site of a Byzantine church.

== History ==
The cathedral was built in the Venetian quarter of Tyre, which contained several churches, among them the Church of Saint Mark on the ruins of the Great Fatimid Mosque, which itself had been built on the site of the temple of Melqart.

One of the most famous clergymen who served there was William of Tyre, who held his post between 1175 and 1185. After the fall of Jerusalem to the Ayyubids under Saladin, the cathedral became the traditional site of the coronations of the kings and queens of Jerusalem and the venue of royal weddings, considered one of the largest and most important church buildings in the Latin Kingdom of Jerusalem.

The bones of Emperor Frederick Barbarossa were interred there in 1190. The Bavarian historian and politician Johann Nepomuk Sepp attempted to locate them under the reign of King William I of Prussia in 1874, but without success.

The cathedral was damaged by the 1202 Syria earthquake and was finally destroyed in 1291 following the fall of the city to the Mamluks.

== Gallery ==
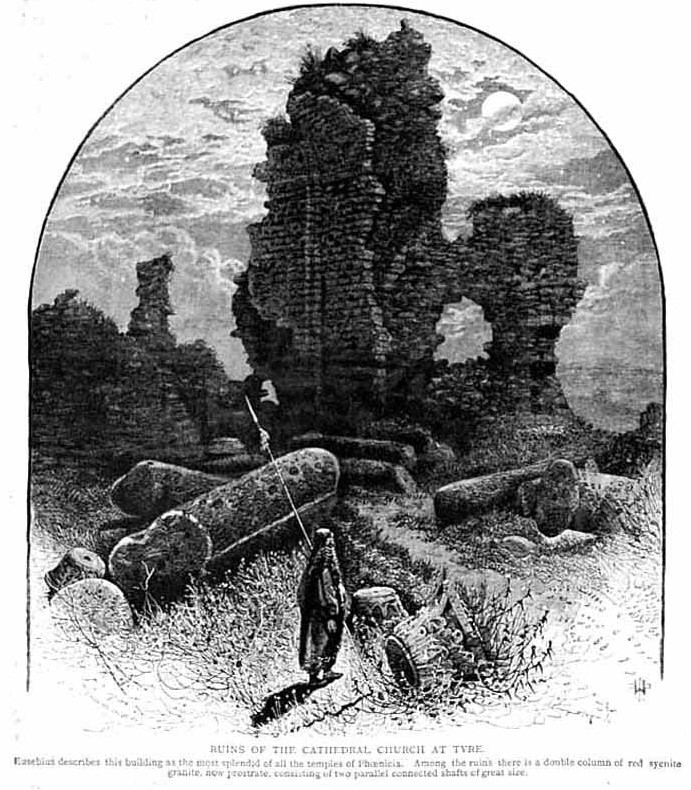
19th century print

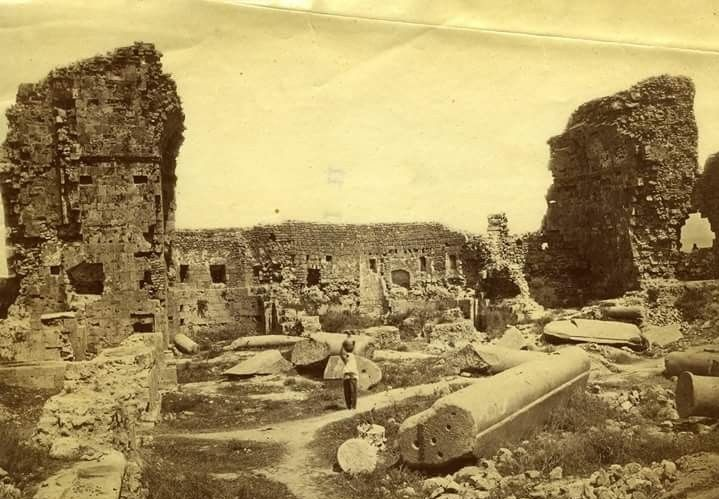
Photograph in 1870

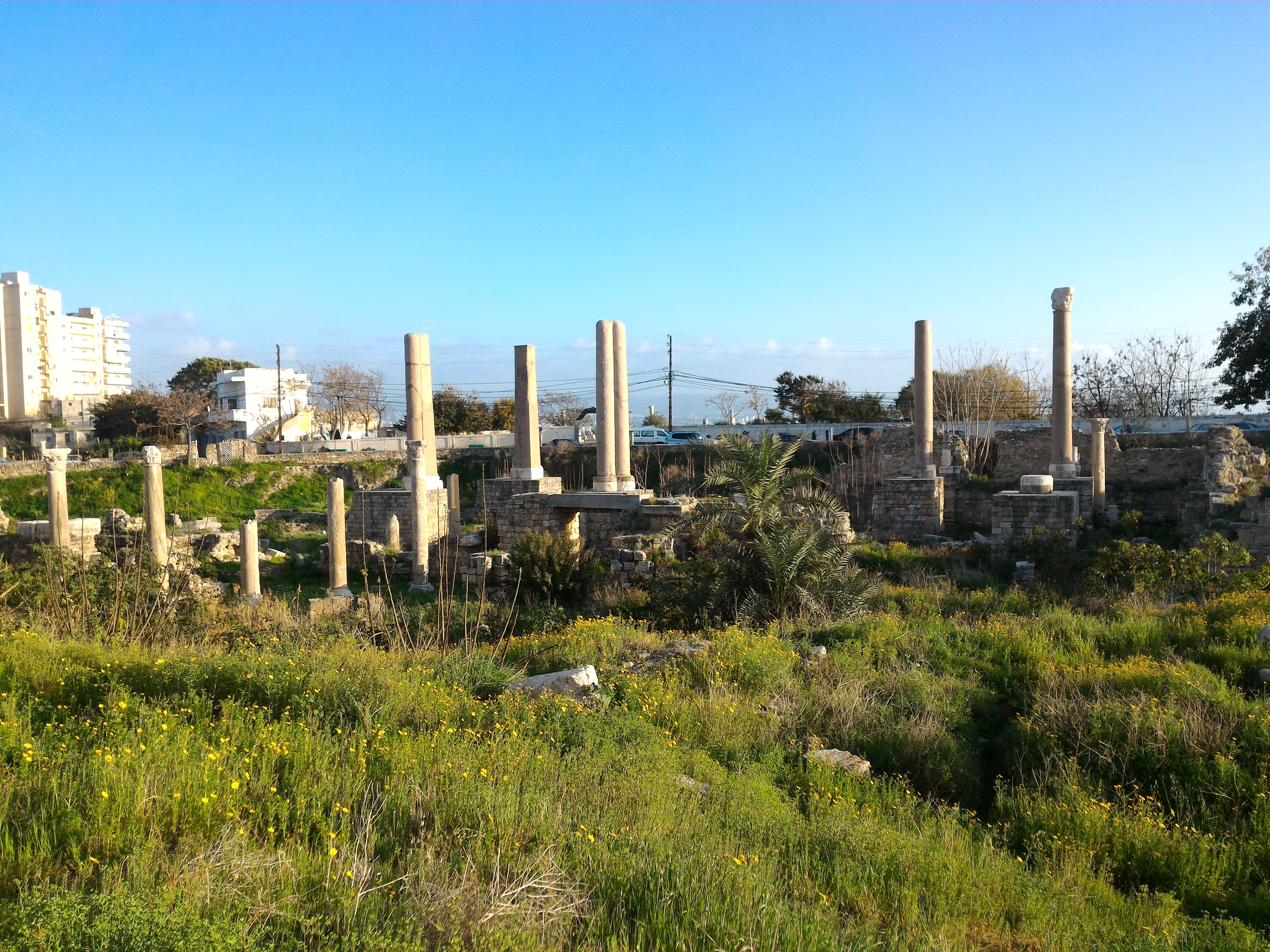
The site in 2015

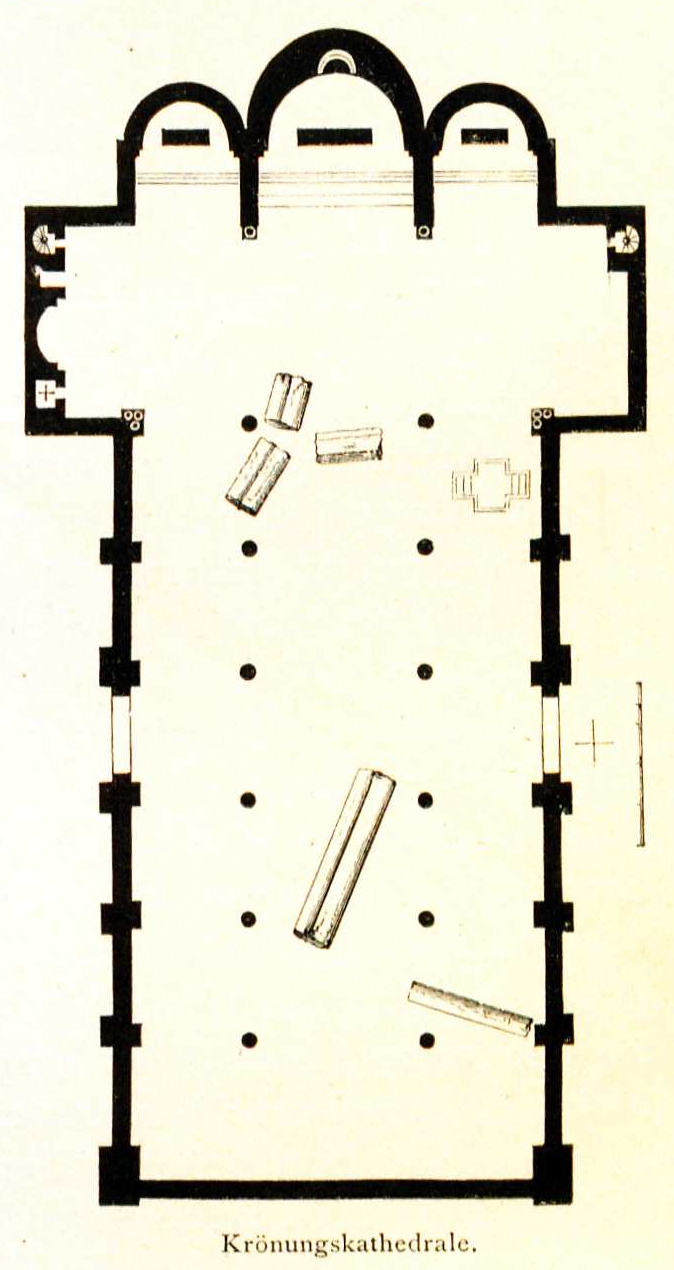
Plan of the cathedral by Johann Nepomuk Sepp
