= Hugh =

Male given name

- Pronunciation: /hjuː/ hew
- Gender: Male
- Language: English

Origin
- Meaning: Heart, Mind, Soul
- Region of origin: England

Other names
- Alternative spelling: Hughes
- Nicknames: Huey, Hughie, Shug, Shuggie
- Related names: Hugues, Hugo, Hubert, Hauke, Huw, Ugo

Hugh is the English-language variant of the masculine given name Hugues, itself the Old French variant of Hugo, a short form of Continental Germanic given names beginning in the element *hug- "mind, spirit" (Old English hyġe).

The Germanic name is on record beginning in the 8th century, in variants Chugo, Hugo, Huc, Ucho, Ugu, Uogo, Ogo, Ougo, etc. The name's popularity in the Middle Ages ultimately derives from its use by Frankish nobility, beginning with Duke of the Franks and Count of Paris Hugh the Great (898–956). The Old French form was adopted into English from the Norman period (e.g. Hugh of Montgomery, 2nd Earl of Shrewsbury d. 1098; Hugh d'Avranches, 1st Earl of Chester, d. 1101).

The spelling Hugh in English is from the Picard variant spelling Hughes, where the orthography -gh- takes the role of -gu- in standard French, i.e. to express the phoneme /g/ as opposed to the affricate /ʒ/ taken by the grapheme g before front vowels (as in Italian). The modern English pronunciation /hjuː/ is influenced by the Norman variant form Hue (/hyː/, /yː/), now only a surname, mainly from Normandy.

The Old High German name Hugo was adopted as third declension nominative into Middle Latin (Hugo, Hugonis); in English, however, historical figures of the continental Middle Ages are conventionally given the name in its modern English spelling, as in Hugh Capet (941–996), Hugh Magnus of France (1007–1025), Hugh of Cluny (1024–1109), Hugh of Châteauneuf (1053–1132), etc.

Modern variants of the name include German Hugo, Dutch Huig, Frisian Hauke, Welsh Huw, Italian Ugo.

In the tradition of anglicisation of Gaelic names by using similar-sounding, but etymologically unrelated replacements, Hugh also serves as a replacement for Aodh and Ùisdean (see Hughes (surname), Hughes (given name)).

== People with the mononym ==
=== Noblemen and clergy ===
==== French ====
- Hugh the Great (died 956), Duke of the Franks
- Hugh Magnus of France (1007–1025), co-King of France under his father, Robert II
- Hugh, Duke of Alsace (died 895), modern-day France
- Hugh of Austrasia (7th century), Mayor of the Palace of Austrasia
- Hugh I, Count of Angoulême (1183–1249)
- Hugh II, Count of Angoulême (1221–1250)
- Hugh III, Count of Angoulême (13th century)
- Hugh IV, Count of Angoulême (1259–1303)
- Hugh, Bishop of Avranches (11th century), France
- Hugh I, Count of Blois (died 1248)
- Hugh II, Count of Blois (died 1307)
- Hugh of Brienne (1240–1296), Count of the medieval French County of Brienne
- Hugh I of Burgundy (1057–1093)
- Hugh II of Burgundy (1084–1143)
- Hugh III of Burgundy (1142–1192)
- Hugh IV of Burgundy (1213–1272)
- Hugh V of Burgundy (1294–1315)
- Hugh Capet (939–996), King of France
- Hugh, Count of Champagne (c. 1074–1125)
- Hugh of Châteauneuf (1052–1132), Bishop of Grenoble
- Hugh of Cluny (1024–1109), French Abott, later canonized as Saint Hugh the Great
- Hugh I of Cyprus (1195–1218)
- Hugh II of Cyprus (1253–1267)
- Hugh III of Cyprus and Hugh I of Jerusalem (1235–1284)
- Hugh IV of Cyprus (1295–1359)
- Hugh of Die (1040–1106), French papal legate, and Archbishop of Lyon
- Hugh, abbot of Lagny (died 1171), France
- Hugh of Lincoln (1140–1200), aka Hugh of Avalon or Hugh of Burgundy
- Hugh I of Lusignan (early tenth century)
- Hugh II of Lusignan (died 967)
- Hugh III of Lusignan (late tenth century)
- Hugh IV of Lusignan (died 1026)
- Hugh V of Lusignan (died 1060)
- Hugh VI of Lusignan (died 1110)
- Hugh VII of Lusignan (1065–1151)
- Hugh VIII of Lusignan (12th century)
- Hugh IX of Lusignan (1163 or 1168 – 1219)
- Hugh X of Lusignan (1195–1249)
- Hugh XI of Lusignan (1221–1250)
- Hugh XII of Lusignan (13th century)
- Hugh XIII of Lusignan (1259–1303)
- Hugh I of Maine (ruled 900–933)
- Hugh II of Maine (ruled 950–992)
- Hugh III of Maine (960–1015)
- Hugh IV of Maine (died 1051)
- Hugh V of Maine (died 1131)
- Hugh I, Count of Rethel (1040–1118)
- Hugh II, Count of Rethel (died 1227)
- Hugh III of Rethel (1227–1242)
- Hugh IV, Count of Rethel (1244–1285)
- Hugh (abbot of Saint-Quentin) (802–844), France
- Hugh, Count of Soissons (died 1305), France
- Hugh of Toulouse (died 978), France
- Hugh (archbishop of Vienne) (died 1155), France

==== Anglo-Norman/English ====
- Hugh (Dean of York), first Dean of York
- Hugh d'Avranches, 1st Earl of Chester (died 1101)
- Hugh Bigod, 1st Earl of Norfolk (1095–1177), second son of Roger Bigod, Sheriff of Norfolk
- Hugh de Kevelioc, 3rd Earl of Chester (1147–1181)
- Hugh Bigod, 3rd Earl of Norfolk (1182–1225), eldest son of Roger Bigod, Sheriff of Norfolk
- Hugh le Despencer (justiciar) (1223–1265), Baron le Despencer
- Hugh le Despenser (sheriff) (died 1238), High Sheriff of Berkshire
- Hugh le Despenser the Elder, 1st Earl of Winchester (1261–1326)
- Hugh Despenser the Younger (1286–1326), son of Hugh le Despenser, Earl of Winchester
- Hugh, Baron Dacre of Glanton Trevor-Roper (1914–2003), a British historian
- Hugh Percy (disambiguation)
- Hugh Seymour (disambiguation)

==== Gaelic ====
- Hugh of Sleat (died 1498), chieftain of Clan Donald
- Hugh O'Neill, 2nd Earl of Tyrone (1540–1616), Irish chieftain who resisted the annexation of Ireland by Elizabeth I of England
- Hugh Roe O'Donnell (1572–1602), Prince of Tyrconnell, led a rebellion against English government in Ireland
- Hugh Dubh O'Neill (1611–1660), Irish soldier who commanded the defenders in the Siege of Clonmel and Siege of Limerick
- Hugh O'Neill, 1st Baron Rathcavan (1883–1982), Ulster Unionist politician who served as Father of the House of Commons

The Gaelic name Aodh/Aedh/Aed is often translated into English as Hugh. Persons sharing this name who traditionally use the Gaelic form are listed below:

- Áed Rúad, legendary High king of Ireland
- Áed mac Echach (died 575), king of Connacht
- Áed Dub mac Suibni (died 588), king of Dál nAraidi
- Áed Dibchine (died c.595), king of Leinster
- Áed mac Ainmuirech (died 598), High king of Ireland
- Áed Sláine (died 604), High king of Ireland
- Áed Rón mac Cathail (died 604), king in Leinster
- Áed Uaridnach (died 612), High king of Ireland
- Áed Bennán mac Crimthainn (died 618), king of or in Munster
- Áed Dub mac Colmáin (died 639), bishop of Kildare
- Áed Aired (died 698), king of Dál nAraide
- Áed Róin (died 735), king of Dál Fiatach
- Áed mac Colggen (died 738), king of Leinster
- Áed Balb mac Indrechtaig (died 742), king of Connacht
- Áed Muinderg (died 747), king of northern Uí Néill
- Áed Find (died 778), king of Dál Riata
- Áed Oirdnide (died 819), king of Ailech
- Áed mac Boanta (died 839), probably king in Dál Riata
- Áed of Scotland (died 878), king of the Picts
- Áed Findliath (died 879), king of Ailech
- Áed Ua Crimthainn (mid 12th century), abbot of Terryglass
- Aedh mac Cathal Crobdearg Ua Conchobair (13th century), king of Connacht
- Aedh Muimhnech mac Felim Ua Conchobair (13th century), king of Connacht
- Aedh mac Ruaidri Ua Conchobair (13th century), king of Connacht
- Aedh mac Aedh Breifneach Ua Conchobair (14th century)
- Aodh, Earl of Ross (died 1333)

=== Other people ===
- Hugh of Arles or Hugh of Provence (10th century), King of Italy
- Hugh, Margrave of Tuscany aka Hugo or Ugo (950–1001), Italy
- Hugh, Count of Suio (1023–1040), Count of Suio in the Duchy of Gaeta, Italy
- Hugh of Saint Victor (1078–1141), Saxon noble and mystic philosopher
- Hugh of Ibelin (12th century), noble in the Kingdom of Jerusalem
- Hugh of Jabala (12th century), bishop of Jabala, Syria
- Hugh (archbishop of Edessa) (died 1144), Upper Mesopotamia
- Hugh (archbishop of Palermo) (died c. 1165/6)

== People with the given name ==
- Hugh Aitken (composer) (1924–2012), American composer
- Hugh Aitken (curler), Scottish curler
- Hugh G. J. Aitken (1922–1994), American scholar, recipient of the Leonardo da Vinci Medal
- Hugh Alan Anderson (1933–2015), Canadian politician
- Hugh D. Auchincloss (1897–1976), American stockbroker and lawyer, stepfather of Gore Vidal and Jacqueline Kennedy Onassis
- Hugh Beaumont (1910–1982), American actor
- Hugh M. Bland (1898–1967), Justice of the Arkansas Supreme Court
- Hugh Bonneville (born 1963), English actor
- Hugh Carey (1919–2011), American politician and attorney of the Democratic Party
- Hugh Cornwell (born 1949), English musician, guitarist
- Hugh Dancy (born 1975), English actor
- Hugh Dane (1942–2018), American actor
- Hugh Dennis (born 1962), British Actor and Comedian
- Hugh Edmund Peter de Mel (1907–1992), Sri Lankan Sinhala politician
- Hugh Downs (1921–2020), American broadcaster and announcer
- Hugh Fearnley-Whittingstall (born 1965), English chef, broadcaster and campaigner
- Warnakulasuriya Ichchampullige Hugh Fernando (1916–1993), Sri Lankan Sinhala politician
- Hugh Norman Gregory Fernando (1910–1976), Chief Justice of Sri Lanka from 1966–1973
- Hughie Gallacher (1903–1957), Scottish footballer
- Hugh Glass (1783–1833), American frontiersman
- Hugh Grant (born 1960), English actor
- Hugh Griffith (1912–1980), Welsh actor
- Hugh Hefner (1926–2017), American adult magazine publisher
- Hugh Herbert (1885–1952), American motion picture comedian
- Hugh Herdon (1871–1958), British Indian Army officer
- Hugh Hopper (1945–2009), English musician, bassist
- Hugh Jackman (born 1968), Australian actor
- Hugh Lane (1875–1915), Irish art collector
- Hugh Laurie (born 1959), English actor
- Hugh McDowell (1953–2018), English cellist, member of Electric Light Orchestra
- Hugh McElhenny (1928–2022), American football (gridiron) player
- Hugh Mercer (1726–1777), Scottish-born American military officer
- Hugh O'Brian (1925–2016), American actor
- Hugh Paddick (1915–2000), English actor
- Hugh V. Perkins (1918–1988), American human development and education author, researcher and professor
- Hugh Robertson (born 1989), American basketball player
- Hugh Fred Rupasinghe (1931-2019), Sri Lanka Army officer, commander of Security Forces Headquarters - Jaffna
- Hugh W. Sanford (1879–1961), American businessman and writer from Tennessee
- Hugh Segal (1950-2023), Canadian senator
- Hugh Thornton (born 1991), American football player
- Hugh Walpole (1884–1941), English novelist
- Hugh E. Wright (1879–1940), French-English actor

== Fictional characters ==
- Hugh (Kiba)
- Hugh Tazmanian Devil, a Taz-Mania character
- Hugh (Star Trek)
- Hugh "Wee Hughie" Campbell, a The Boys character
  - Hugh Campbell, Sr., Hughie's father
- Hugh Neutron, a Jimmy Neutron character
- Hugh Steeply, in the 1996 novel Infinite Jest by David Foster Wallace

== See also ==
- Hugh (disambiguation)
- Page titles beginning with "Hugh"
- Huginn
- Hyglac
