= Hugo =

Hugo or HUGO may refer to:

== Arts and entertainment ==
- Hugo (film), a 2011 film directed by Martin Scorsese
- Hugo Award, a science fiction and fantasy award named after Hugo Gernsback
- Hugo (franchise), a children's media franchise based on a troll
  - Hugo (game show), a television show that first ran from 1990 to 1995
  - Hugo (video game), several video games released between 1991 and 2000
- Hugo (album), a 2022 album by Loyle Carner

== People and fictional characters ==
- Hugo (name), including lists of people with Hugo as a given name or surname, as well as fictional characters
- Hugo (musician), Thai American actor and singer-songwriter Chulachak Chakrabongse (born 1981)
- Hugo (footballer, born 1964), Brazilian footballer
- Hugo (footballer, born 1974), Brazilian footballer
- Hugo (footballer, born 1976), Portuguese footballer
- Hugo (footballer, born 1980), Brazilian footballer
- Hugo (footballer, born 1983), Brazilian footballer
- Hugo (footballer, born 1997), Brazilian footballer
- Hugo (footballer, born 2001), Brazilian footballer

== Places in the United States ==
- Hugo, Alabama, an unincorporated community
- Hugo, Colorado, a Statutory Town
- Hugo, Minnesota, a town
- Hugo, Missouri, an unincorporated community
- Hugo, Oklahoma, a city
- Hugo, Oregon, an unincorporated area
- Hugo, West Virginia, an unincorporated community

== HUGO ==
- HUGO (cable system), a submarine telecommunications cable
- Human Genome Organisation
  - HUGO Gene Nomenclature Committee, often (incorrectly) referred to as "HUGO"
- Hawaiian Underwater Geological Observatory, see Kamaʻehuakanaloa Seamount

== Other uses ==
- Hugo (mascot), the mascot of the Charlotte Hornets team
- Hugo (software), a static site generator
- 2106 Hugo, an asteroid named after French writer Victor Hugo
- Hugo (crater), a crater on the planet Mercury
- Hugo's, a grocery chain in the United States
- Hurricane Hugo, a hurricane in September 1989
- HU-GO, an electric vehicle manufactured in Hafertepe University, Turkey
- Hugo (cocktail), a drink

== See also ==
- Hugh (disambiguation)
- Hughes (disambiguation)
- Hugues, a given name
- Huw, a given name
- Ugo (disambiguation)
