= Hugo (name) =

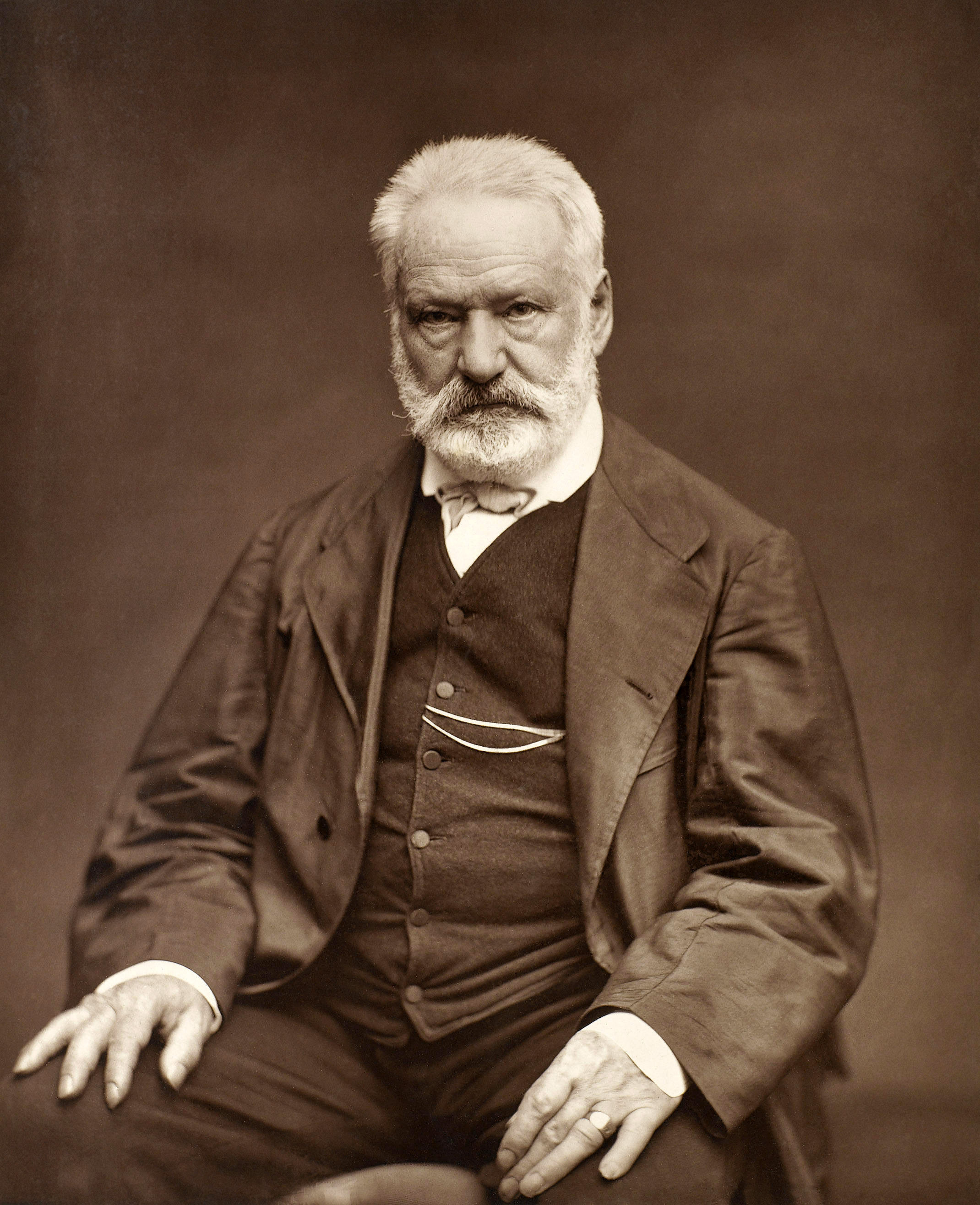
- French Romantic writer Victor Hugo
- Pronunciation: English: /ˈhjuːɡoʊ/ HEW-goh; French: [yɡo]; Spanish: [ˈuɣo]; German: [ˈhuːɡoː]; Dutch: [ˈɦyɣoː]; Finnish: [ˈhuɡo]
- Gender: Male
- Language: Spanish, German, Portuguese, French, English, Finnish
- Name day: Czech Republic: April 1; Germany: April 29; Estonia: February 3; Croatia: April 29, October 8 & November 26; Latvia: November 17; Poland: April 1, April 29 & November 17; Slovakia: April 1; Sweden: November 3; Finland: February 3

Origin
- Meaning: 'Mind', 'spirit'

Other names
- Related names: Hugh, Hugues, Ugo, Hauke, Huw

Hugo is a surname and a masculine given name of German origin. The English version of the name is Hugh, the Italian version is Ugo.

The name Hugo is actually a short form of old names like Hugbert and Hugbald. The name is derived from Old High German hugu, meaning 'sense, mind, thought', and hugōn, meaning 'to think'. In other words, Hugo means thinker or clever.

Hugo is one of the most popular given names in Europe, ranking as high as #8 in Belgium in 2006.

== Notable people ==
=== Surname ===
- Adèle Hugo (1830–1915), French diarist
- Chad Hugo (born 1974), American musician and record producer
- Charles Hugo (disambiguation), several people
- Francis Hugo (1870–1930), American politician
- François-Victor Hugo (1828–1873), French writer and translator
- Graeme Hugo (1946–2015), Australian demographer
- Gustav Hugo (1764–1844), German jurist
- Jean Hugo (1894–1984), French painter, illustrator, theatre designer and author
- Jean Hugo (golfer) (born 1975), South African golfer
- Jeanne Hugo (1869–1941), French socialite
- Joseph Léopold Sigisbert Hugo, French general and the father of Victor Hugo
- Julie Hugo (1797–1865), French painter
- Léopoldine Hugo (1824–1843), French socialite
- Ludwig Maria Hugo (1871–1935), German Roman Catholic bishop in Mainz
- Petrus Hugo (1917–1986), South African fighter pilot and flying ace in the Royal Air Force during World War II
- Pieter Hugo (born 1976), South African photographer
- Victor Hugo (1802–1885), French writer, statesman and human rights activist
- Victor Hugo (cricketer) (1877–1930), Australian cricketer
- Walter Hugo, British artist

=== Given name ===
- Hugo, Margrave of Hachberg-Sausenberg (died 1444), German noble
- Hugo Alfvén (1872–1960), Swedish composer, conductor, violinist, and painter
- Hugo Almeida (born 1984), Portuguese footballer
- Hugo Alves Velame (born 1974), Brazilian footballer
- Hugo Ärnfast (1908–1965), Swedish diplomat
- Hugo Ball (1886–1927), German author, poet, founder of the Dada movement and the Cabaret Voltaire
- Hugo Barra, Brazilian computer scientist
- Hugo Barth (1903–1976), German decathlete
- Hugo Black (1886–1971), US Supreme Court Justice
- Hugo Black Jr. (1922–2013), American lawyer
- Hugo Black III (1953–2007), American lawyer
- Hugo Bolin (born 2003), Swedish footballer
- Hugo Bonemer (born 1987), Brazilian actor, presenter and musician
- Hugo Ferdinand Boss (1885–1948), German fashion designer
- Prince Hugo de Bourbon de Parme (born 1997), member of the Dutch royal family
- Hugo Burge (1972–2023), British business executive and entrepreneur
- Hugo Burnand, British photographer
- Hugo Cabral (born 1988), Brazilian footballer
- Hugo Calderano (born 1996), Brazilian table tennis player
- Hugo Cancio (born 1964), Cuban-born American businessman and political activist
- Hugo Chakrabongse (born 1981), Thai royal and singer-songwriter
- Hugo Chávez (1954–2013), politician, President of Venezuela
- Hugo Corro (1953–2007), Argentine boxer
- Hugo Cumbo (born 1996), judoka from Vanuatu
- Hugo Dittberner (born 1944), German writer
- Hugo Eckener (1868–1954), German airship commander
- Hugo Ekitike (born 2002), French footballer
- Hugo Ernst (1876–1954), Croatian-born American labor union leader
- Hugo Fernández Artucio (born c. 1910s), Uruguayan academic and activist
- Hugo Fernández Faingold (fl. c. 2000), Uruguayan politician
- Hugo Ferreira de Farias (born 1997), Brazilian footballer
- Hugo Gadd (1885–1968), Swedish Army major general
- Hugo Gellert (1892–1985), Hungarian-born artist
- Hugo Gernsback (1884–1967), American science-fiction publisher
- Hugo van der Goes (1430?–1482) Flemish painter
- Hugo Gonçalves Ferreira Neto (born 2001), Brazilian footballer
- Hugo González (disambiguation), multiple people
- Hugo Grotius (1583–1645), Dutch forefather of international law theory
- Hugo Hamilton (disambiguation), multiple people
- Hugo von Hofmannsthal (1874–1929), Austrian writer
- Hugo Houle (born 1990), Canadian cyclist
- Hugo Huppert (1902–1982), Austrian poet, translator, and writer
- Hugo Johansson (1887–1977), Swedish sport shooter
- Hugo Josefsson, Swedish philatelist
- Hugo Junkers (1859–1935), German aircraft designer
- Hugo von Kayser (1873–1949), German general
- Hugo Keto (born 1998), Finnish footballer
- Hugo Koblet (1925–1964), Swiss champion cyclist
- Hugo Kołłątaj (1750–1812), Polish constitutional reformer and educationalist
- Hugo de Lantins (fl. 1420–1430), French-Flemish composer
- Hugo Launicke (1909–1975), German resistance fighter against the Nazi régime
- Hugo Laur (1893–1977), Estonian actor
- Hugo Leclercq (born 1994), French record producer and musician
- Hugo Leistner (1902–2002), American hurdler
- Hugo Leonardo (born 2004), Brazilian footballer
- Hugo Lloris (born 1986), French goalkeeper, plays for Tottenham and France national team
- Hugo Loetscher (1929–2009), Swiss writer
- Hugo López-Gatell Ramírez (born 1969), Mexican epidemiologist
- Hugo Motta (born 1989), Brazilian physician and politician
- Hugo Henrique Assis do Nascimento (born 1980), Brazilian footballer
- Hugo Nys (born 1991), French tennis player
- Hugo Ott (1931–2022), German historian and academic
- Hugo Pärtelpoeg (1899–1951), Estonian lawyer and politician
- Hugo Passos (born 1979), amateur Portuguese Greco-Roman wrestler
- Hugo Pratt (1927–1995), Italian comic book creator
- Hugo Reid (1809–1852), Scottish rancher and ethnographer
- Hugo Relander (1865–1947), Finnish mathematician and politician
- Hugo Rifkind (born 1977), Scottish journalist
- Hugo Robus (1885–1964), American sculptor
- Hugo Rodallega (born 1985), Colombian footballer
- Hugo Salmela (1884–1918), Finnish military leader of the Red Guards in the 1918 Civil War
- Hugo Sánchez Márquez (born 1958), Mexican footballer
- Hugo Schmeisser (1884–1953), German weapons designer
- Hugo Paul Friedrich Schulz (1853–1932), Prussian pharmacist
- Hugo Schwyzer, American professor and writer
- Hugo Sofovich (1939–2003), Argentine filmmaker
- Hugo Souza (born 1999), Brazilian footballer
- Hugo Sperrle (1885–1953), German field marshal
- Hugo Theorell (1903–1982), Swedish scientist and Nobel Prize laureate in medicine
- Hugo Toivonen (born 2004), Finnish footballer
- Hugo Toom (born 2002), Estonian basketball player
- Hugo Treffner (1845–1912), Estonian educator and figure in the Estonian national awakening
- Hugo Vázquez (born 1968), Uruguayan basketball player
- Hugo Veloso Oliveira Silva (born 1984), Brazilian footballer
- Hugo Viana (born 1982), Brazilian mixed martial artist
- Hugo Viana (born 1983), Portuguese footballer
- Hugo Vieira (born 1988), Portuguese footballer
- Hugo Miguel Fernandes Vieira (born 1976), Portuguese footballer
- Hugo Weaving (born 1960), British actor
- Hugo White (1939–2014), Royal Navy officer and Governor of Gibraltar
- Hugo Young (1938–2003), British journalist
- Hugo Zuckermann (1881–1914), Jewish-Austrian poet and Zionist

== Fictional characters ==
- Hugo, a character from the Street Fighter III and Final Fight fighting game series
- Hugo, a character from the role-playing video game Suikoden III
- Hugo DeAngelis, a character in television series The Sopranos. Father-in-law to series protagonist Tony Soprano and father of his wife Carmela.
- Hugo Cabret, the protagonist of The Invention of Hugo Cabret and its film adaptation, Hugo
- Hugo Danner, the protagonist in Philip Wylie's 1930 novel Gladiator"
- Jungledyret Hugo, the main character of the Danish children's film series and a TV show of the same name
- Hugo Granger-Weasley, the son of Ron Weasley and Hermione Granger in the Harry Potter series by J.K. Rowling
- Hugo Drax, villain in Ian Fleming's James Bond novel Moonraker
- Hugo Habercore, the health inspector and secondary antagonist of Bob's Burgers
- Hugo Horton, character from the BBC sitcom The Vicar of Dibley
- Hugo "Hurley" Reyes, a main character in the television show Lost
- Hugo Simpson, Bart Simpson's twin brother from The Simpsons episode "Treehouse of Horror VII".
- Hugo the Abominable Snowman, a minor enemy of Bugs Bunny, loosely based on the yeti legend
- Hugo Strange, a DC Comics supervillain, notably being one of Batman's biggest adversaries
