= Hugues =

- Pronunciation: French: [yg]
- Gender: Male
- Language: French
- Name day: April 1

Origin
- Meaning: Mind, spirit
- Region of origin: France

Other names
- Related names: Hugh, Hugo, Ugo, Hauke, Huw

Hugues is a masculine given name most often found in Francophone countries, a variant of the originally Germanic name "Hugo" or "Hugh". The final 's' marks the nominative case in Old French (such as in English Charles, Giles, James, etc.), but is not retained by modern pronunciation. The old oblique case Hugon (Huon, Yon) disappeared.

Notable people bearing this name include:

- Crusader kings of Cyprus:
  - Hugues I de Lusignan (1194/1195–1218)
  - Hugues II de Lusignan (1252/1253–1267)
- Hugues, Bishop of Dié, (c. 1040–1106)
- Hugues Absil (born 1961), French painter
- Hugues Aubriot (died c. 1391), French administrator and heretic
- Hugues Aufray (born 1929), French singer
- Hugues Le Bars (1950–2014), French film music composer
- Hugues IV de Berzé (1150/1155–1220), French knight, crusader and poet
- Hugues Bousiges (born 1948), French civil servant
- Hugues Briatte (born 1990), French rugby union player
- Hugues Broussard (1934–2019), French Olympic swimmer
- Hugues Capet (c.939–996), first King of the Franks
- Hugues Cosnier (died 1629), French engineer
- Hugues de Châteauneuf (1053–1132), French Bishop, theologian and Catholic saint
- Hugues Cuénod (1902–2010), Swiss singer opera and musical stage singer
- Hugues-Wilfried Dah (born 1986), Burkinabé footballer
- Hugues Delorme (1868–1942), French poet, comedian, playwright and journalist
- Hugues Doneau (1527–1591), French law professor
- Hugues Duboscq (born 1981), French Olympic breaststroke swimmer
- Hugues Dufourt (born 1943), French composer and philosopher
- Hugues Fournel (born 1988), Canadian Olympic canoeist
- Hugues Gall (1940–2024), French opera manager
- Hugues le Grand (898–956), Duke of the Franks and Count of Paris
- Hugues Heney (1789–1844), Canadian lawyer and politician
- Hugues Krafft (1853–1935), French photographer
- Hugues Felicité Robert de Lamennais (1782–1854), French priest, philosopher and political theorist
- Hugues Lapointe (1911– 1982), Canadian politician and lawyer
- Hugues Legault (born 1974), Canadian swimmer
- Hugues de Lionne (1611–1671), French statesman
- Hugues Loubenx de Verdalle (1531–1595), French-born 52nd Grand Master of the Order of Malta
- Hugues-Bernard Maret, Duc de Bassano, (1763–1839), French statesman and journalist
- Hugues Obry (born 1973), French fencer and Olympic medalist
- Hugues Occansey (born 1966), French basketball player
- Hugues de Pairaud (12??-13??), French leader of the Knights Templar
- Hugues Panassié (1912–1974), French jazz critic and producer
- Hugues de Payens (c.1070–1136), French co-founder of the Knights Templar
- Hugues C. Pernath (1931–1975), Belgian writer
- Hugues de Pierrepont (????-1229), French Bishop of Liège
- Hugues Claude Pissarro (born 1935), French painter
- Hugues Portelli (born 1947), French politician
- Hugues Randin (1628–c.1680), French-born Canadian engineer
- Hugues Rebell (1867–1905), French author
- Hugues de Poitiers, (????-1187), French Benedictine monk
- Hugues de Romans (c. 1040–1106), French papal legate and Archbishop of Lyon
- Hugues de Roussan (born 1955), Canadian handball player and Olympic competitor
- Hugues de Saint-Cher (ca. 1200–1263), French Dominican friar and cardinal and theologian
- Hugues Sambin (ca. 1520–1601), French sculptor
- Hugues Sweeney (born ???), Canadian artist and web designer
- Hugues Taraval (1729–1785), French painter
- Hugues Tshiyinga Mafo (born 1983), Democratic Republic of Congo sprinter
- Hugues Wembangomo (born 1992), Democratic Republic of Congo-born Norwegian footballer
- Hugues Zagbayou (born 1990), Ivorian football player

== See also ==
- Hugh (disambiguation)
- Hughes (disambiguation)
- Huguette, a French given name
- Huw, a Welsh given name
