= Shuggie =

Shuggie is a given name. People and fictional characters with the name include:

- Shuggie Otis (born 1953), American musician
- Hugh "Shuggie" Bain, fictional protagonist of the 2020 novel Shuggie Bain by Douglas Stuart

== See also ==
- Hugh (given name)
