= Absil =

- Gender: Feminine
- Language: French

Other names
- Variant forms: Absile, Absillis

Absil is a surname. Notable people with the surname include:

- Hugues Absil (born 1961), French painter
- Jean Absil (1893–1974), Belgian composer
