= Gaulin =

Gaulin (pronounced [ɡolɛ̃]) is a French surname which is most prevalent among French Canadians and which may have been derived via Gaudelin from the Medieval Germanic feminine name Godelind/Godelinde/Gotlind/Gotlinde (Old High German got "god", "deity" + OHG lind "gentle", "soft", "mild").
Notable people with this name include:

- André Gaulin (born 1936), French Canadian politician
- Huguette Gaulin (1944–1972), French Canadian novelist
- Jean-Marc Gaulin (born 1962), Canadian ice hockey player
- Rémi Gaulin (1787–1857), Canadian Roman Catholic bishop
- Sasha Gaulin, American actress and circus performer
