= Huguette =

Huguette is a feminine French given name. Notable people with the name include:

- Huguette Bello (born 1950), politician from Reunion
- Huguette Béolet (born 1919), French table tennis player
- Huguette Biaujeaud (c.1910–1990), French economist
- Huguette Bohoussou, Ivorian footballer
- Huguette Bouchardeau (1935–2026), French politician, publisher, and writer
- Huguette Caland (1931–2019), Lebanese painter, sculptor and fashion designer
- Huguette M. Clark (1906–2011), French-American heiress and recluse
- Huguette Delavault (1924–2003), French mathematician
- Huguette Desjardins (born 1938), Canadian artist
- Huguette Dreyfus (1928–2016), French harpsichordist
- Huguette Duflos (1887–1982), French actress
- Huguette Gaulin (1944–1972), French novelist
- Huguette Labelle (born 1939), retired Canadian civil servant
- Huguette Lachapelle (1942–2021), Canadian politician
- Huguette Oligny (1922–2013), Canadian actress
- Huguette Peeters (born 1936), Belgian swimmer
- Huguette Plamondon (1926–2010), Canadian politician and trade unionist
- Huguette Tiegna (born 1982), French politician
- Huguette Tourangeau (1940–2018), French-Canadian operatic mezzo-soprano

== See also ==
- Hugues, a given name
