= Huw =

Huw (/hjuː/) is a Welsh given name, a variant of Hugo or Hugh.

== Notable people ==
- Huw Bennett (born 1983), Welsh rugby player
- Huw Bunford (born 1967), guitarist in the Welsh rock band Super Furry Animals
- Huw Cadwaladr, Welsh poet
- Huw Cae Llwyd (c. 1431 – c. 1504), Welsh poet
- Huw Ceredig (1942–2011), Welsh actor
- Huw Davies (chemist), British chemist
- Huw Davies (rugby union) (born 1959), English rugby union player
- Huw Dixon (born 1958), Professor of Economics at Cardiff University
- Huw Edwards (conductor), Welsh conductor
- Huw Edwards (born 1961), Welsh journalist, presenter and newsreader
- Huw Edwards (politician) (born 1953), Welsh Labour Party politician, and Member of Parliament
- Huw T. Edwards (1892–1970), Welsh trade union leader and politician
- Huw Edwards-Jones (born 1956), British cabinetmaker
- Huw Evans (born 1985), also known as H. Hawkline, Welsh singer-songwriter and radio and television presenter
- Huw Garmon (born 1966), Welsh actor
- Huw Gower, British guitarist
- Huw Higginson (born 1964), English actor
- Huw Irranca-Davies (born 1963), British Labour politician from Wales
- Huw Jenkins (born 1958), British businessman; CEO and Chairman of UBS Investment Bank
- Huw Jones (rugby union) (born 1993), Scottish Rugby Union player
- Huw Lewis, (born 1964), National Assembly for Wales member
- Huw Lawlor, (born 1996), Irish hurler
- Huw Lewis-Jones (born 1980), British historian, editor, broadcaster and art critic
- Huw Lloyd-Langton (1951–2012), English guitarist, Hawkwind
- Huw Menai (1886–1961), Welsh English-language poet
- Huw Pill, British economist, chief economist of the Bank of England
- Huw Pritchard (born 1976), Welsh racing cyclist
- Huw Justin Smith (1965–2007), also known as Pepsi Tate, Welsh bass guitarist
- Huw Spratling (born 1949), British composer
- Huw Stephens (born 1981), Welsh radio and television presenter
- Huw Swetnam, British slalom canoeist
- Huw Thomas Edwards (1892–1970), Welsh trade union leader and politician
- Huw Thomas (disambiguation), several people
- Huw van Steenis (born 1969), British banker
- Huw Warren (born 1962), Welsh jazz pianist and composer
- Huw Waters (born 1986), Welsh cricketer
- Huw Watkins (born 1976), British composer and pianist
- Huw Wheldon (1916–1986), BBC broadcaster and executive
- Huw Williams, Welsh football coach and former player
- Jeremy Huw Williams (born 1969), Welsh baritone opera singer
- Robert Huw Morgan (born 1967), Welsh-born organist, conductor and teacher
- Robin Huw Bowen (born 1957), Welsh triple harp player

== Fictional ==
- Huw Edwards (EastEnders), a character in the BBC soap opera EastEnders
- Huw Morgan, a character in the novel and film, How Green Was My Valley

== See also ==
- Hugh
- Hughes
- Hugo (name)
- Hugues, a given name
