= Andrew Pearson (cricketer) =

English cricketer (born 1957)

Personal information
- Full name: Andrew Stuart Pearson
- Born: 25 September 1957 (age 69); Rustington, Sussex
- Batting: Left-handed
- Bowling: Right-arm off break

Domestic team information
- Years: Team
- 1981–1987: Bedfordshire
- 1999: Northamptonshire Cricket Board

Career statistics
Competition	List A
Matches	2
Runs scored	43
Batting average	21.50
100s/50s	0/0
Top score	39
Catches/stumpings	1/–
- Source: Cricinfo, 3 August 2011

Andrew Stuart Pearson (born 25 September 1957) is a former English cricketer. Pearson was a left-handed batsman who bowled right-arm off break. He was born in Rustington, Sussex.

Having played for the Northamptonshire Second XI between 1974 and 1980, Pearson later made his debut for Bedfordshire against Buckinghamshire in the 1981 Minor Counties Championship. He played Minor counties cricket for Bedfordshire from 1981 to 1987, making 40 Minor Counties Championship appearances and 8 MCCA Knockout Trophy appearances. He made his List A debut against Somerset in the 1982 NatWest Trophy. In this match he scored 39 runs before being dismissed by Viv Richards. He made a further List A appearance against Gloucestershire in the 1985 NatWest Trophy. He scored 4 runs in this match, before being dismissed by David Lawrence. He later played a single MCCA Knockout Trophy match for the Northamptonshire Cricket Board against Suffolk.
