= Mary Christian Dundas Hamilton =

Scottish writer and poet

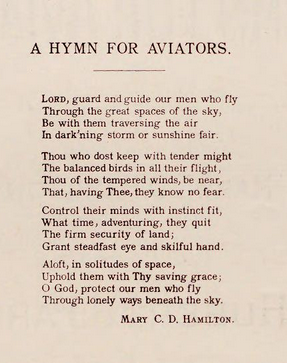
- Born: Mary Christian Dundas Hamilton; 24 May 1850; Edinburgh
- Died: 10 June 1943 (aged 93); Worthing, Sussex
- Writing career
- Genres: Author, poet

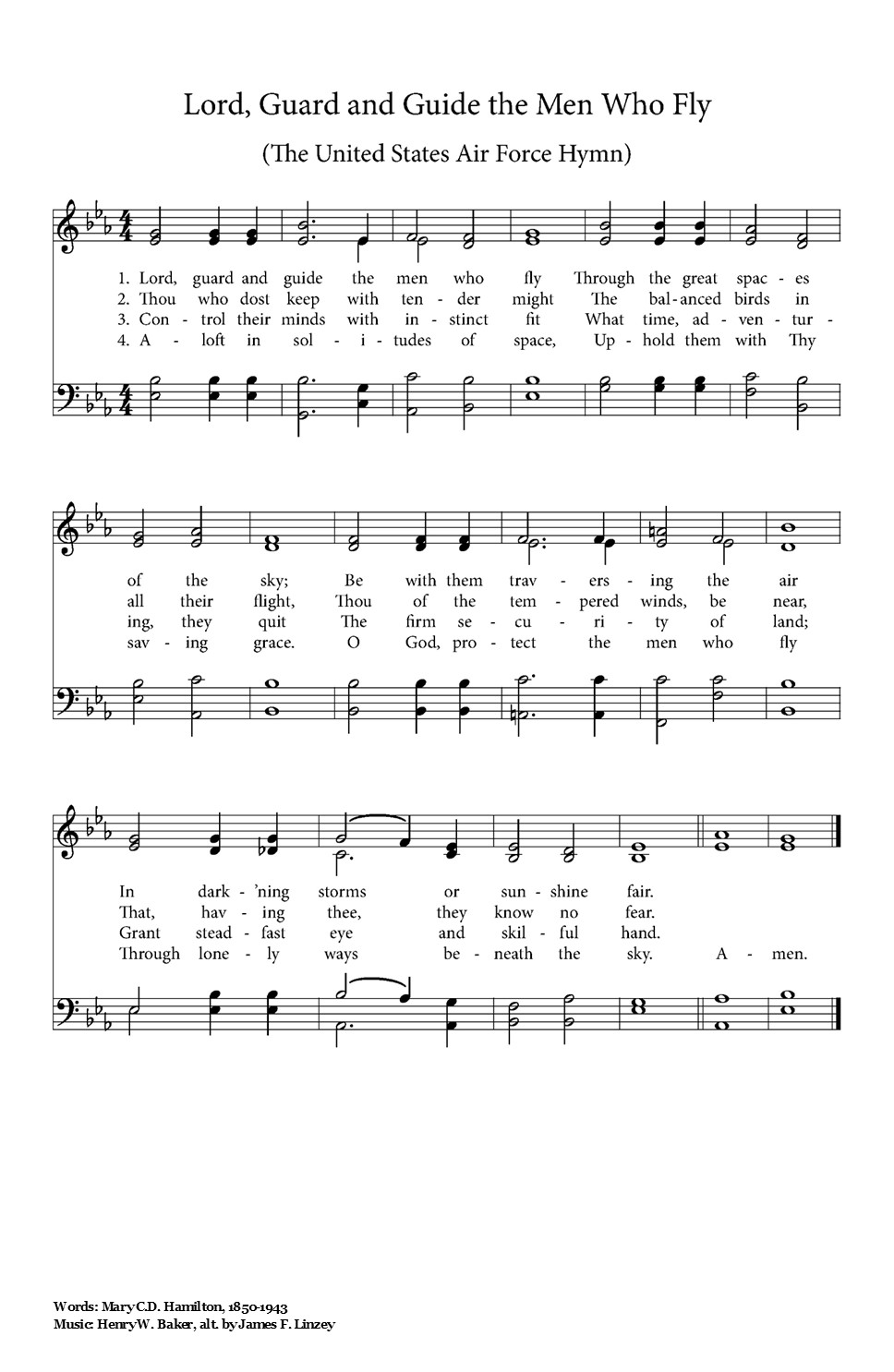
This is the United States Air Force Hymn

Mary Christian Dundas Hamilton (24 May 1850 – 10 June 1943) was a Scottish writer and poet. She is known for writing A Hymn for Aviators (1915). The music to this hymn was composed by Charles Hubert Parry. Hamilton's verse was printed in The Times of London in 1915 and was also included in the anthology A Book of Verse of the Great War by W. Reginald Wheeler, published by Yale University in 1917.

== Early life and family ==
Mary Christian Dundas Hamilton was born in Edinburgh to parents John Hamilton and Catherine Barbara Stobart. She grew up in Ayrshire and moved to Sussex, England, where she lived until her death in 1943, leaving an estate worth £5781. Hamilton had a house in Rustington, Sussex, where she was a keen fund raiser for the Women's Suffrage movement which was active in this part of the country seeing visits from Rhoda Garrett and her cousins Millicent Fawcett, Agnes Garrett and Elizabeth Garrett Anderson at various points around 1879.

== Poetry ==
Hamilton was a poet. She wrote A Hymn for Aviators in 1915, a poem that was adapted at various times and given different titles. It was known as "Lord, Guard and Guide the Men Who Fly" and also as "United States Air Force Hymn", it first appeared in the American Student Hymnal in 1928 and was set to Mozart's "Dona Nobis Pacem". This text was also used for "A Hymn for Aviators" and later when World War II began, it was adapted and used as part of "The Navy Hymn" for naval aviators.

== Works ==
- A Hymn for Aviators (1915)
