= Quantum praedecessores =

12th-century papal bull issued by Pope Eugenius III

Quantum praedecessores is a papal bull issued on 1 December 1145 by Pope Eugenius III, calling for a Second Crusade. It was the first papal bull issued with a crusade as its subject.

The bull was issued in response to the fall of Edessa, in December 1144. Pilgrims from the east had brought news of the fall of Edessa to Europe throughout 1145, and embassies from the Principality of Antioch, the Kingdom of Jerusalem, and the Kingdom of Armenia soon arrived directly at the papal court at Viterbo. The bishop Hugh of Jabala, leading one of the dioceses of Jerusalem, was among those who delivered the news.

As with most papal bulls, it had no specific title, and has come to be known by its opening words; in Latin the first sentence read "Quantum praedecessores nostri Romani pontifices pro liberatione Orientalis Ecclesiae laboraverunt, antiquorum relatione didicimus, et in gestis eorum scriptum reperimus" – in English, "How much our predecessors the Roman pontiffs did labour for the deliverance of the oriental church, we have learned from the accounts of the ancients and have found it written in their acts."

The bull, issued at Vetralla, briefly recounted the acts of the First Crusade, and lamented the loss of Edessa, one of the oldest Christian cities. The bull was addressed directly to Louis VII of France and his subjects, and promised the remission of sins for all those who took the cross, as well as ecclesiastical protection for their families and possessions, just as Pope Urban II had done before the First Crusade. Those who completed the crusade, or died along the way, were offered full absolution.

Louis was already preparing a crusade of his own, independent of Eugenius' bull, and it appears that Louis may have at first ignored the bull completely. It is possible that the embassies from the east had visited Louis as well. However, in consultation with the preacher Bernard of Clairvaux, Louis eventually sought Eugenius' blessing, and Louis' crusade enjoyed full papal support. The bull was reissued on March 1, 1146, and Bernard began to preach the crusade throughout France and later in Germany as well, where he persuaded Conrad III of Germany to participate.

Although this is the first papal bull calling for a crusade, the papacy was largely absent from the rest of the expedition. The First Crusade had no such bull – support was gathered at the Council of Clermont in 1095, and spread quickly through popular preaching. Urban II was seen as the leader of the crusade, through his legates, such as Adhemar of Le Puy. By the mid-12th century, papal power had dwindled somewhat, and Rome was controlled by the Commune of Rome. Although there were papal legates accompanying the crusade, the expedition was controlled by Louis and Conrad, not a religious leader.

The crusade was mostly destroyed during its march through Anatolia. Louis and Conrad later joined with the army of Jerusalem at the unsuccessful Siege of Damascus in 1148.

== Bibliography ==
- Ferzoco, George (1992). The Origin of the Second Crusade. In Michael Gervers (ed.), The Second Crusade and the Cistercians. New York: St. Martin's Press. ISBN 978-1-137-06864-4.
- Runciman, Steven (1952). A History of the Crusades, vol. II: The Kingdom of Jerusalem and the Frankish East, 1100-1187. Cambridge University Press.
- Setton, Kenneth (1958). A History of the Crusades, vol. I (PDF). University of Pennsylvania Press. Archived from the original (PDF) on 2021-07-09.
