= Roman Theatre of Jableh =

Ancient Roman theater in Jableh, Syria

- مسرح جبلة (Arabic)
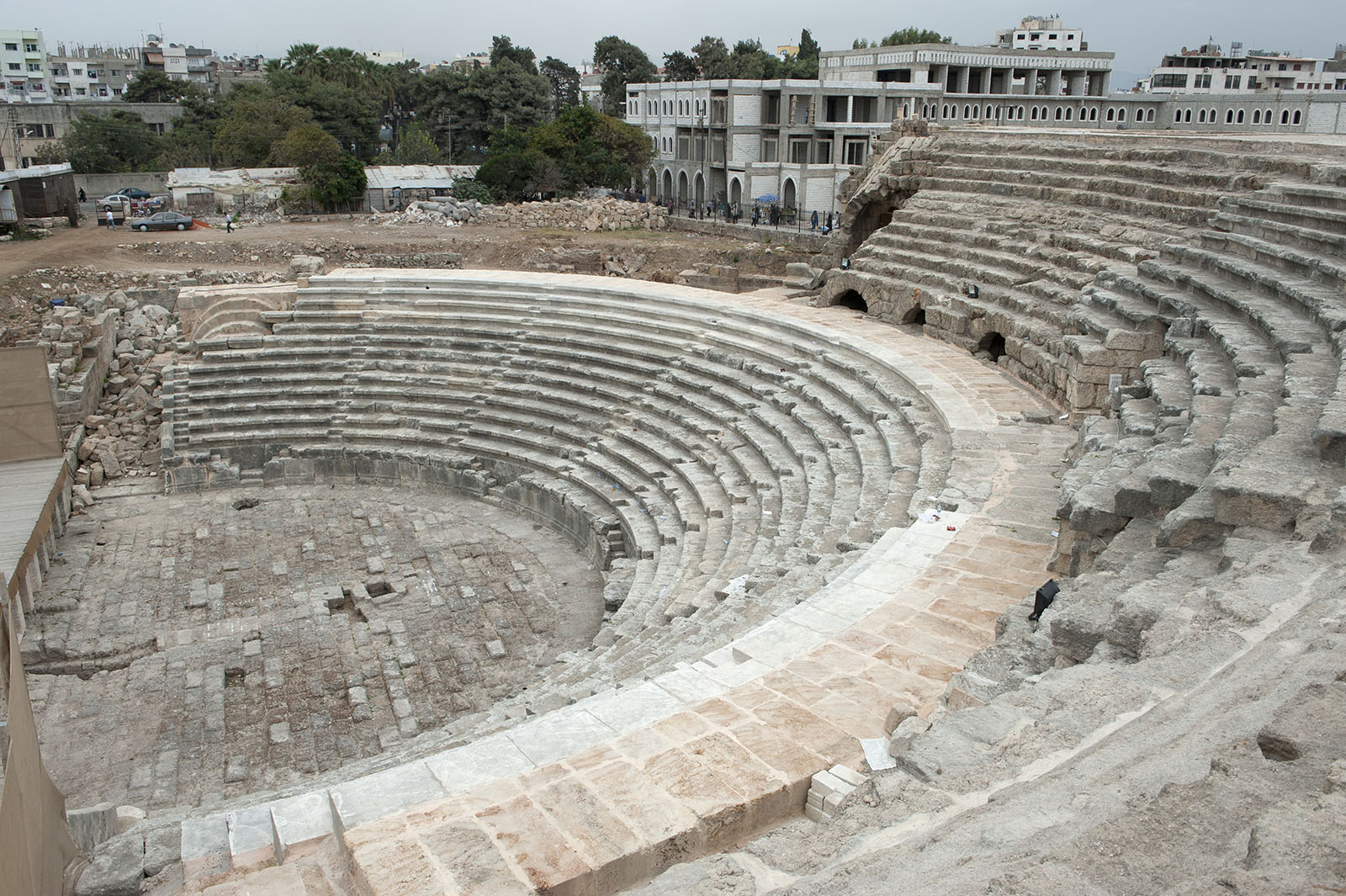
- The Roman Theatre of Jableh in 2010

- Location within Syria
- 35.362°N 35.924°E
- Location: Jableh, Syria

History
- Built: 200-250 AD

Site notes
- Elevation: 16 m (52.49 ft)
- Height: 14.84 m (48,69 ft)
- Architectural style: Ancient Roman architecture
- Governing body: Directorate-General of Antiquities and Museums
- Owner: Public

The Roman Theatre of Jableh (Arabic: مسرح جبلة, romanized: Masraḥ Jabla, lit. 'Jableh Theatre'), or the Roman Theatre of Gabala is a Roman theatre in Jableh, Syria. It was built in the early 3rd century AD, during the Severan dynasty. The current structure is owned and governed by the Directorate-General of Antiquities and Museums of Syria and it is accessible by the public.

== History ==
The Roman theatre was built in the Roman city of Gabala, Coele Syria. Some authors state that the theatre was built during the reign of Emperor Justinian (527-565 AD), while others stated that it was built under Septimius Severus (193-211 AD), recent archaeological analysis points to the latter being closer to the truth with the theatre dating to about the first half of the 3rd century AD. The structure was made from local sandstone and limestone and it could accommodate around 8,000 spectators.

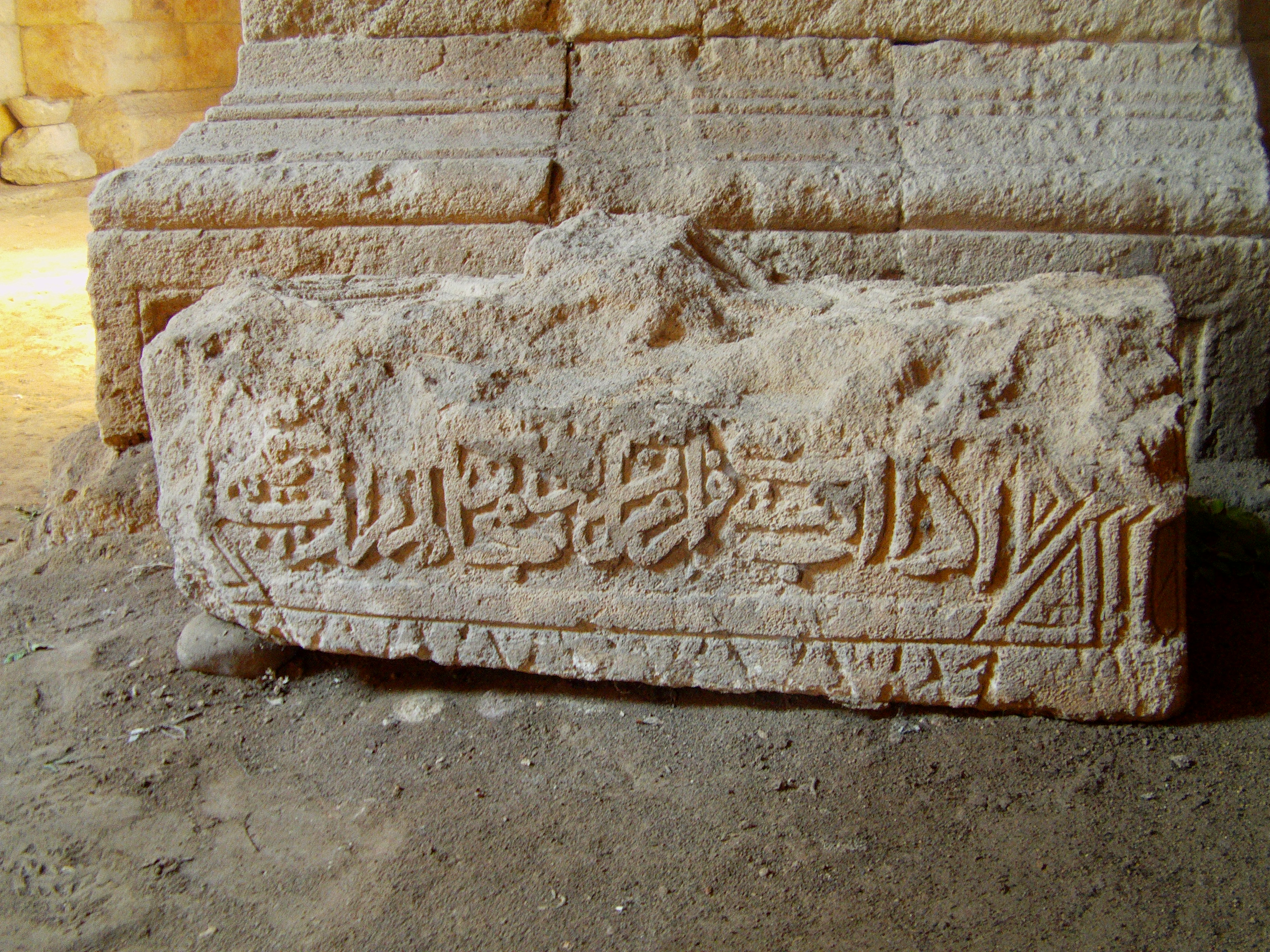
Cursive Arab-Islamic inscription found inside the theatre

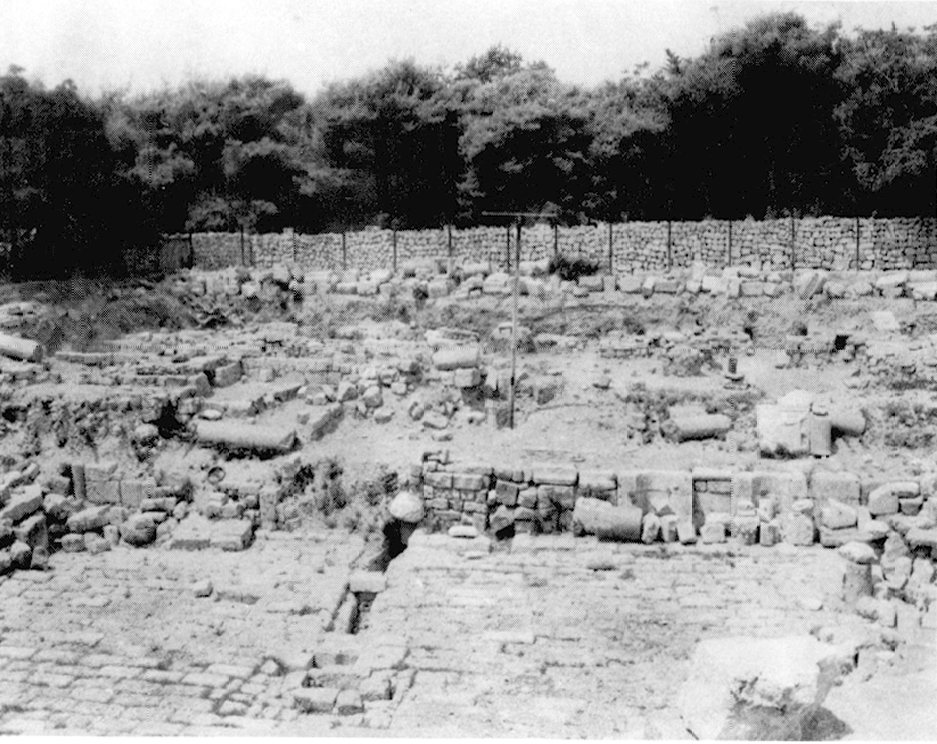
Jablé 1992, Arab-Islamic stone tombs.

The building was abandoned shortly after the Muslim conquest of Syria. Later on people started opening workshops, hammams and stables inside the theatre during the Abbasid period, furthermore multiple ceramics, glass vials, coins and other metal objects were found dating to the 8th-10th century. Between 1098 and 1285 the city was occupied by Crusaders, specifically the Principality of Antioch. The crusaders transformed the theatre into a castle, like the Bosra theatre in Southern Syria. This transformation was pointed out by various travellers, such as Yaqut al-Hamwi, who visited in 1225 and Ibn Batutta in the fourteenth century. Saladin captured the castle in 1188, but his successors subsequently abandoned it, allowing the Crusaders to return. The Mamluk Sultan Mansur Qalawun captured the castle in 1285, ending Crusader control of the city for good. The castle continued to be used into the Ottoman period, but was slowly abandoned. Excavations in 1992 discovered an Islamic cemetery above the paving of the scaenae, these included thirty stone tombs, rectangular in shape as well as various funerary furniture such as necklaces (beads), rings and bracelets.

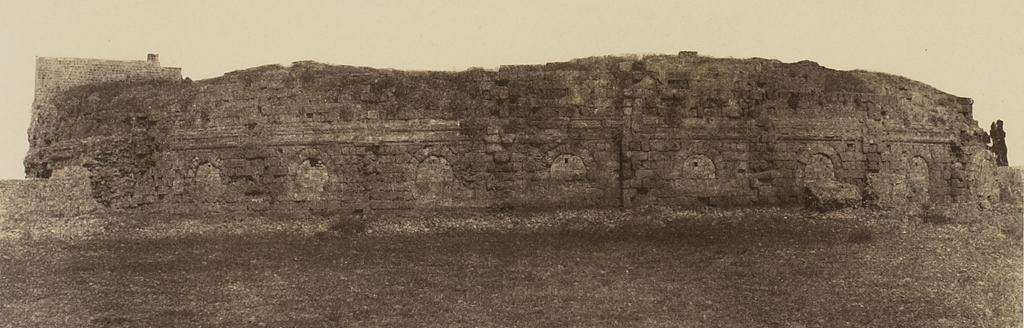
Facade of the Roman theater in a photograph from 1859, Louis de Clercq

The first documentation of the theatre in the modern Western scientific context came when Henri Mondril visited the city in 1697 during his journey from Aleppo to Jerusalem. Richard Pococke visited the city in 1745 where he drew up his plan of the theatre. Ernest Renan visited in 1860 and René Dussaud visited it in 1896. A companion of Ernest Renan stated that "It is the most beautiful Roman monument on the Phoenician coast". René Dussaud found it in ruins, possibly due to earthquakes in the region. Some of its corridors were once again used as houses, shops, warehouses and stables at this point.

The site came into the ownership of the Directorate-General of Antiquities and Museums in 1950 after the French Mandate for Syria ended. Restoration work began in 1950 and continued into the early 21st century. The theatre was mostly spared from the destruction of the Syrian Civil War and restoration work continued in 2025 after the building was damaged in the February 2023 earthquake.

== Architecture ==
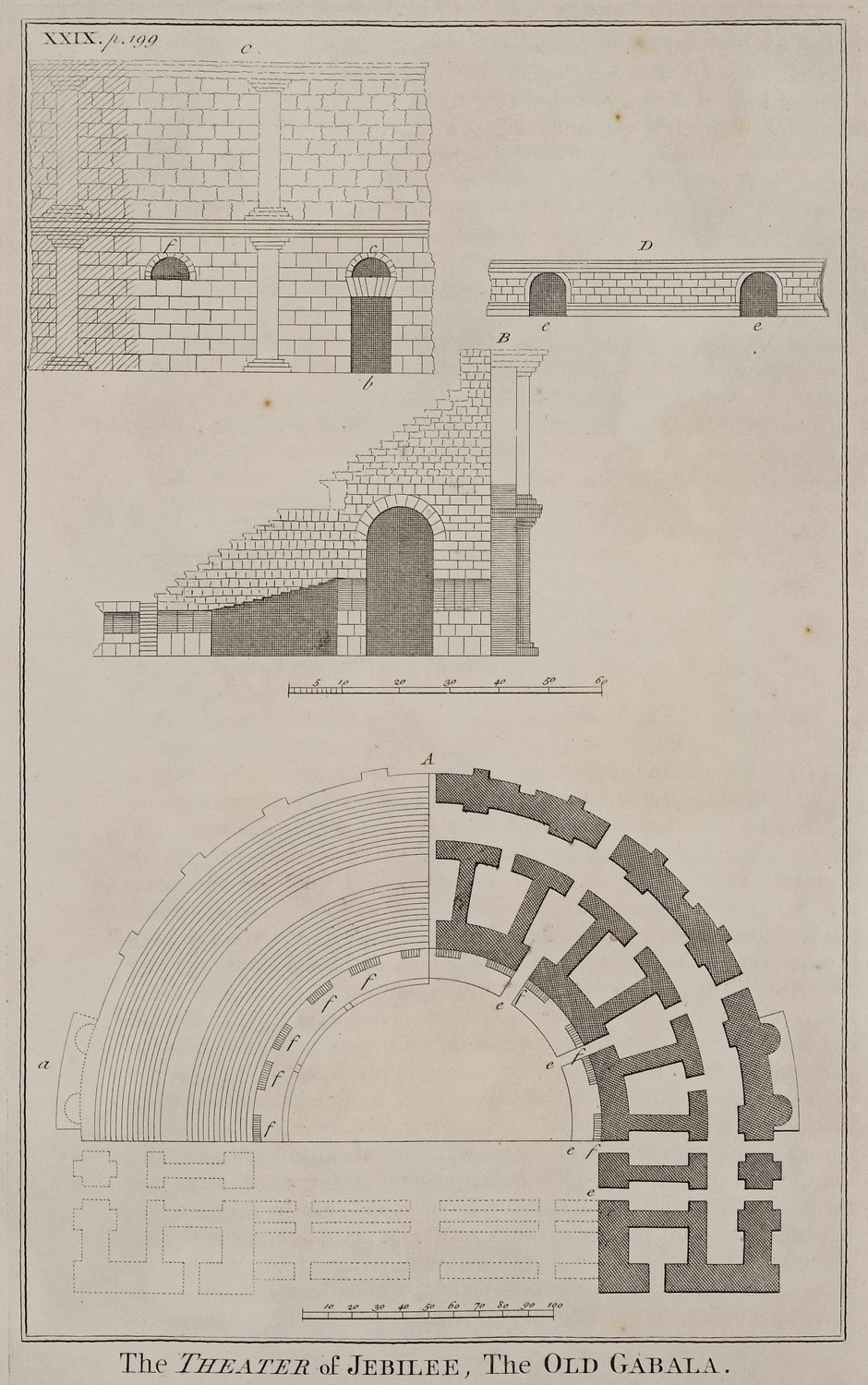
Structural drawing and layout of the Gabala theatre (Richard Pococke, 1745)

Unlike theatres built on hillside slopes, Jableh theatre was built onto a relatively flat terrain, requiring a substantial vaulting system to support the cavea. This is why the upper cavea rests on arched radial chambers and the lower part was dug into the ground. The auditorium is divided into 8 kerkides (rows) and 3 maeniana (balconies), the lower and middle tiers have 11 rows of seats, only 4 seats of the upper tier survive. There was likely a porticus in the summa cavea (highest tier) and for the lower and middle tiers there were two large arched entrances open up in the front area of the cavea. In the pavement of the orchestra floor there is a covered canal that leads from the front of the pulpitum into the middle of the stage. This could either have been a Charonian staircase (hidden staircase from underground) or an installation to flood the orchestra. Behind the stage front is the aulaeum, the canal for receiving the lowered stage curtain. Two arched entrances each lead to the orchestra and to the stage. The diameter of the entire cavea is 90 metres (300 ft) and the diameter of the orchestra is 21.5 metres (71 ft). The height of the building was 14.84 metres (48,69 ft) and the theatre could hold up an attendance of 7,000 to 8,000 people.

== Gallery ==
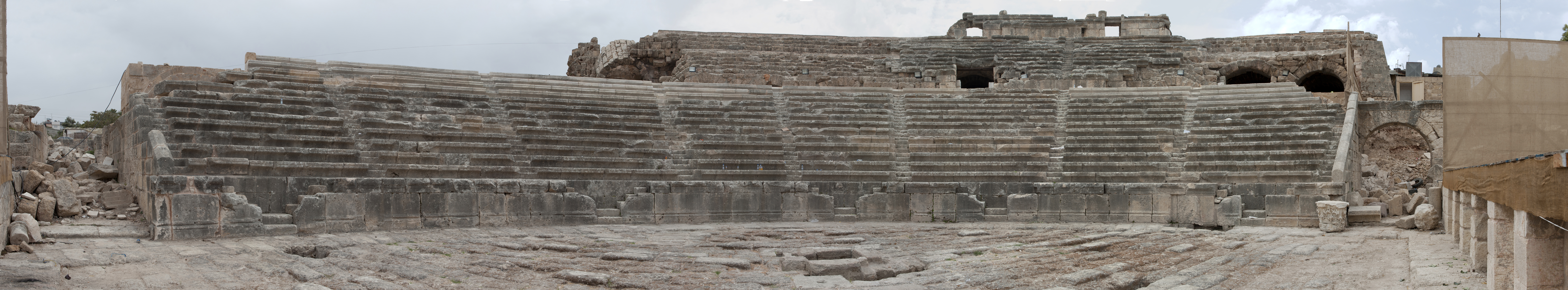
Panorama of Jableh theatre, 2010

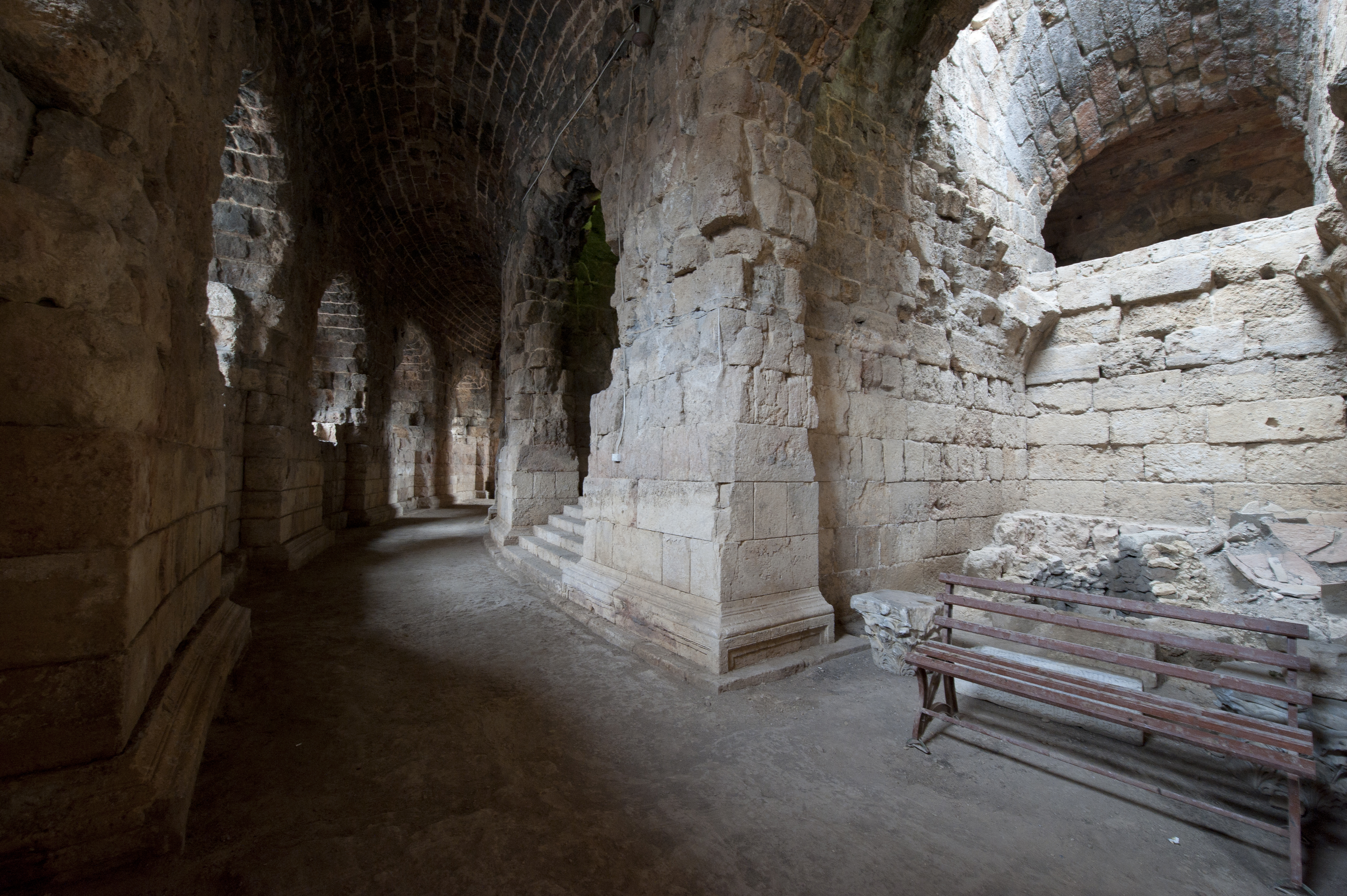
Ambulacrum of the Roman theatre

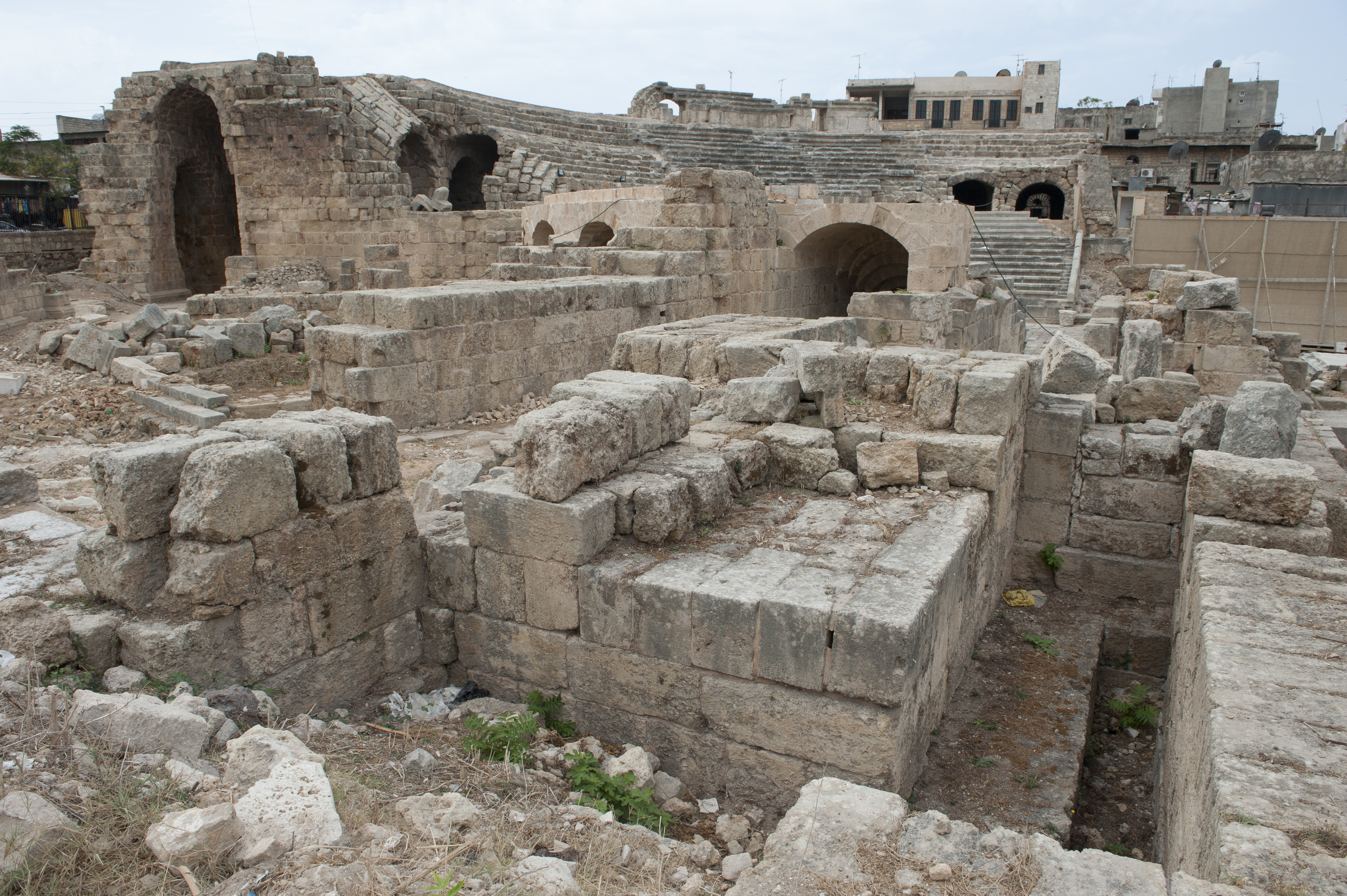
Sideview of the theatre

== See also ==
- List of Roman theatres
- List of castles in Syria
- Jableh
- Roman theatre (structure)
