= Ali Maia =

Syrian footballer (born 1986)

Ali Maia علي ميا
Personal information
- Date of birth: 6 May 1986 (age 40)
- Place of birth: Jableh, Syria
- Position: Defender

Team information
- Current team: Al-Jaish

Senior career*
| Years | Team | Apps | (Gls) |
| ?–2010 | Jableh | ? | (?) |
| 2010–2011 | Al-Nawair | | |
| 2011– | Al-Jaish | | |

International career^{‡}
| 2009 | Syria | 1 | (0) |
- * Club domestic league appearances and goals as of 8 June 2009 ‡ National team caps and goals as of 8 June 2009

Ali Maia (Arabic: علي ميا; born May 6, 1986, in Jableh, Syria) is a Syrian footballer.

== International career ==
Ali Maia is a current member of the Syria national football team. He has been a regular for the Syria national football team since 2009. Senior national coach Fajr Ibrahim called him for the first time, and he debuted on 5 June 2009 in a friendly against Sierra Leone. He came on as a substitute for Bakri Tarrab in the second halftime.

=== Appearances for Syrian national team ===
Results list Syria's goal tally first.

| # | Category | Date | Venue | Opponent | Appearances | | Goals | Result | # | Competition |
| # | Category | Date | Venue | Opponent | Start | Sub | Goals | Result | # | Competition |
|---|---|---|---|---|---|---|---|---|---|---|
| 1. | Senior | 05 Jun 2009 | Abbasiyyin Stadium, Damascus, Syria | Sierra Leone | 0 | 1 | 0 | 6-0 | W | International Friendly^{1} |

W = Matches won; D = Matches drawn; L = Matches lost

^{1} Non FIFA 'A' international match
