= Yon =

Yon may refer to:

- Yon (name), including a list of people with the name
- Yon (river), France
- Yon Mound and Village Site, a prehistoric archaeological site in Florida
- Yön ("Direction" in English), a Turkish weekly leftist political magazine published between 1961 and 1967
- Yarragon railway station, Australia
- Yongphulla Airport (IATA code), Bhutan
- Yonggom language (ISO 639-3 code) of West Papua and Papua New Guinea
- Fuel oil barge, non-self propelled (YON)
