= Mosque of Sultan Ibrahim Ibn Adham =

Mosque in Latakia Governorate, Syria

Mosque of Sultan Ibrahim ibn Adham
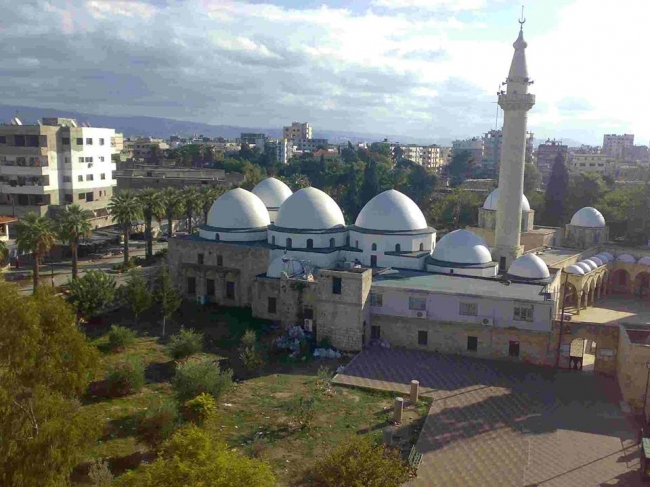
- The mosque in 2015

- Location of the mosque in Syria

Religion
- Affiliation: Sunni Islam
- Ecclesiastical or organisational status: Mosque and mausoleum/shrine
- Status: Active

Location
- Location: Jableh, Latakia Governorate
- Country: Syria
- Interactive map of Mosque of Sultan Ibrahim ibn Adham
- Coordinates: 35°21′46″N 35°55′27″E

Architecture
- Type: Islamic architecture
- Style: Seljuk; Mamluk; Ottoman
- Completed: c. 785 CE

Specifications
- Dome: 8
- Minaret: 1
- Shrine: 1: (Ibrahim ibn Adham)

The Mosque of Sultan Ibrahim ibn Adham is a Sunni mosque and mausoleum, located in the city of Jableh, in the Latakia Governorate of Syria. The mosque dates from the Seljuk era and was subsequently improved by the Mamluks and Ottomans, the latter two whose contributions are still present predominantly in the modern building. The mosque was named after Ibrahim ibn Adham, an 8th-century Sufi mystic and Islamic scholar, who is said to be buried in the mosque's shrine.

== History ==
Ibrahim ibn Adham died in a naval campaign against the Byzantines, and was buried in a fort on a Roman island. It alleged that the location of the fort was in the present-day is the city of Jableh, in the Latakia Governorate on the Syrian coast. Originally at the site of the present building there was a church; however, it was demolished. The alleged first structure built over the grave of Ibrahim ibn Adham was a shrine, completed by the Seljuks as a token of respect for Ibrahim ibn Adham – a Sufi saint. During the Mamluk rule, a mosque was built and attached to the shrine along with a minaret. A fountain and gate was also added to the structure. The current prayer hall of the mosque was completed during this era. Later during Ottoman rule over Syria, the domes of the mosque were built and the minaret was renovated.

== Architecture ==
The mosque has three perpendicular entrances; a northern entrance that leads directly to the open courtyard, a southern entrance that leads to the shrine, and an eastern entrance that leads to a row of warehouses. The eastern entrance also leads to a more modern part of the building. The mosque complex consists of three main features; the prayer hall, the courtyard, and the shrine room.

The prayer hall, dating from the Mamluk era, is mainly entered from the western side is open to the open courtyard. The walls are 116.5 centimetres (45.9 in) thick. The windows on the sides of the prayer hall are identical in dimensions and descriptions, with a width of 120 centimetres (47 in) and a height of 200 centimetres (79 in), each rectangular with two wooden shutters on the inner side. The qibla of the mosque is on the southern side of the prayer hall, and the mihrab and minbar are present there. The minbar is built of old white-gray marble, and it has a small wooden door at its front with two doors engraved with marble decorations.

The shrine room is squarish in shape, with walls of at least 8 metres (26 ft) in base length. The walls are surmounted by an arched dome made of Syrian sandstone. The dome sits on an octagonal base. On its southern wall, there are two identical rectangular openings with two main wooden shutters, between them is an old semicircular mihrab. It is surmounted by a pointed arch, and next to it are two columns, each with a simple muqarnas capital and a square base above the mihrab. The grave of Ibrahim ibn Adham is located at the center of the room.

There is a hammam attached to the mosque complex. The floor of the hammam is paved with fine marble.

== Other burial places attributed to Ibrahim ibn Adham ==
There is a small shrine located in the city of Sur in Oman which is alleged to entomb the remains of Ibrahim ibn Adham. However, this does not match with the tradition in Islamic history that Ibrahim ibn Adham was buried on an island which was under Byzantine Roman control.

== Gallery ==
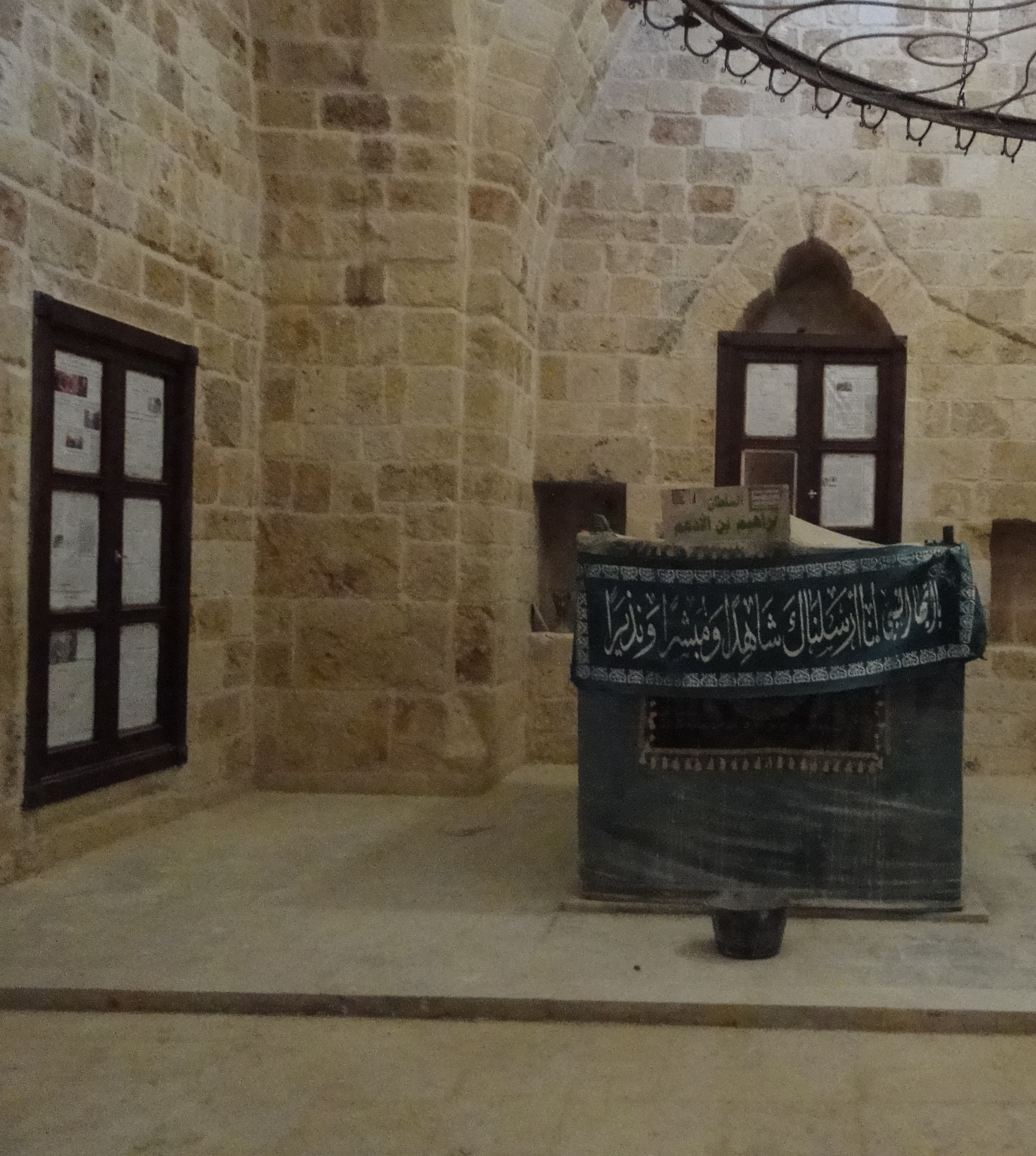
Tomb of Ibrahim ibn Adham inside the mosque

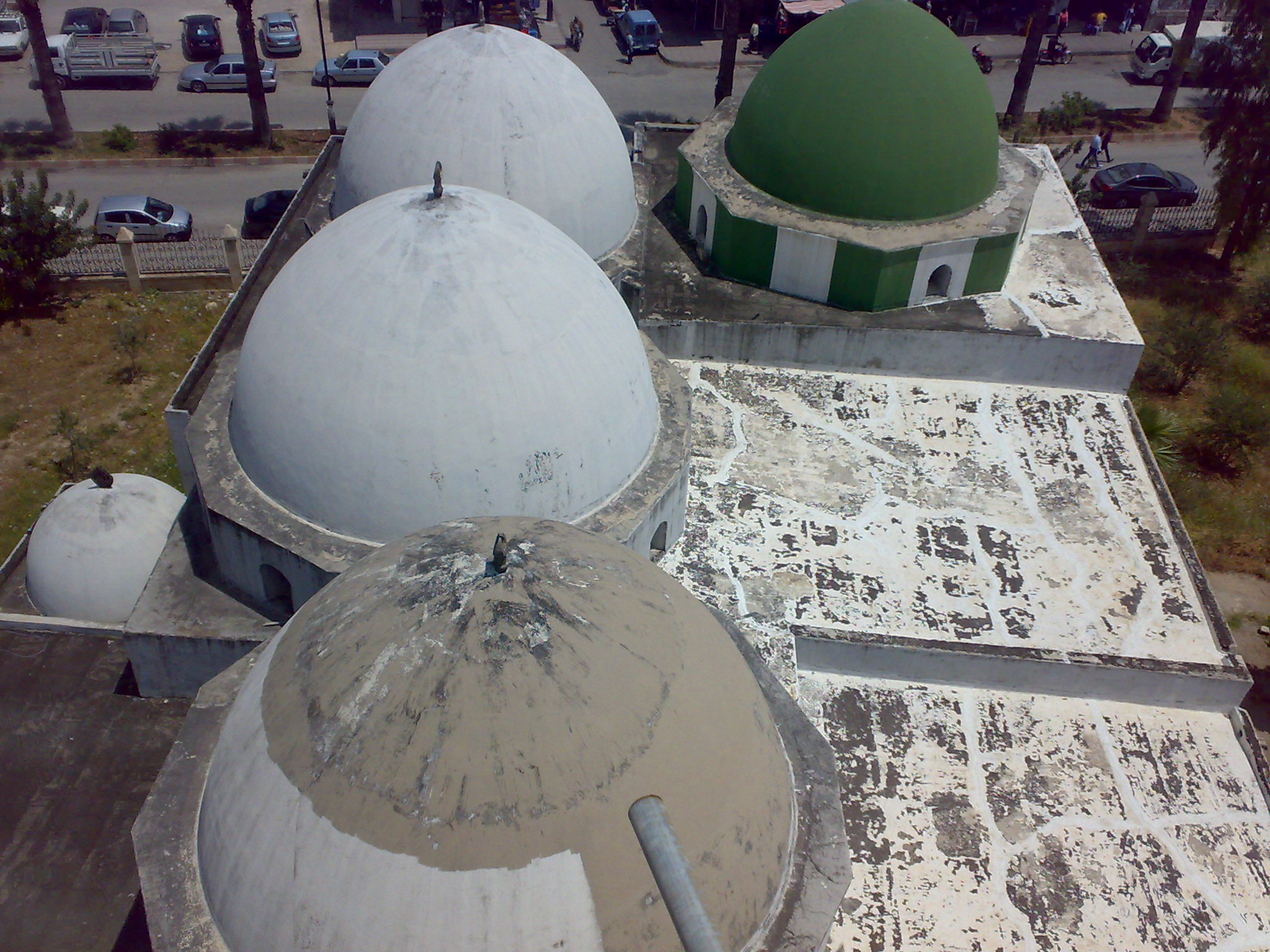
Close-up of the domes of the mosque

== See also ==
- Sunni Islam in Syria
- List of mosques in Syria
