= Daniel Sénélar =

French painter (1925–2001)

- Born: 24 June 1925; Paris, France
- Died: 15 March 2001 (aged 75); Paris, France
- Education: Nicolas Untersteller
- Known for: Painting, drawing
- Notable work: Le Cheval compagnon de l'Homme Grand prix de Rome
- Movement: Cubism
- Spouse: Mara Rumbold

Daniel Sénélar (born 24 June 1925 in Paris; died 15 March 2001 in Paris) was a French painter.

== Biography ==
Presented by Nicolas Untersteller (1900–1967) at the École nationale supérieure des beaux-arts in Paris on 30 October 1947. He first worked under the supervision of Nicolas Untersteller and later under Maurice Brianchon (1899–1979) in 1949.

In 1951 he received the Grand Prix de Rome. He took up residence from 1952 till 1955 at the Villa Medici. under the direction of Jacques Ibert. He became professor at the École des Beaux-Arts in Lille in 1967, a post he held for thirty years.

== Works ==
His extensive work includes drawings, paintings and graphics. One of his most famous works is the painting "The Horse, Companion of Man" (1951), for which he received the Prix de Rome 1951.

Daniel Sénélar has participated in the restoration works of the Palace of Versailles.

- 1950 – Figure peinte (Painted figure)
- 1950 – Entraînement des chevaux de course en hiver (Training of the race horses in winter);
- 1951 – Le Cheval compagnon de l'homme (The Horse, Companion of Man)
- Fresco at the "Bibliothèque Municipale de Neuilly", now House of Youth at the Place Parmentier in Neuilly
- 1952 – Joueurs de cartes dans un salon ou un café (card player in a tearoom or cafe)
- 1955 – Le poisson (The Fish), private ownership.

== Exhibitions ==
- 1977 – Picasso Museum at Antibes: the 50 last Grands Prix de Rome

== Museums ==
- École nationale supérieure des beaux-arts 4 Works.
- Villa Medici in Rome

== Awards ==
- 1950 – Award Albéric Rocheron; First prize and Medal.
- 1951 – Grand Prix de Rome 1951 for Le cheval compagnon de l'homme.
- 1952 – Fortin d'Ivry Award.

== Students ==
- Anne Lambert from 1963 to 1968
- Sonia Tamer
- Nathalie Troxler
- Richard-Viktor Sainsily Cayol
- Maria Dubin
- Hugues Absil in 1990
- Marc Anderson (aka André Ronsmac from 1982 to 1989)

== Literature ==
- Vladimir Velickovic, Daniel Sénélar. Preamble from François Wehrlin: Beaux-Arts 84. École nationale supérieure des Beaux-Arts (Chapelle des Petits Augustins) Paris 1984. ISBN 2-90363927-2.
