= Rustington =

Village and parish in West Sussex, England

Coordinates: 50.81019°N 0.50521°W

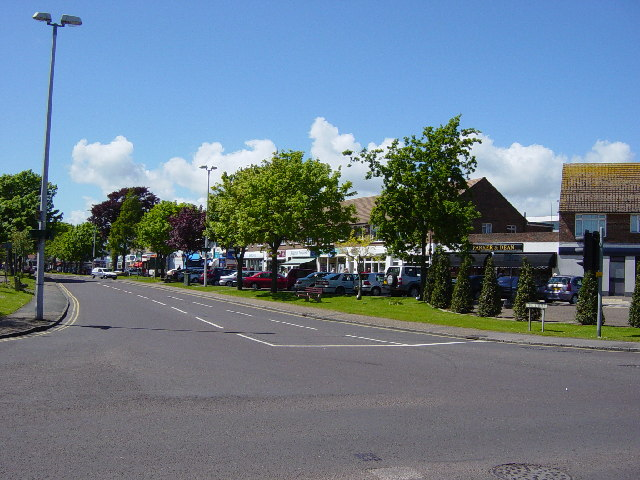
- View of the main highstreet

- Location within West Sussex
- Area: 3.72 km^{2} (1.44 sq mi)
- Population: 13,883 (Civil Parish.2011)
  - Density: 3,732/km^{2} (9,670/sq mi)
- OS grid reference: TQ054022
  - London: 51 miles (82 km) NNE
- Civil parish: Rustington
- District: Arun
- Shire county: West Sussex
- Region: South East
- Country: England
- Sovereign state: United Kingdom
- Post town: LITTLEHAMPTON
- Postcode district: BN16
- Dialling code: 01903
- Police: Sussex
- Fire: West Sussex
- Ambulance: South East Coast
- UK Parliament: Bognor Regis and Littlehampton
- Website: Rustington Parish Council

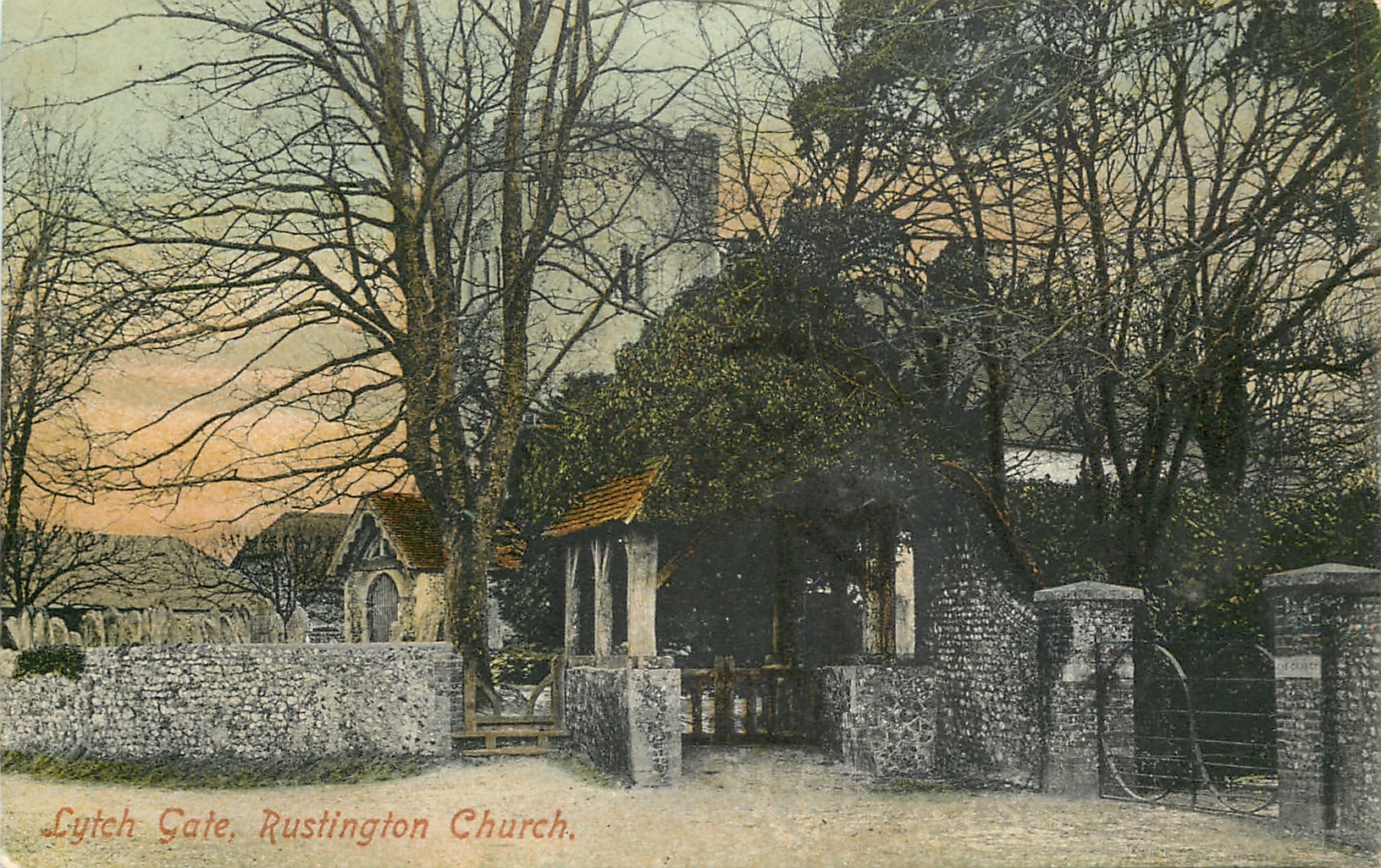
Lych Gate, Rustington Church, John White postcard, sent 1905

Rustington is a village and civil parish in the Arun District of West Sussex. Rustington is approximately at the midpoint of the West Sussex coast and midway between Chichester and Brighton. The A259 runs along the north of Rustington, westward to Littlehampton, Bognor Regis and Chichester, and east to Worthing and Brighton. The area forms part of the Brighton and Hove built-up area.

== History ==
In World War I, Rustington was home to a planned American aerodrome, to the east of the High Street. Intended to launch bombing raids against Germany, the airfield was incomplete when the war ended.

== Conservation area and information centre ==
Rustington contains a Conservation Area which extends from the south end of North Lane to The Lamb in The Street. Here, where trees are protected, are the largest number of pre-1850 listed buildings in the post town, with The Street and surrounding roads containing some of the finest 17th and 18th century Sussex flint cottages in West Sussex, some of which are thatched.

There is a village information centre at the Broadmark Lane car park, housed in the recently renovated WRVS building in the Waitrose car park. It also houses Rustington Museum, exploring the village's history from the Stone Age to the modern day with artefacts from throughout time.

== Geography ==
Rustington adjoins the English Channel, and is up to 7 metres (23 ft) above Ordnance Datum. It has three main recreation grounds and neither woodland nor fields.

== In music, literature and the media ==
"Rustington" is a well-known hymn tune by Hubert Parry, who lived and died in Rustington.

Rustington achieved national fame in 1956 with the launch of Flanders and Swann's show At the Drop of a Hat, in which "The Gnu Song" contains the lines:

I had taken furnished lodgings down at Rustington-on-Sea
Whence I travelled on to Ashton-Under-Lyne...

== Transport ==
Rustington shares Angmering railway station with Angmering and East Preston. Trains from this station go to Brighton and Portsmouth/Southampton, as well as regular services to London.

Bus services to Brighton and Portsmouth are provided by the Coastliner 700 with many stops within the village itself.

== In the news ==
=== Hot cross bun ===
- Paul Pegrum, of Pegrum's bakery (now Forfar's), created the world's biggest hot cross bun to publicise Rustington at Easter 2002. After four hours of cooking, the bun surpassed two out of the three existing records. A weights and measures inspector from Brighton and Hove Council found the bun had smashed the current weight record of 38 kg (84 lb), weighing in at 42.8 kg (94.4 lb). It is also the widest, with a diameter of 4 ft 4 in (132 cm).

=== Air speed records ===
Two world air speed records were set over Rustington sea front.

1. Set on 7 September 1946, by Group Captain Teddy Donaldson, flying a Gloster Meteor. Donaldson also became the first man to exceed 1000 km/h.
2. Set on 7 September 1953, by Squadron Leader Neville Duke, flying Hawker Hunter WB188, at a speed of 1170.9 km/h.

To celebrate, on 7 September 1996, Neville Duke returned to Rustington to unveil a plaque, marking the event, joined by a Gloster Meteor and a Hawker Hunter, which flew over the sea front.

== Notable people ==
- Lindsay Anderson, Indian-born English feature film, theatre and documentary director, film critic, and leading light of the Free Cinema movement and the British New Wave. He wrote If.... while living in his mother's house on the village's Sea Estate.
- J M Barrie, Scottish author and dramatist; a friend of the Llewellyn Davies family who had a house in Rustington and were the inspiration of his book Peter Pan.
- Eddie Blair, Scottish jazz trumpeter, died in Rustington.
- Delirious?, English Christian rock and worship band members lived in the village.
- Huw Edwards-Jones, cabinetmaker and five-time Guild Mark recipient, was born in Rustington.
- Agnes Garrett (who, with her cousin Rhoda Garrett opened the first interior design company in Britain to be run by women) had a house in Rustington. Agnes's sister Millicent Garrett Fawcett (suffragist leader) also stayed there. Another sister, Elizabeth Garrett Anderson (first woman to qualify as a doctor), also visited.
- Mary Christian Dundas Hamilton, poet, known for writing A Hymn for Aviators (1915). The music was composed by Sir Hubert Parry.
- Nigel Hitchcock, saxophonist
- Stanley Holloway, English actor, comedian, singer and monologist who lived next to the sea at East Preston.
- Sir Geoffrey Jellicoe, landscape architect, garden designer, architect and author, raised in Rustington.
- Norman Newell, record producer and lyricist.
- Sir Hubert Parry, composer of hymn melodies, some becoming templates, including '"Rustington". He lived in Sea Lane (from 1880-d.1918).
- Andrew Pearson, cricketer who played for Bedfordshire.
- Ed Petrie, British comedian, actor and television presenter. He was born and raised in the village.
- George Posford, English composer, most notably famed for "Good Night Vienna"
- Graham Sutherland, English artist
- Mitchell Symons, journalist and bestselling author. He has lived just outside the village since 1995.
- Ben Thatcher, drummer of the popular British rock duo Royal Blood.
- Brian White, cartoonist. He spent much of his later life in the village.
- Leslie Arthur Wilcox, marine artist. He lived in Cove Road from 1963 to 1982.

== Freedom of the Parish ==
The following people and military units have received the Freedom of the Parish of Rustington.

=== Individuals ===
- Graham Tyler: 5 October 2024.

== Twin towns ==
- Los Altos, United States
- Künzell, Germany
