= Jableh =

Town in Latakia Governorate, Syria

Jableh جَبْلَةٌ Gabala
- City
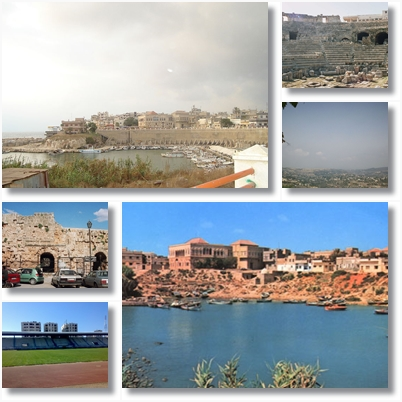
- General view of city and port • Roman Amphitheater • Jableh Stadium • Entrance of Roman Theater • Landscape of Jableh • Port
- Nickname: Mount of the Soul (Arabic: جَبْلَة ٱلرّوح)
- Location in Syria Jableh (Eastern Mediterranean) Jableh (Asia)
- Coordinates: 35°21′N 35°55′E
- Country: Syria
- Governorate: Latakia Governorate
- District: Jableh District
- Subdistrict: Jableh Subdistrict
- Control: Syrian transitional government
- Elevation: 16 m (52 ft)

Population (2004 census)
  - Total: 80,000
- Demonym(s): Arabic: جَبْلَاوِي, romanized: Jablawi
- Time zone: UTC+2 (EET)
  - Summer (DST): UTC+3 (EEST)
- Area codes: Country code: 963; City code: 41
- Geocode: C3585
- Climate: Csa

Jableh (Arabic: جَبْلَةٌ; Ǧabla, also spelt Jebleh, Jabala, Jablah, Gabala or Gibellum) is a Mediterranean coastal city in Syria, 25 km (16 mi) north of Baniyas and 25 km (16 mi) south of Latakia, with c. 80,000 inhabitants (2004 census). As Ancient Gabala, it was a Byzantine archbishopric and remains a Latin Catholic titular see. It contains the tomb and Mosque of Ibrahim ibn Adham, a legendary Sufi mystic who renounced his throne of Balkh and devoted himself to prayers for the rest of his life.

== History ==
=== Late Bronze Age ===
==== Kingdom of Ugarit ====
Less than 1 kilometre (0.62 miles) from the city center lies the ancient site of Gibala, today known as Tell Tweini. This city was inhabited from the second millennium BCE until the Late Bronze Age collapse. The city was part of the Ugaritic kingdom and was mentioned as "Gbʿly" in the archives of the city c. 1200 BC.

Ugarit was a vassal of the Hittite Empire from around 1350 to 1190 BC, when the Hittite Empire collapsed.

=== Iron Age ===
After the Bronze Age collapse, the geomorphological situation of the estuary on which Tell Tweini lay changed and the water receded. This led to the abandonment of the Tell Tweini site for habitation and the moving of the city towards the coast, where the current vieille ville (old town) of Jableh lies. The vieille ville had already become the center of the city and Tell Tweini was completely abandoned by the time of the Persian conquests and the Achaemenid Empire and continued to do so until the Late Iron Age. Remains were found near the seashore dating to the Iron Age or Phoenician Era.

=== Classical Age ===
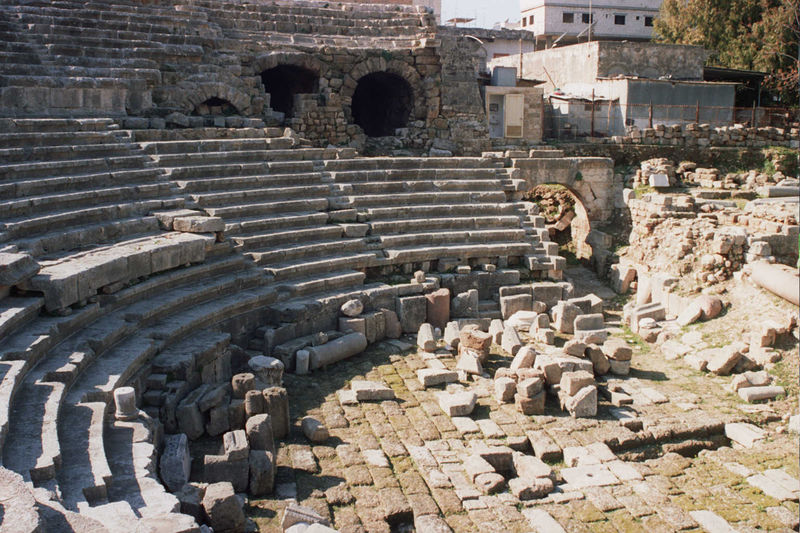
The Roman theatre

Map of archaeological and historic sites in Jableh

In antiquity, Jableh (then called Gabala) was an important Hellenistic and then Roman city. One of the main remains of this period is the Roman Theatre of Jableh, capable of housing c. 7,000 spectators and having a diameter of 90 m. Furthermore eight tombs were found at the al-Jbeibat necropolis 500 metres (0.31 mi) northwest of the theatre. These tombs were dated to the Hellenistic and Roman periods (2nd century BC - 4th century AD) and were the tombs of the lower classes during both periods. The tombs were family tombs and were often re-used. They contained ceramics, glasswares, necklaces, coins and jewellery. The bodies of the entombed were often placed inside wooden coffins or terracotta sarcophagi in contrast to the more richly decorated graves in Palmyra. A red-brownish carnelian Moabite seal was found in tomb B dating to the 7th century BCE during excavations. It depicts multiple symbols such as a seven-pointed star (Astarte), a crescent moon (moon-god) and other unknown symbols. There is a Moabite inscription in the center which reads "lmks" or "to belong to my (god) Kamosh". The excavations also recovered an Achaemenid-era figurine dating to the 5th century BCE, possibly depicting Astarte. Although it isn't fully understood how this Hellenistic tomb contained relics dating back hundreds of years to Moab, it's thought that these were of more sentimental or emotional value to the Greeks rather than religious or cultural. Also noting that the Greeks probably knew how old and valuable these items were, thus leading them to be used in the Greek burial rituals.

=== Middle Ages ===
The Jableh region was incorporated into the Islamic Empire with the conquest of Syria in 637–642. Between approximately 969 and 1081, however, much of the region returned under the control of the Byzantine Empire, until it was captured by Banu Ammar. The Alawites began spreading in the area in the early eleventh century.

In the medieval period, Jableh, then called Gibellum, was conquered by Tancred and the Genoese on 23 July 1109, to be part of the Principality of Antioch, one of the Crusader States. In 1126, the cities of Latakia and Jabala were the dowry of Princess Alice, daughter of King Baldwin II of Jerusalem. It was captured by Saladin in 1189 during the Third Crusade. One famous resident was Hugh of Jabala, the city's bishop, who reported the fall of Edessa to Pope Eugene III and was the first person to speak of Prester John.

During the Mamluk period, there was still an "Ayyubid" mosque in the city that had probably been founded by members of Saladin's entourage or army. In 1318, a revolt by the Alawites from the surrounding highlands resulted in an attack on Jableh before a Mamluk column sent from Tripoli was able to retake control. The famous Moroccan traveler Ibn Battuta visited Jableh in 1326. Construction of the current Mosque of Sultan Ibrahim ibn Adham began in the Mamluk period, with the mosque and minaret being attached to the Seljuk period shrine of Ibrahim ibn Adham. The construction of the domes were completed in the Ottoman period.

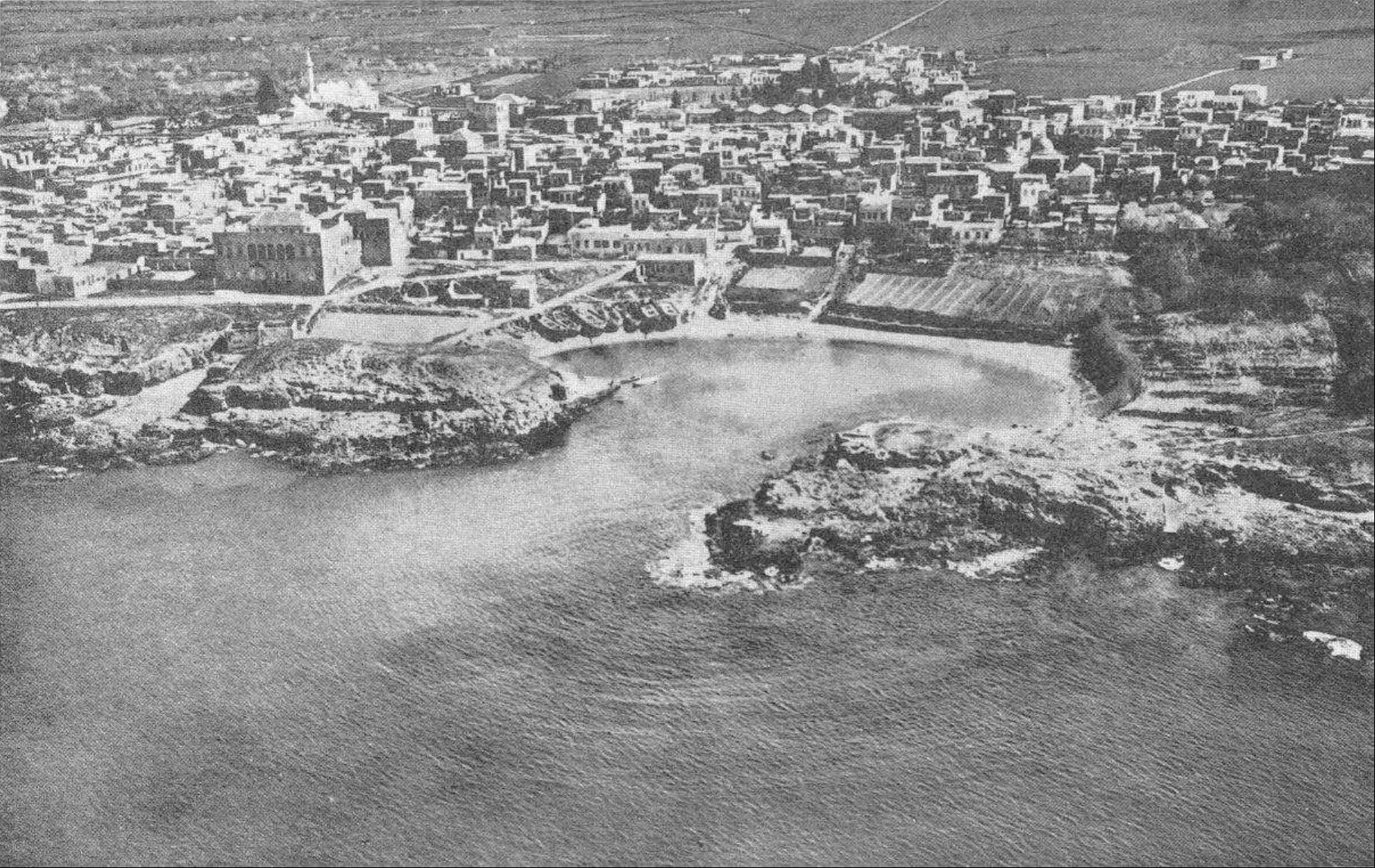
The harbor of Jableh in 1939 (view towards the east)

In the Ottoman period (1516–1918), Jabala originally formed a sub-province (sancak) of the province of Tripoli before it was made its own sancak in 1547–1548. The district (nahiye) of Jabala comprised approximately 80 villages in addition to Jableh itself, the majority of which were inhabited by Alawites. In 1564, the province of Jableh was governed by the son of Janbulad ibn Qasim al-Kurdi, the sancak-beyi of Kilis. The city of Jableh gained special importance with the Ottoman conquest of Cyprus, which lies just 120 km directly offshore, in 1570. The governor and the qadi (judge) of Jableh received numerous orders from the Ottoman government to guard the area against Mediterranean pirates and rebel Alawites in the next decades. The city and the province of Jableh became less important as Latakia rose in importance in the eighteenth century. At the end of the nineteenth century, the province of Jableh was divided into twenty new nahiyes.

=== Modern Age ===
On May 23, 2016, the Islamic State claimed responsibility for four suicide bombings in Jableh, which had remained largely unaffected since the Syrian Civil War began in 2011. Purportedly targeting Alawite gatherings, the bombs killed over a hundred people. In Tartus, similarly insulated, another three bombers killed 48 people.

In February 2023, a magnitude 7.8 earthquake struck Turkey and western Syria. It caused widespread destruction and fatalities. In Jableh, at least 283 people died, 173 were injured and 19 buildings collapsed.

On 8 December 2024, the Syrian opposition took control of Jableh.

== Demographics ==
According to the 2004 census, the city of Jableh had a population of 80,000 inhabitants, furthermore the Jableh subdistrict had a population of 107,064 inhabitants. A 2012 estimate gives the population of the city to be 75,505 inhabitants, but this number should be treated with caution, because it is not a Syrian census figure. A 2009 estimate by Al Jazeera reports approximately 160,000 inhabitants for Jableh. The Jableh city council began a yet unfinished population survey in 2025.

Jableh is described as an unusually Sunni majority city in a predominantly Alawite region. Al Jazeera describes Sunni Muslims as historically the majority Jableh, while noting the recent substantial Alawite migration into the city. Alawites currently constitute close to half of the city's population. An oral-historical estimation gives the population of Sunnis in the city to be around 35,000-40,000 inhabitants, with the rest belonging to other groups.

Historically, the city had been more Sunni than it is now. A scholarly demographic table in 1935 gives the percentage of Sunnis in the city to be around 96.8%, and by 1945 it was still about 90,1%.

== Economy ==
The majority of people in Jableh depend on agriculture for their income, people grow orange and lemon trees, olives, a large number of green houses for vegetables can be found in the country side. In the center of the city people work in trade and there are small factories in the city for cottons and for making orange juice, whilst most residents solely depend on retirement allowance, although Jableh's economy suffers due to barely any electricity times between neighborhoods, which affects water availability in the city.

== Sports ==
Jableh Sporting Club is a football club based in Jableh, playing in the Jableh Stadium, which has a seating capacity of 10,000.

== People ==
- Adunis, a Syrian pioneer of modern Arabic poetry.
- Hugh of Jabala, 12th-century bishop of Jableh
- Arslan Matarci Pasha, served as wali of Damascus Eyalet, Sidon Eyalet, and Tripoli Eyalet in the 18th and 19th centuries.
- Izz ad-Din al-Qassam, Syrian Muslim preacher and a leader in the local struggles against British and French Mandatory rule in the Levant and an opponent of Zionism in the 1920s and 1930s and the namesake of the Izz ad-Din al-Qassam Brigades, the military wing of Hamas.
- The Boustani family.
- Mohammad Zeitoun, a swimming champion whose story is featured in Zeitoun.
- Ali Maia, footballer
- Dr. Fayez Attaf, general surgeon who was known as 'The Poor People's Surgeon' in Jableh. He regularly paid the cost of operations of displaced and poor patients. He and his wife, neurologist Dr. Hala Saiid died in the February 2023 earthquake.
- Loubna Mrie, a Syrian activist, photographer and author.

== Climate ==
Jableh has a hot-summer Mediterranean climate (Köppen climate classification Csa).

Climate data for Jableh
Month	Jan	Feb	Mar	Apr	May	Jun	Jul	Aug	Sep	Oct	Nov	Dec	Year
Mean daily maximum °C (°F)	12.8 (55.0)	14.0 (57.2)	17.7 (63.9)	21.4 (70.5)	25.0 (77.0)	28.3 (82.9)	30.0 (86.0)	28.8 (83.8)	27.6 (81.7)	26.5 (79.7)	21.5 (70.7)	15.5 (59.9)	22.4 (72.4)
Daily mean °C (°F)	10.1 (50.2)	10.9 (51.6)	13.8 (56.8)	16.9 (62.4)	20.3 (68.5)	23.9 (75.0)	26.1 (79.0)	25.6 (78.1)	23.7 (74.7)	21.6 (70.9)	16.9 (62.4)	12.2 (54.0)	18.5 (65.3)
Mean daily minimum °C (°F)	7.3 (45.1)	7.8 (46.0)	9.9 (49.8)	12.4 (54.3)	15.5 (59.9)	19.4 (66.9)	22.2 (72.0)	22.3 (72.1)	19.8 (67.6)	16.7 (62.1)	12.3 (54.1)	8.9 (48.0)	14.5 (58.2)
Average precipitation mm (inches)	159 (6.3)	130 (5.1)	109 (4.3)	50 (2.0)	28 (1.1)	4 (0.2)	1 (0.0)	1 (0.0)	15 (0.6)	52 (2.0)	89 (3.5)	190 (7.5)	828 (32.6)
Average rainy days (≥ 1 mm)	14	12	11	8	4	1	1	1	2	6	9	12	81
Source 1: World Weather Online
Source 2: Climate Data

== See also ==
- Levant
- Shaam

== Bibliography ==
- Helmolt, Hans Ferdinand (1907), The World's History: Central and northern Europe, The University of Michigan
- Mallett, Alex (2014). "ʿAmmār, Banū (Syria)". In Fleet, Kate; Krämer, Gudrun; Matringe, Denis; Nawas, John; Rowson, Everett (eds.). Encyclopaedia of Islam (3rd ed.). Brill Online. doi:10.1163/1573-3912_ei3_COM_24909. ISSN 1873-9830.
- Wiet, G. (1960). "ʿAmmār". In Gibb, H. A. R.; Kramers, J. H.; Lévi-Provençal, E.; Schacht, J.; Lewis, B. & Pellat, Ch. (eds.). The Encyclopaedia of Islam, Second Edition. Volume I: A–B. Leiden: E. J. Brill. p. 448. doi:10.1163/1573-3912_islam_SIM_0625. OCLC 495469456.
- Winter, Stefan (2016), A History of the Alawis: From Medieval Syria to the Turkish Republic, Princeton University Press, ISBN 9780691173894
