= Yon (name) =

Yon is a given name and a surname.

Notable people with the name include:

== Given name ==
- Yon García (born 1979), Spanish former figure skater and five-time Spanish national champion
- Yon Goicoechea (born 1984), Venezuelan lawyer and political activist
- Yon González (born 1986), Spanish actor
- Pak Yŏn, Korean name of Jan Jansz Weltevree (1595-?), shipwrecked Dutch sailor Jan Jansz. Weltevree
- Yon Soriano (born 1987), Dominican sprinter
- Yon Tumarkin (born 1989), Israeli actor and singer

== Surname ==
- Yon Hyong-muk (1931–2005), North Korean politician and Prime Minister of North Korea
- Marco Yon (1929–1970), Guatemalan revolutionary
- Michael Yon (born 1964), American writer and photographer
- Pietro Yon (1886–1943), Italian organist and composer
- Tom Yon (1882–1971), American politician
- Simon "Yon" Hall, a member of the Australian musical comedy trio Tripod
