= Hugo (cocktail) =

Wine cocktail

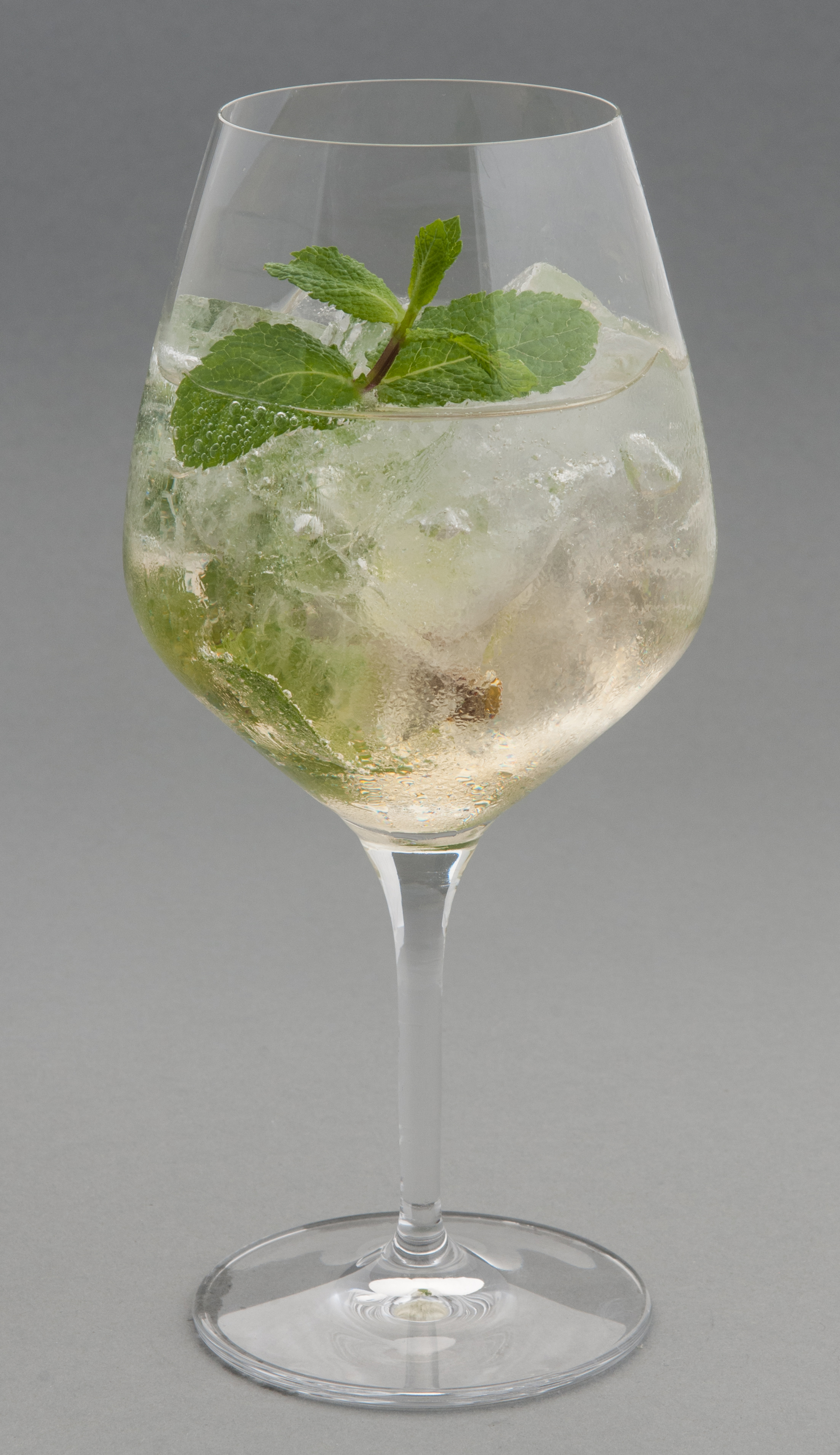
- Type: Spritz (cocktail)
- Ingredients: prosecco; elderflower liqueur or lemon balm syrup; sparkling water
- Base spirit: Sparkling wine
- Standard drinkware: Wine glass (white)
- Standard garnish: mint leaves
- Served: On the rocks: poured over ice
- Preparation: Stir together over plenty of ice.

The Hugo is an alcoholic aperitif, originating in South Tyrol, but widespread in Triveneto, Austria, Switzerland and Germany, based on prosecco, elderflower liqueur (or lemon balm syrup), sparkling water and mint leaves.

== Origins ==
As reported by the magazines Mixology and Der Spiegel, the Hugo was conceived in 2005 by Naturns bar manager Roland Gruber (aka A.K.) at San Zeno Bar, as an alternative to Spritz Veneziano, and quickly spread beyond the borders of South Tyrol. Initially, the recipe provided for the use of lemon balm syrup. Shortly after its conception, this was replaced with an elderflower liqueur, typically St-Germain.

The name was chosen at random by its creator: initially he chose the name Otto, but he changed his mind because he did not think it was appropriate.
