= Walter Hugo =

Walter Hugo is a London-based artist, working in the media of sculpture, photography, film, and performance.

Hugo has exhibited at SHOWstudio, showing part of his body of work Reflecting The Bright Lights. This formed part of the Practice to Deceive exhibition in April 2011. For this body of work, he built a room-sized camera and utilised an 18th-century lens to create a series of portraits shot directly onto glass plates.

During the course of the exhibition, Hugo re-built the camera on site in SHOWstudio for an online live stream of the process of creating the portraits.
