= Hugh of Jabala =

Hugh was the bishop of Jabala, or, as it was then called, Gibellum, a town in Syria, during the 12th century. When the County of Edessa fell to Zengi in 1144, Raymond of Antioch sent Hugh to report the news to Pope Eugene III. In response, Eugene issued the papal bull Quantum praedecessores the following year calling for the Second Crusade. Hugh also told the historian Otto of Freising about Prester John, the mythical Nestorian Christian priest-king of India, who was intending to help the Crusader States against the Saracens. Otto included the story in his Chronicon of 1145; it is the first recorded mention of the Prester John legend.
