= Victor Hugo (cricketer) =

Australian cricketer

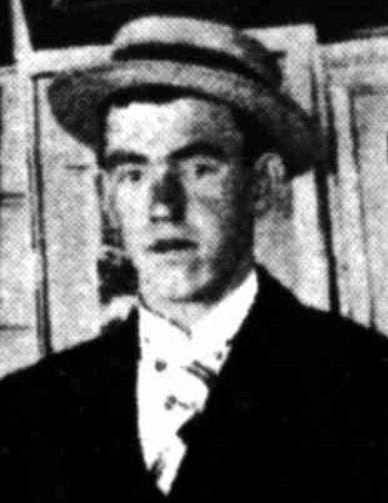

Personal information
- Born: 25 November 1877; Adelaide, South Australia
- Died: 8 April 1930 (aged 52); Malvern, Adelaide, South Australia
- Batting: Left-handed
- Bowling: Right-arm medium-pace

Domestic team information
- Years: Team
- 1897-98 to 1899-1900: South Australia

Career statistics
Competition	First-class
Matches	9
Runs scored	81
Batting average	6.23
100s/50s	0/0
Top score	25
Balls bowled	1347
Wickets	23
Bowling average	25.17
5 wickets in innings	0
10 wickets in match	0
Best bowling	4/69
Catches/stumpings	8/0
- Source: Cricinfo, 1 August 2019

Victor Hugo (25 November 1877 – 8 April 1930) was a cricketer who played first-class cricket for South Australia from 1898 to 1900. He was related to the French writer of the same name.

Victor Hugo was born in Adelaide at the Bushman's Club, of which his father William was one of the founders. He was educated at Prince Alfred College and at the Adelaide Shorthand and Business Training Academy, where he excelled at bookkeeping.

A right-arm medium-pace bowler, his best figures for South Australia were 4 for 69 against Western Australia in 1898-99.

He worked for the South Australian Produce Department for 25 years until his death. He left a widow, a son (also called Victor) and a daughter.
