= Hughes (given name) =

Hughes is a given name. Notable people with the name include:

- Hughes Cleaver (1892–1980), Canadian politician
- Hughes Eng (fl. from 1959), Canadian community activist
- Hughes Rudd (1921–1992), American television journalist and news correspondent
- Hughes Winborne (fl. from 1980), American film editor
