= Huon =

Huon may refer to:

- Jean-Michel Huon de Kermadec, French explorer
- Named after him:
  - Huon Gulf, large gulf in Papua New Guinea
  - Huon Island, Tasmania
  - Huon Peninsula, large peninsula in Papua New Guinea
  - Huon pine, species of conifer native to Tasmania
  - Huon River, fourth largest river in Tasmania
  - Huon Valley, valley and local government district in Tasmania
  - Port Huon, Tasmania
- Huon of Bordeaux, character from medieval chansons de geste
- King-Emperor Huon of Granbretan, a fictional character in the work of Michael Moorcock
- Huon particles, an ancient power source appearing in the Doctor Who episode "The Runaway Bride"
- HMAS Huon, two ships and a shore base of the Royal Australian Navy
- Huon, Victoria, a locality in Australia
