= Charles Hugo =

Charles Hugo may refer to:

- Charles-Hyacinthe Hugo (1667–1739), French Premonstratensian author
- Charles Hugo (sailor), French sailor who competed in the 1900 Summer Olympics
- Charles Hugo (writer) (1826–1871), French writer, son to Victor Hugo
- Chad Hugo (Charles Edward Hugo, born 1974), American multi-instrumentalist and record producer
