= Hugo, West Virginia =

Hugo
- Unincorporated community
- Location within the state of West Virginia Hugo (the United States)
- Coordinates: 38°35′1″N 81°51′26″W
- Country: United States
- State: West Virginia
- County: Putnam
- Elevation: 984 ft (300 m)
- Time zone: UTC-5 (Eastern (EST))
  - Summer (DST): UTC-4 (EDT)
- GNIS ID: 1554757

Hugo is an unincorporated community in Putnam County, West Virginia, United States.
