= Hugo Josefsson =

Swedish philatelist

Hugo Josefsson is a Swedish philatelist who in 1986 won the Grand Prix National at the STOCKHOLMIA 86 international stamp exhibition. In 1990 he was awarded the Strandell Medal by the Scandinavian Collectors Club. He is a specialist in the nineteenth century stamps of Sweden.
