= Huw Edwards-Jones =

British furniture designer

Huw Edwards-Jones (born 1956, Rustington, West Sussex) is a cabinetmaker who has been awarded five Guild Marks (Bespoke Guild Mark Nos. 191, 194, 221, 272, 290) and has exhibited at the Guild Mark exhibition at Philips in London, Cheltenham and other places. He is a Liveryman and Freeman of the City of London.

== Early life ==
His joined the Merchant Navy when he left school in 1974, training as a navigation officer. It was on one voyage that the ship's carpenter gave him some mahogany and he began to do some wood-carving.

== Career ==
Moving to Brighton, he was apprenticed to A. J. Hartnett, antique restorer, and Michael Norman, an antiques specialist, in 1976, Old furniture Masterpieces and designs were fashionable at the time, he was able to learn about proportion and the significance of it to design.

In 1976 he set up his own business as a restorer and in 1990 started his own workshop after obtaining a degree in design. The workshop produces one-off masterpieces, at the rate of just a few per year. It is based at Hankham, a village near to Pevensey

He was granted his first Guild Mark of five to date in 1991, the same year that he became a Liveryman of the Worshipful Company of Furniture Makers & Freeman of the city of London.

He was commissioned at short notice to produce a gift for the wedding of Prince Edward, Earl of Wessex and Sophie Rhys-Jones in 1999. He spent 15 minutes designing the yin-yang fish box, featuring two carved interlocked koi carp in Burr Palm solid Ebony and Swiss Pearwood making the finished item within two weeks. HRH. Huw has also worked on a memorial to R. J. Mitchell, designer of the Spitfire aeroplane. This piece was a conference table made from original Spitfire parts. After five years in the design and making, it was featured at the 150th anniversary to Henry Royce at the Dorchester in Mayfair, London.

Huw has also appeared on John Bly's 'Heirlooms' program with some of his work.

Huws work has appeared in many top exhibitions including, 'Philips' of Bond street, Cheltenham exhibition of excellence, Olympia Fine Art & Antiques, Celebration to Henry Royce Mayfair London as well as his own exhibitions of his work in central London.

== Personal life ==
He is married with four children.
