= Hugh Seymour =

Hugh Seymour may refer to:

- Lord Hugh Seymour (1759–1801), British admiral
- Hugh Henry John Seymour (1790–1821), British Army officer and politician, MP for Antrim 1818–21
- Hugh Seymour, 6th Marquess of Hertford (1843–1912)
- Hugh Seymour, 8th Marquess of Hertford (1930–1997)
