= HU-GO =

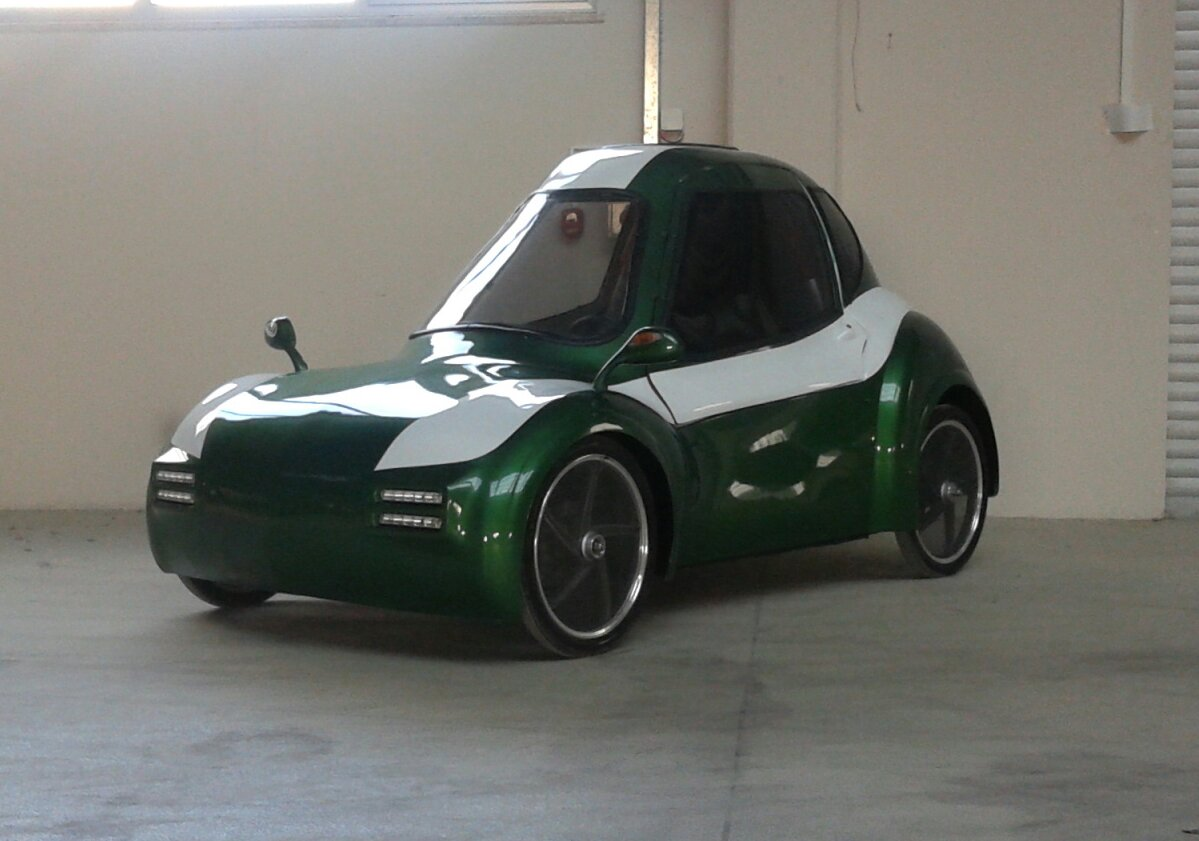
The HU-GO at the Hacettepe University, Automotive Engineering Laboratory.

HU-GO, is a single-seater ultra-light concept electric vehicle designed and built at the Automotive Engineering Department of Hacettepe University, Ankara, Turkey by a team led by Prof. Engin Tanık and Prof. Volkan Parlaktaş. The main goal of the project is to prove that a light electric vehicle can have an acceptable range without requiring heavy and expensive batteries.

== Design ==
=== Chassis and body ===
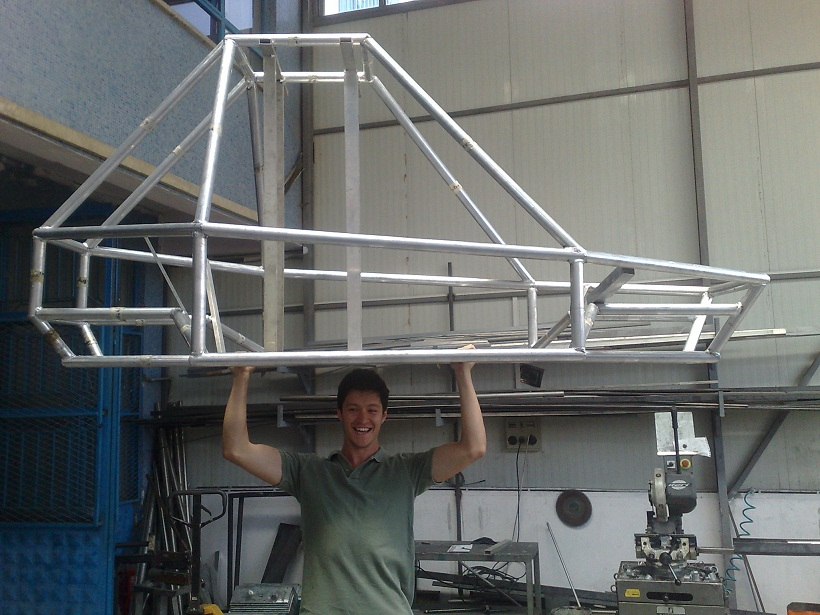
HU-GO's chassis weighs only 24 kg.

HU-GO has a very light (24 kg) space frame chassis made of aluminum tubes. The body, which is mounted on the chassis is made of fiberglass. Windscreen and wheel covers are made from Plexiglas. All of the components are designed (or selected) within a narrow range of safety factors to keep the weight low. As a result, HU-GO has a competitive weight of only 257 kg in total. While reducing the weight, rollover and torsional stiffness calculations have done by using finite elements method software for safety, and successful simulation results were obtained.

=== Batteries ===
LiFePO_{4}-type batteries are used in HU-GO. Contrary to its rivals, HU-GO has a battery pack that weighs only 53 kg, which is sufficient for a range of 100 kilometers. With its energy consumption of 50 Wh/km, HU-GO is one of the least energy-consuming four-wheeled vehicles in the world. HU-GO can be fully charged in 4 hours, from a standard household outlet. Also with regenerative braking, the vehicle can charge its batteries by converting the kinetic energy to the electric energy, when the throttle pedal is released off.

=== Performance and handling ===
Beside the lightness, “fun handling” is the other design philosophy of HU-GO. For that reason, double wishbone suspensions are implemented for both axles as in the sport cars. HU-GO has a total power of 17 hp produced by two separate electric motors. This power brings HU-GO to a maximum speed of 100 km/h. HU-GO can accelerate 0 to 50 km/h in 5 seconds.

== Build ==
90% of the production of the parts and assembly was done in the Hacettepe University Automotive Engineering Department laboratories. The project is sponsored by Hacettepe University, Hacettepe University Technopolis and Mutlu Batteries . Total cost of the prototype was about US$17,000.
