= Huw Spratling =

British composer (born 1949)

Huw Spratling (born 1949) is a British composer. Spratling has collaborated on compositions with Sir Charles Groves and others.

== Works ==
- Sinfonietta for Strings, 1985

== Recordings ==
- The Choral Music of Huw Spratling Mass of the Holy Spirit. O Salutaris Hostia. Tantum Ergo. Sinfonietta for Strings. Harp Sonatina. In Paradisum. O Magnum Mysterium. S. Bullock & T. Chadwell, J. Dyball, J. Hatton. Somm Records
