= Hugh of Toulouse =

Hugh may be the name of a Count of Toulouse, Nîmes, Quercy, and Albi in the third quarter of the 10th century, and perhaps identical to a Bishop Hugh. He was the son of Raymond III, Count of Toulouse and probably grandson of Raymond Pons.

His story is confusing and identification of the various persons named Hugh who appear to have been the same is disputed. The Códice de Roda mentions him (992) as Ucus episcopus or "Bishop Hugh" and informs us that he died during a hunt. His diocese is unknown. A pedigree in the same codex shows (Raymond) Pons and his wife Garsenda of Toulouse having a son Raymond and grandchildren Raymond and Hugh. In the 961 testament of Raymond II of Rouergue, a person named Hugh is referred to as a nephew (or grandson). In the codicil testament of his grandmother Garsenda, he is Ugoni comite nepoti meo, or "Count Hugh, my grandson (or nephew)." It is unknown why Hugh, the younger son, is named before his supposed elder brother Raymond or why he is given the comital title when Raymond is not and he nowhere else appears with it. The question of when he went from being count to bishop is also unanswered, if these are even the same person.

== Sources ==
- Foixstory: Les Comtes de Toulouse.
