= Hugh Percy =

Hugh Percy may refer to:

- Hugh Percy, 1st Duke of Northumberland (c. 1714–1786), English peer, landowner and art patron
- Hugh Percy, 2nd Duke of Northumberland (1742–1817), British army officer and British peer
- Hugh Percy, 3rd Duke of Northumberland (1785–1847), British aristocrat and Tory politician
- Hugh Percy (bishop) (1784–1856), British churchman, bishop of Rochester and bishop of Carlisle
- Hugh Percy, 10th Duke of Northumberland (1914–1988)
