= Hugh Herdon =

British Indian Army general (1871–1958)

Major-General Hugh Herdon CB CIE
- Born: Hugh Edward Herdon; 28 October 1871
- Died: 11 March 1958 (aged 86)
- Military career
- Allegiance: United Kingdom
- Branch: British Indian Army
- Rank: Major-General
- Commands: 13th Indian Infantry Brigade; Waziristan District
- Conflicts: North-West Frontier; Tirah Expedition; First Waziristan Campaign
- Awards: Companion of the Order of the Bath; Companion of the Order of the Indian Empire

Major-General Hugh Edward Herdon CB CIE (28 October 1871 – 11 March 1958) was a British Indian Army officer.

Herdon was educated at the Royal Military College, Sandhurst, as a Queen's India Cadet and was commissioned second lieutenant in the Wiltshire Regiment in July 1892. He was promoted lieutenant in August 1894, transferred to the Indian Army in December 1896 and joined the 55th Coke's Rifles. He served in the Tirah Expedition in 1897–1898 and on the North-West Frontier in 1901–1902. He was promoted captain in 1901 and major in July 1910 and served as a brigade major from November 1908 and as a deputy assistant adjutant and quartermaster-general from 6 August 1914 to 16 March 1915 and 30 December 1915 to 8 January 1916, a general staff officer grade 2 from 17 March 1915 to 29 December 1915 and 27 March to 9 July 1917, deputy assistant adjutant-general from 9 to 27 January 1916, and assistant quartermaster-general from 10 July 1917 to 17 February 1918.

As a lieutenant-colonel, he served with the Bushire Field Force in Persia in 1919, for which he was mentioned in despatches and appointed Companion of the Order of the Indian Empire (CIE) in January 1920, and also served in the Third Anglo-Afghan War in 1919, for which he was promoted brevet colonel in January 1920, and in Waziristan in 1919–1920, for which he was again mentioned in despatches. He was promoted substantive colonel in March 1922.

He was promoted temporary colonel-commandant in May 1922 and commanded the 13th Indian Infantry Brigade from June 1923 to May 1926, and served in Waziristan in 1922–1923, for which he was appointed Companion of the Order of the Bath (CB) in May 1924. He was promoted major-general in November 1926 and was General Officer Commanding Waziristan District from November 1927 to November 1931, when he retired.

Herdon served as colonel of the 1st (Coke's) Battalion, 13th Frontier Force Rifles, the successor to his old regiment, from May 1933 to September 1945. He was married to Laura. Their only son, Lieutenant-Colonel Hugh Owen Seymour (Hoss) Herdon, was killed in action in Normandy on 7 June 1944 while commanding the 2nd Battalion, Royal Warwickshire Regiment, aged 38. He is buried in La Délivrande War Cemetery in Douvres-la-Délivrande.
