= Huguette Gaulin =

French Canadian novelist (1944–1972)

Huguette Gaulin Bergeron (1944 – June 6, 1972), was a French Canadian novelist, who committed suicide publicly by self-immolation in a major street of the Old Port of Montreal, Place Jacques-Cartier, while screaming "Vous avez détruit la beauté du monde!" ("You have destroyed the beauty of the world!").

Luc Plamondon, a French-Canadian lyricist, was inspired to write a hymn in Huguette Gaulin Bergeron's honour, with music by Christian Saint-Roch. The hymn, entitled Hymne à la beauté du monde, has since been sung by numerous French-Canadian artists such as Diane Dufresne, Isabelle Boulay, Garou, and Éric Lapointe.

== Works ==
- Lecture En Velocipede, 1972
