= Hugues Absil =

French painter

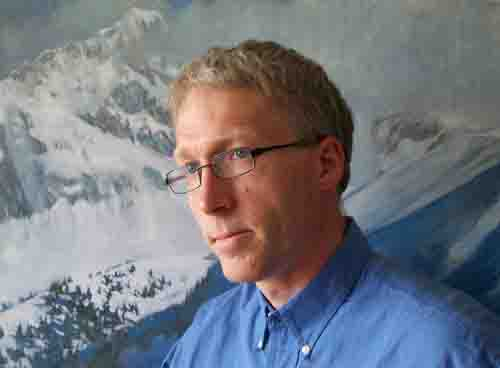
Hugues Absil

Hugues Absil (born 8 June 1961) is a French painter.

== Biography ==
Born in 1961 in Paris, Hugues Absil studied in the École nationale supérieure des Beaux-Arts. He learned painting and lithography with Abraham Hadad, and drawing with Daniel Sénélar (1990). He worked on Fernand Léger and Paul Klee. He has made several exhibitions since 1986.

== Works ==
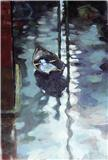
Venise
