= Ugo =

Ugo or UGO may refer to:

- Ugo (given name), including a list of people with the name
- Ugo, Akita, a town in Japan
- Ugo Province, an old province of Japan
- Ugo (retailer), a British chain of convenience stores
- UGO Networks, an American website company
- United Galactic Organization, a fictional entity in Space Patrol (1962 TV series)

== See also ==
- Hugo (disambiguation)
