= Hugh of Lusignan =

Hugh of Lusignan was a common name for French of the House of Lusignan.

== People with the name ==
- Hugh I (early 10th century)
- Hugh II (died 967)
- Hugh III
- Hugh IV
- Hugh V (died 1060)
- Hugh VI (died 1110)
- Hugh VII (died 1151)
- Hugh VIII (died 1165)
- Hugh IX (died 1219)
- Hugh X (died 1249)
- Hugh XI (died 1260)
- Hugh XII (died btw. 1270–1282)
- Hugh XIII (died 1303)
- Hugh IX (died 1219)
- Hugh X (died 1249)
- Hugh XI (died 1260)
- Hugh XII (died 1282)
- Hugh XIII (died 1303)
- Hugh of Lusignan (claimant) (died 1385), Prince of Galilee and claimant to the Kingdom of Cyprus.
- Hugues Lancelot de Lusignan (died 1442), a Greek cardinal
