= Hugh IV of Lusignan =

French noble

Hugh IV (died c. 1026), called Brunus (Latin for the Brown), was the fourth Lord of Lusignan. He was the son of Hugh III Albus and Arsendis de Vivonne. He was a turbulent baron, who brought his family out of obscurity and on their way to prominence in European and eventually even Middle Eastern affairs.

Hugh spent many years in war with the Viscounts of Thouars over a fief he claimed was rightfully his. Peace was obtained briefly by Hugh's marriage to Audéarde or Aldiarde, the daughter of the viscount Ralph of Thouars. As a dowry, Hugh received the castle of Mouzeuil. Hugh already held the castle of Lusignan, built by his grandfather Hugh Carus, and that of Couhé, built by the duke of Aquitaine. When Ralph, died, however, his successor Geoffrey retook Mouzeuil.

Hugh also engaged in a long war with Aimery I, lord of Rancon, who seized Civray, a fief of Bernard I of La Marche. By alliance with Duke William V of Aquitaine, Hugh and Bernard retook Civray and Hugh held it as a fief, though he lost it soon after. Nevertheless, he continued his war with Aimery.

When the Viscounty of Châtellerault fell vacant, Hugh asked the duke for it, but was put off with empty promises. Hugh waged war with the duke until the latter granted him the fief of Vivonne, which had once belonged to his uncle Joscelin. William later deprived Hugh of the proceeds of the tax on Saint-Maixent which his mother Emma, wife of William IV of Aquitaine, had granted Hugh's father.

On 6 March 1025, Hugh exchanged lands with the abbey of Saint-Hilaire of Poitiers in order to found a monastery for his soul. The duke obtained two charters from King Robert II confirming this monastic establishment and another at Couhé. Hugh and the Poitevin bishop Isembart then sent letters to Pope John XIX to beg exemption for his monasteries from all authority save that of Nouaillé. Said exemption was granted.

At his monastery of Notre-Dame de Lusignan, a monastic chronicler wrote the Conventum inter Guillelmum ducem Aquitaniae et Hugonem Chiliarchum celebrating Hugh's warmaking. According to the Conventum, Hugh died a year after his final agreement with the duke, probably in 1026 or thereabouts. He left two sons by Audéarde: Hugh V, who succeeded him, and Rorgo.

== Sources ==
- Painter, Sidney (1957). "The Lords of Lusignan in the Eleventh and Twelfth Centuries". Speculum. 32 (Jan). University of Chicago Press: 27–47. doi:10.2307/2849244. JSTOR 2849244. S2CID 161153870.

French nobility
Preceded by Hugh III	Lord of Lusignan	Succeeded by Hugh V
