= House of Lusignan =

Former French noble family founded in the 10th century

House of Lusignan Maison de Lusignan
- Crusader royal family
- Royal banner of Janus of Cyprus
- Country: Kingdom of France; Kingdom of Jerusalem; Kingdom of Cyprus; Kingdom of Cilician Armenia
- Etymology: From the city of Lusignan, Vienne
- Place of origin: Poitou, France
- Founded: 10th century
- Founder: Hugh I of Lusignan
- Final ruler: James III
- Titles: Lord of Lusignan (10th century – 1308); Count of La Marche (1199–1309); Count of Angoulême (1246–1309); King of Jerusalem (1186–1192; still titular); King of Cyprus (1192–1474); King of Armenia (Cilicia) (1342–1464)
- Motto: Pour Loyauté Maintenir (To retain loyalty)
- Estates: Château de Lusignan (ancestral seat); Royal Palace (Cypriot seat)
- Dissolution: 1267 (agnatic line); 1487 (cognatic line)

The House of Lusignan (/ˈluːzɪn.jɒn/ LOO-zin-yon; French: [lyziɲɑ̃]) was a royal house of French origin, which at various times ruled several principalities in Europe and the Levant, including the kingdoms of Jerusalem, Cyprus, and Armenian Cilicia, from the 12th through the 15th centuries during the Middle Ages. It also had great influence in England and France.

The family originated in Lusignan, in Poitou, western France, in the early 10th century. By the end of the 11th century, the family had risen to become the most prominent petty lords in the region from their castle at Lusignan. In the late 12th century, through marriages and inheritance, a cadet branch of the family came to control the kingdoms of Jerusalem and Cyprus. In the early 13th century, the main branch succeeded to the Counties of La Marche and Angoulême.

As Crusader kings in the Latin East, they soon had connections with the Hethumid rulers of the Kingdom of Cilicia, which they inherited through marriage in the mid-14th century. The Armenian branch fled to France, and eventually Russia, after the Mamluk conquest of their kingdom.

The claim was taken by the Cypriot branch, until their line failed. Cyprus was annexed by the Republic of Venice in the late 15th century.

== First House of Lusignan ==
=== Origins ===
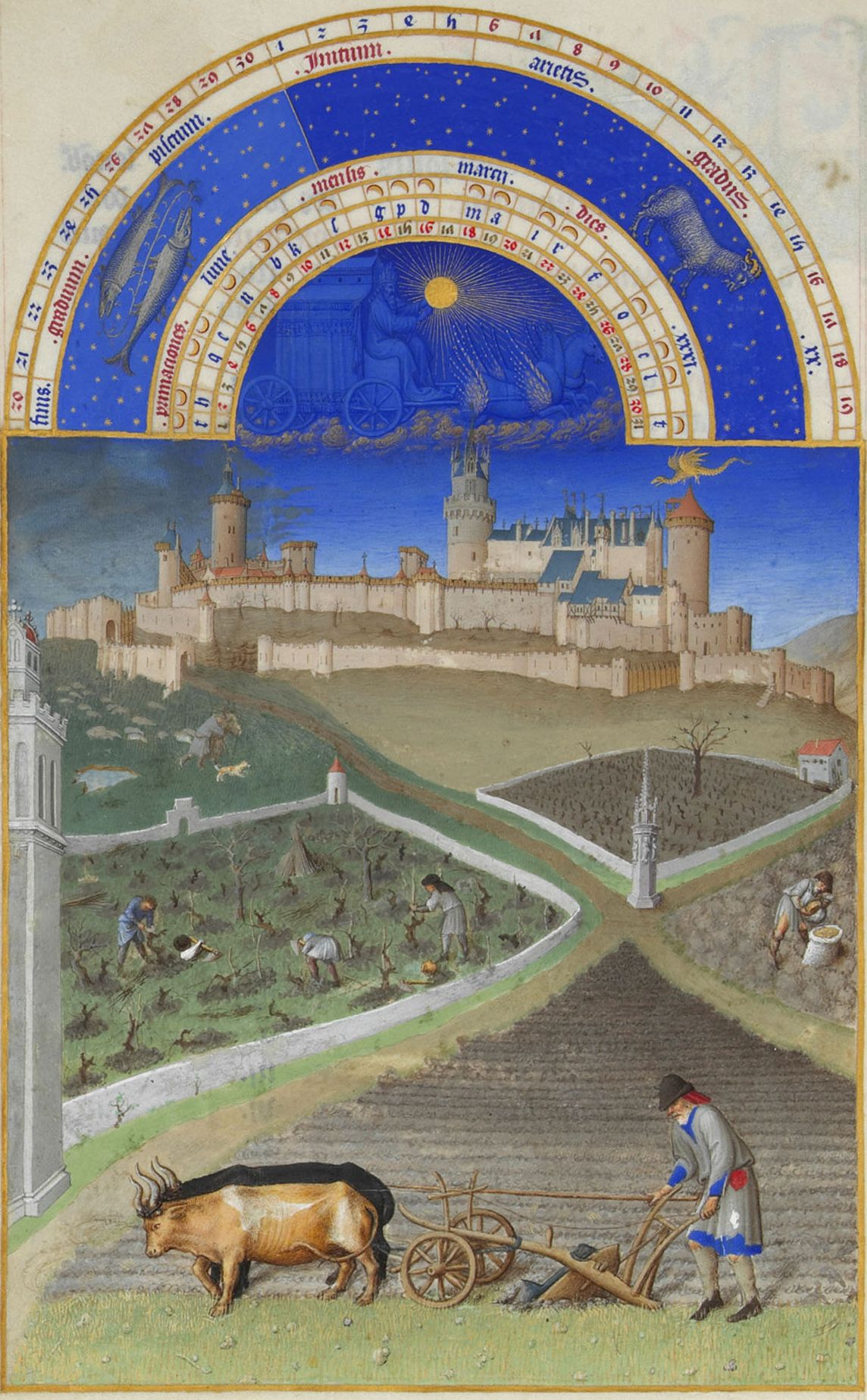
Les Très Riches Heures du duc de Berry (1412/16), March: the Château de Lusignan

The Château de Lusignan, near Poitiers, was the principal seat of the Lusignans. It is shown at its height in the March illumination in the Trés Riches Heures of the Duc de Berry (c. 1412). Louis XIV fortified it and it was used as a prison, a school, and a quarry for building materials. It was leveled to the ground in the 18th century to create a park for local residents. Only its foundations remain today. According to folklore, the earliest castle was built by Melusine, a water-spirit.

The lords of the castle at Lusignan became counts of La Marche in the 12th century. They added the county of Angoulême to their holdings in 1220, when Hugh X of Lusignan married Isabella of Angoulême, daughter of Count Aymer of Angoulême and widow of John, King of England. These acquisitions produced complicated titles. For example, Hugh XI of Lusignan was Hugh VI of La Marche and Hugh II of Angoulême. Hugh XIII died in 1303. His sisters, Jeanne and Isabelle, sold the county of Angoulême to Philip IV of France. Hugh was succeeded by his brother, Guy I, who died in 1308, making their sister Yolande Countess of La Marche. After Yolande's death, in 1314, King Philip annexed La Marche.

=== In France ===
==== Lords of Lusignan ====
Arms of the lords of Lusignan

- Hugh I (early 10th century)
- Hugh II (died 967)
- Hugh III
- Hugh IV
- Hugh V (died 1060), who married Almodis of La Marche, the daughter of Count Bernard I of La Marche.

==== Counts of La Marche / Counts of Eu ====
- Hugh VI (died 1110), who inherited by collateral succession the County of La Marche (1091) as a descendant of Almodis of La Marche.
- Hugh VII (died 1151)
- Hugh VIII (died 1165), whose younger son was Aimery of Lusignan, the first king of Cyprus also King of Jerusalem
- Hugh IX (died 1219), Count of Eu
  - Raoul I (1191–1219), Count of Eu, second son of Hugh IX
  - Raoul II (1219–1246), Count of Eu
  - Marie (1246–1260), Count of Eu

==== Counts of La Marche and Angoulême ====
The lion rampant added to the original arms of Lusignan was an augmentation of honour granted by Richard the Lionheart during the Third Crusade (1189–92)

- Hugh X (died 1249), son of Hugh IX, married Isabelle of Angoulême, thus securing Angoulême (1220)
- Hugh XI (died 1250)
- Hugh XII (died 1270)
- Hugh XIII (died 1303)
- Guy (died 1308)
- Yolande (died 1314)

Guy's sisters, Jeanne and Isabelle, sold Angoulême to Philip IV of France after Guy's death. Yolande sold the fiefs of Lusignan, La Marche and Fougères to Philip IV of France in 1308. They became a part of the French royal demesne and a common appanage of the crown.

=== Crusader kings ===
==== Aimery at the Jerusalem court ====
In the 1170s, Aimery of Lusignan (c. 1145 – 1205) (a younger son of Hugh VIII) arrived in Jerusalem, having been expelled from his realm by Richard the Lionheart, then acting Duke of Aquitaine, which included the family lands of Lusignan near Poitiers. Aimery, named Amalric by outdated scholarship, married Eschiva, the daughter of Baldwin of Ibelin, and entered court circles.

Aimery had also obtained the patronage of Agnes of Courtenay (the divorced mother of King Baldwin IV of Jerusalem and the wife of Reginald of Sidon), who held the county of Jaffa and Ascalon. Agnes appointed Aimery as Constable of Jaffa, and later as Constable of the Kingdom of Jerusalem. Hostile rumours alleged that Aimery was Agnes's lover, but this is questionable. It is more likely that his promotions were aimed at weaning him away from the political orbit of the Ibelin family, who were associated with Raymond III of Tripoli, the cousin of King Amalric of Jerusalem and a former bailli or regent.

==== Guy of Lusignan ====
Aimery’s younger brother, Guy of Lusignan (c. 1150 – 1194), arrived in Jerusalem before Easter 1180, although Ernoul said that he arrived on the advice of Aimery. Some modern historians believe that Guy was already well established in Jerusalem by 1180, but there is no supporting contemporary evidence. Aimery's success facilitated the social and political advancement of Guy.

Older accounts, derived from William of Tyre and Ernoul, claim that Agnes of Courtenay was concerned that her political rivals, headed by Raymond of Tripoli, intended to exercise more control by forcing her daughter, the widowed Sibylla (sister and heir presumptive to King Baldwin IV) to marry a man of their choosing. Agnes was said to have foiled these plans by advising her son Baldwin to have Sibylla married to Guy; however Baldwin, now believed to have been less malleable than earlier historians have portrayed, was considering the international implications of his sister's marriage. The best husband for her would be a knight who could rally external help to the kingdom, and not a local nobleman. As the new king of France, Philip II, was still a minor, Baldwin's first cousin King Henry II of England seemed the best prospect for such help and he owed the Pope a penitential pilgrimage to the Holy Land on account of his responsibility for the murder of Archbishop Thomas Becket. Guy was a vassal of both King Henry and of his son Richard of Poitou (the future King Richard I) and had formerly been rebellious, so they wanted to keep him overseas.

Guy and Sibylla were hastily married at Easter 1180, apparently preventing a coup by Raymond's faction to marry her to Baldwin of Ibelin, the father-in-law of Aimery. By this marriage, Guy became Count of Jaffa and Ascalon and Bailli of Jerusalem. Sibylla already had a son from her first marriage to William of Montferrat, and by Guy she had two daughters, Alice and Mary de Lusignan.

Map of the Crusader States in 1165. At the height of their power, the Lusignans ruled the Kingdom of Jerusalem, the Principality of Antioch, and the County of Tripoli

An ambitious man, Guy convinced King Baldwin IV to name him as regent in early 1182. But he and Raynald of Châtillon provoked Saladin, the Sultan of Egypt and Syria, during a two-year period of truce. More important to Baldwin IV's disillusionment with him was Guy's military hesitation during the Siege of Kerak. Throughout late 1183 and 1184 Baldwin IV tried to have his sister's marriage to Guy annulled, showing that Baldwin still held his sister with some favour. Baldwin IV had wanted a loyal brother-in-law, and was frustrated in Guy's hardheadedness and disobedience. Sibylla remained at Ascalon, though perhaps not against her will.

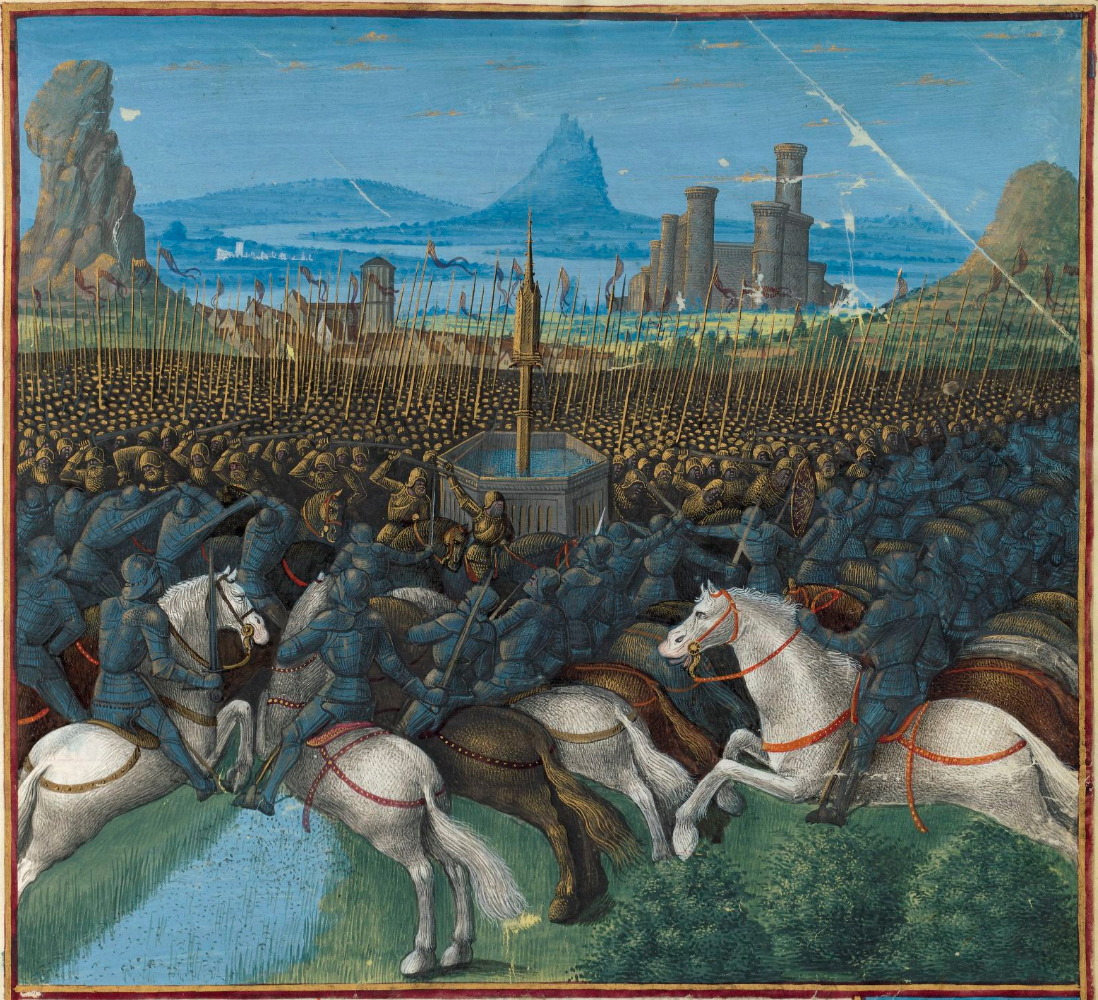
Battle of Hattin in which Guy de Lusignan was captured by Saladin, and Jerusalem was lost. From a copy of the Passages d’outremer, c.1490.

Unsuccessful in prying his sister and close heir away from Guy, the king and the Haute Cour altered the succession. They placed Baldwin V, Sibylla's son from her first marriage, in precedence over Sibylla. They also established a process to choose the monarch afterwards between Sibylla and Isabella (whom Baldwin and the Haute Cour thus recognized as at least equally entitled to succession as Sibylla), though Sibylla was not herself excluded from the succession. After the death of Baldwin V in 1186, Guy and Sibylla went to Jerusalem for the funeral, accompanied by an armed guard. Sibylla was crowned as Queen of Jerusalem, on the condition that she annul her marriage with Guy. In return she could marry whom she chose. Her decision to remarry Guy angered the barons.

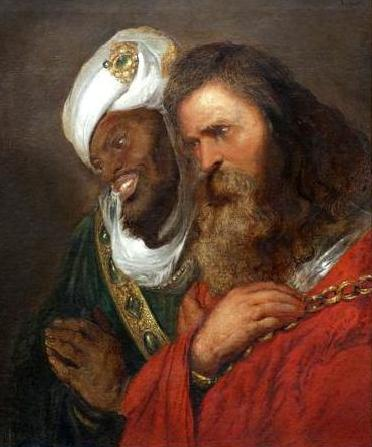
Guy de Lusignan and Saladin. Saladin en Guy de Lusignan, 1625 painting by Jan Lievens.

Guy's term as king is generally seen as a disaster; he was defeated by Saladin at the Battle of Hattin in 1187, and was imprisoned in Damascus while Saladin reconquered almost the entire kingdom.

Upon his release, Guy and Sibylla sought refuge in Tyre, but were denied entry by rival Conrad of Montferrat, the husband of Isabella. During the Siege of Acre in 1191, Sibylla and their two daughters died. Isabella succeeded to the throne as the queen of Jerusalem. Guy left for Limassol and met with Richard, now king of England. He joined the latter's conquest of Cyprus, which was retaliation for the lord of Cyprus having taken Richard's fiancée prisoner. Afterwards Richard and Guy returned to the siege of Acre. Richard gave up his claim to Jerusalem and supported Guy, while the king of France and the duke of Austria supported their kinsman Conrad. Guy still saved Conrad's life when he was surrounded by the enemy. Richard put the matter of the kingdom of Jerusalem to a vote, which Conrad won, leaving Guy powerless.

Richard sold Cyprus to the Knight Templars, who in turn sold it to Guy. Guy died in 1194, leaving Cyprus to his older brother Aimery.

==== Aimery becomes king ====
Henry VI, Holy Roman Emperor crowned Aimery as the first king of Cyprus. In 1197 Aimery married Isabella, which brought the crown of Jerusalem back to the Lusignans. One of Aimery's first actions as king was to make a five-year truce with the Ayyubids.

=== In England ===
Meanwhile, in France, Hugh le Brun de Lusignan ("Hugh the Brown-haired"), like most of the lords of Poitou, backed Arthur of Brittany as the better heir to Richard the Lionheart when the latter's brother John Lackland acceded to the throne of England in 1199. John's mother Eleanor of Aquitaine traded English claims for their support of her son. To secure his position in La Marche, the widowed Hugh arranged a betrothal with the heiress Isabella of Angoulême. However John obtained her hand first, and married her in August 1200, thus depriving Hugh of La Marche and his brother of Eu in Normandy.

The aggrieved Lusignans turned to their feudal overlord Philip Augustus, King of France, who demanded John's presence – a tactical impossibility – and declared John a "contumacious vassal." As the Lusignan allies detained both Arthur and Eleanor, John surprised their unprepared forces at the castle of Mirebeau in July 1202, and took Hugh prisoner with 200 of his troops. King John's savage treatment of the captives caused outrage among his supporters, and his French barons began to desert him. The Lusignans' diplomatic rebellion resulted in the loss to England of half its territory in France, soon incorporated into his kingdom by Philip Augustus. (The other "half", Aquitaine, remained the possession of John's surviving mother Eleanor of Aquitaine). John died in 1216, leaving his son Henry III as king. His widow Isabella of Angoulême finally married Hugh X of Lusignan in 1220, and bore him five children.

Coat of arms of William de Valence, 1st Earl of Pembroke, a difference of Lusignan

In 1247, Guillaume de Lusignan –known in English as William de Valence– a younger son of Hugh X and Isabella, moved from France to England along with two of his brothers at the request of their half-brother King Henry III. William and his brothers were quickly placed in positions of power by the King; William was married to Joan de Munchensi (d. 1307), a granddaughter and heiress to William Marshal, 1st Earl of Pembroke and was granted custody of the lands and the title of Earl of Pembroke, giving him great wealth and power in his new land. As a result he was unpopular and was heavily involved in the Second Barons' War, supporting the King and Prince Edward against the rebels led by Simon de Montfort. After the final defeat of the rebels at the Battle of Evesham in 1265, William continued to serve Henry III, and then Edward I, until his death in 1296.

William's eldest surviving son, Aymer de Valence, 2nd Earl of Pembroke (c. 1265–1324), succeeded to his father's estates, but he was not formally recognized as Earl of Pembroke until after the death of his mother Joan in 1307. He was appointed guardian of Scotland in 1306, but with the accession of King Edward II to the throne and the consequent rise of his favourite Piers Gaveston to power, his influence declined and he became prominent among the discontented nobles. In 1312, after the Earl of Warwick betrayed him by executing the captured Gaveston, Aymer left the allied lords and joined the King. Aymer was present at the Battle of Bannockburn in 1314, and later helped King Edward defeat the Earl of Lancaster. However, by the time of his death in 1324, he had again been marginalized at court, and also suffered financial trouble. His wife Mary de Châtillon founded Pembroke College, Cambridge and also Denny Abbey, between Cambridge and Ely, where she spent her last days surrounded by nuns.

=== Kings of Cyprus ===
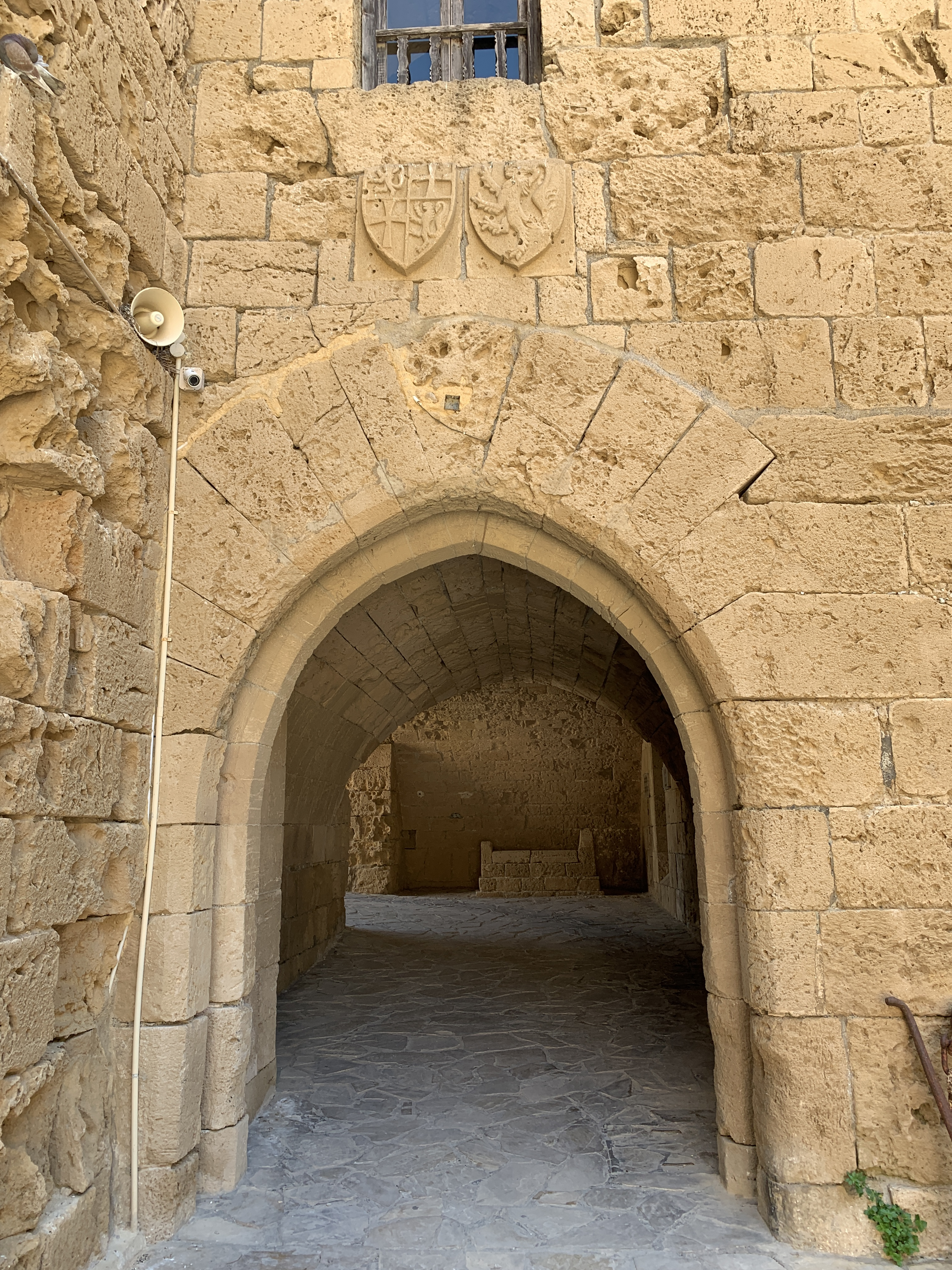
Lusignan coat of arms Detail crests above the gateway to Kyrenia Castle

After another six-year truce with the Muslims, Aimery and most of the royal family died. His only surviving son, Hugh, became King of Cyprus in 1205. The kingdom of Jerusalem passed to Maria of Montferrat, eldest daughter of Isabella and Conrad. Hugh married his step-sister, Alice of Champagne, daughter of Isabella and Henry of Champagne. They had three children. Henry, the youngest child and only son, became king in 1218 at eight months of age; Alice officially served as his regent. Her uncle Phillip of Ibelin exercised the real power behind the throne, followed by his brother John of Ibelin, the Old Lord of Beirut.

Henry was crowned at the age of 8 at Santa Sophia, Nicosia, in 1225. His uncle arranged the early coronation in a political maneuver intended to outflank Frederick II, Holy Roman Emperor's expected attempt to seize power. Frederick succeeded in 1228 in forcing John of Ibelin to hand over the regency and the island of Cyprus. But, when Frederick left the island in April, John counter-attacked and regained control, which began the War of the Lombards. Henry assumed control of the kingdom when he came of age at 15, in 1232. He became regent of Jerusalem in 1246, for the infant Conrad IV of Germany, serving as ruler until 1253. Henry was married three times and had only one child, a son named Hugh. The boy succeeded him upon his death in 1253, at two months old. Hugh died in 1267 at age 14, bringing an end to the first House of Lusignan.

== Second House of Lusignan ==
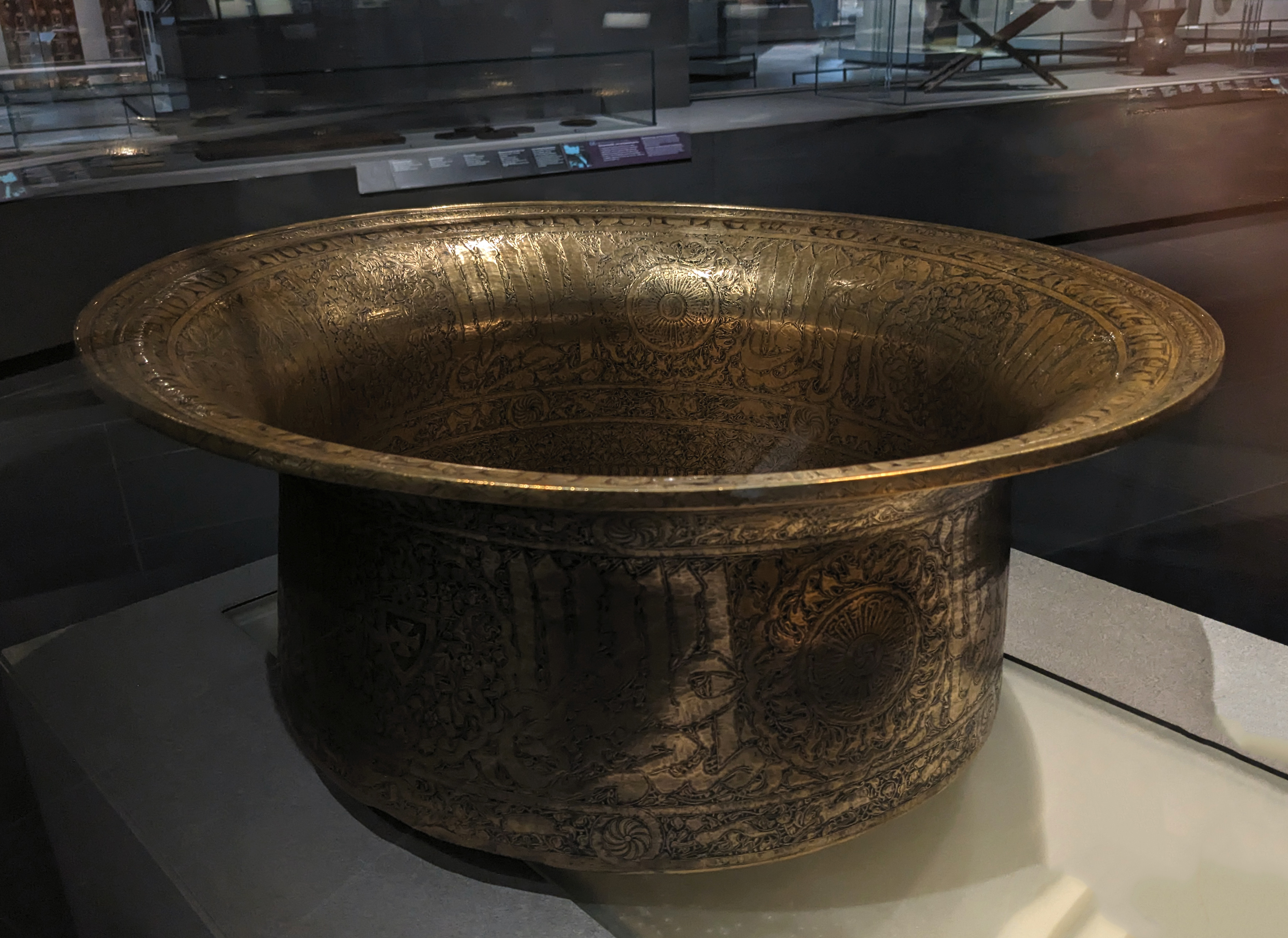
Basin attributed to a commission by Hugh IV of Cyprus. An inscription in Arabic reads: "Made by the order of Hugh, favoured by God, the one at the vanguard of the elite troops of the Franks, Hugh of the Lusignans". Another inscription in French reads: "Très haut et puissant roi Hugues de Jherusalem et de Chipre que Dieu manteigne." ("Very high and powerful king Hugh of Jerusalem and Cyprus, may God maintain him"). 14th century, Egypt or Syria. Louvre Museum

=== Fall of the Templars ===
At that point, Hugh of Antioch, whose maternal grandfather had been Hugh I of Cyprus, took the name Lusignan, thus founding the second House of Lusignan. He succeeded his deceased cousin as King of Cyprus. In 1268, following the execution of Conradin, he was crowned King of Jerusalem. Hugh was frustrated by dealing with the different factions of Jerusalem nobles, and in 1276 he left for Cyprus. Thomas Aquinas wrote On Kingship for Hugh.

In 1284 his son John succeeded him as king of Cyprus and Jerusalem, but died one year later. John is believed to have been poisoned by his brother, Henry. In 1291 the last remnants of the Kingdom of Jerusalem were captured by Al-Ashraf Khalil, the Sultan of Egypt. Henry fled to Cyprus and under his rule, that kingdom prospered. He had the "Haute Cour" keep written records for the first time in their history, and developed them from a simple advisory council into a true court that tried criminals. His goal of reclaiming Jerusalem went unfulfilled, despite alliances with Persia and twice asking Pope Clement V for assistance.

King Henry suffered from epilepsy, which incapacitated him at times. Some of the nobles grew unhappy with his rule, and he had his brother, Guy, the Constable of Cyprus, executed for conspiring against him. Their brother Amalric, the Lord of Tyre, overthrew him with help from the Knights Templar. The revolt was quick and non-violent. Amalric became regent of Cyprus and Jerusalem, and Henry was exiled to Armenia. There he was imprisoned by Amalric's brother-in-law King Oshin. Amalric repaired relationships with Venice, Genoa, and the Knights Hospitaller, and became popular among the people.

In 1300, the Lusignans, led by Amalric, Lord of Tyre entered into combined military operations with the Mongols under Ghazan to retake the Holy Land, but without success. In 1307 Pope Clement, under pressure from king Philip IV of France ordered that all Templars be arrested and their properties seized, forcing Amalric to comply. This led to a small uprising and calls for Henry to retake the throne, but it quickly subsided. Among those arrested were several nobles, including two members of the Ibelin family. Amalric was murdered in 1310 by Simon of Montolif. After this King Oshin released Henry II. With the aid of the Hospitallers, Henry regained his throne. Those who had helped Amalric were arrested, including their brother Aimery, who was acting governor following Amalric's murder.

=== Kings of Armenia ===
Constantin III of Armenia on his throne. "Les chevaliers de Saint-Jean-de-Jerusalem rétablissant la religion en Arménie", 1844 painting by Henri Delaborde.

In 1342, Amalric's son, Guy de Lusignan, was elected as King of Armenia and took the name Constantine II. He was initially reluctant as the regent, Oshin of Corycos, was rumored to have poisoned the previous king, and killed Guy's mother and two brothers. Under his leadership, the Lusignans tried to impose Western Catholicism and the European way of life on the Armenian people, who had a state religion of the Armenian Apostolic Church. The Armenian leadership largely accepted Catholicism, but the peasantry opposed the changes. Eventually, this led to civil strife. Constantine was killed in an uprising in 1344, and the throne passed out of the Lusignan family to his distant cousin Gosdantin; he reigned as Constantine III. Constantine III attempted to kill his cousins, in an attempt to eliminate all potential claimants, but they fled to Cyprus.

=== Golden Age of Lusignan Cyprus ===
Hugh IV de Lusignan became king at age 29, and unlike previous Lusignan monarchs he was content being just King of Cyprus, refusing his son Peter's requests to lead a crusade for Jerusalem. He instead preferred to focus on issues in his realm and was strict on justice. When Peter and his third son John journeyed to Europe he had the man who helped them tortured and hanged, and sent ships to find and imprison his sons. He had a strong interest in art, literature and philosophy, hosting regular philosophical discussions at his summer villa in Lapithos and commissioned genealogia deorum gentilium by the Italian writer Giovanni Boccaccio. In 1347 Hugh's son Prince Peter de Lusignan founded the Chivalric Order of the Sword, whose motto was Pour Lealte Maintenir, the motto of his house.

In 1358 Hugh abdicated, passing the throne to his military minded son Peter instead of his grandson Hugh, the heir apparent. Peter believed that since Cyprus was the last Christian stronghold in the Middle East it was his duty to fight the Muslims, and raided the coastal ports of the Asia Minor. The people of Korikos asked for protection from the Muslims. Peter sent his kinsman, Sir Roberto de Lusignan to lead the siege of Korikos. The Lusignans succeeded, and the various Muslim leaders united against Peter, launching an assault on Cyprus. Peter united Knights of Saint John from Rhodes, Papal armies, and Mediterranean pirates to defeat the Muslim fleets before they could land. After another defeat at Antalya the remaining emirs in the region offered him tribute, and he accepted, sending the flags, coats of arms, and other symbols of his house to be raised in different cities. Peter personally visited many of the cities he conquered, where he was given trophies, gifts, and was even worshiped by some.

When Peter returned to Cyprus he was in risk of losing his throne. Hugh, his nephew who had previously been the heir apparent, went to Pope Urban V in an attempt to be recognized as king. Peter journeyed to Avignon to present his case. Urban sided with Peter, but Hugh was given a high annual benefit as recompense. Peter also discussed another crusade with the Pope, and then decided to visit the other kings and rulers of Europe to strengthen his army. He visited Germany, France, and England, where the Banquet of the Five Kings took place. In 1363 Peter attended the Congress of Kraków, hosted by King Casimir the Great of Poland. In attendance were Charles IV, Holy Roman Emperor, King Louis I of Hungary, Valdemar IV of Denmark, and other lords and princes. Among the issues discussed were Peter's crusade, peace treaties between the kings, and the succession for the Polish throne. While there Peter won a royal tournament, adding to his prestige.

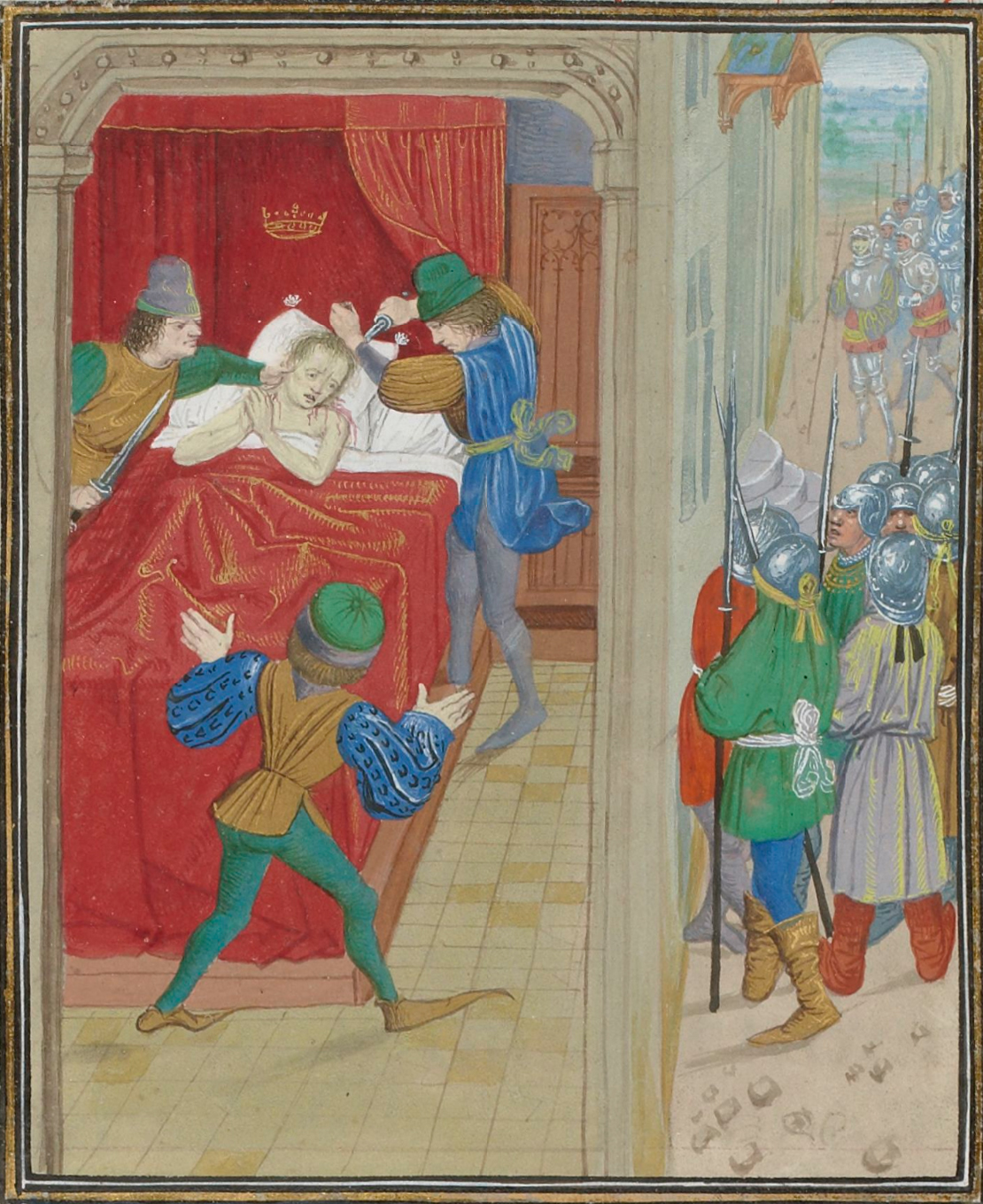
The assassination of Peter. "Assassinat Pierre de Lusignan, roi de Chypre", 15th-century painting by Jean Froissart.

While Peter was attempting to launch another crusade and gaining recognition, his brother Prince John ruled as vice-king in Cyprus and faced many challenges. There was an epidemic in 1363 which resulted in the death of many Cypriots, including their sister Eschiva. The Turks heard that the people of Cyprus were dying and took advantage by raiding and pillaging the villages. During this time there were also conflicts between the Genovese navies docked at Famagusta and the native Cypriots. Peter was in Genoa at the time and negotiated peace. He failed to gain the support of the major rulers but set off on a crusade with what men he had. He sacked the city of Alexandria, but was prevented from moving on to Cairo, whilst angering the Sultan. Peter moved on to Beirut, Tripoli, and in 1368 attempted once again to unite Europe in a crusade. Pope Urban V instead had Peter make peace with the Sultan of Egypt, who was attacking Christian ships in retaliation for Peter's crusade. The increased commerce under Peter's reign led to Famagusta becoming one of the wealthiest cities of its time. It became renowned as a place where the rich could live in lavish surroundings.

While on one of his visits to Rome Peter received word that the barons of Armenia wanted him as king. He returned to Cyprus to find that his queen had been unfaithful while he was away, and he tyrannized all nobles she showed favor to, including his brothers. In 1369 Peter was assassinated while in bed by three of his own knights. During his reign he was known as the epitome of chivalry. He was succeeded by his 12-year-old son, Peter II.

Peter's brother John served as regent Peter II. John's appointment was opposed by many, especially Peter's wife Eleanor of Aragon, who suspected John of arranging the assassination. Vowing revenge, Eleanor asked for military aid from Europe to punish Peter I's murderers. The Genoese agreed, and invaded in 1373, which led to them capturing Famagusta, the most important port in the region. Peter II recalled forces from cities along the Asian Minor to defend Cyprus, resulting in their loss. He signed a treaty with the Genoese, one of the conditions being that his uncle, James, the youngest brother of his father Peter I, be exiled from Cyprus. This ended the war, but James was captured by the Genoese in Rhodes and held captive in Genoa. After the war Eleanor killed Prince John, still under the belief he had murdered her husband. Peter II signed a peace treaty with the Sultan of Egypt, and died in 1382 at Nicosia.

The Parliament of Cyprus decided that James I of Cyprus was to succeed as the new king. However, James was still a captive of the Genoese. While in captivity he had married Helvis of Brunswick-Grubenhagen and had 12 children. After agreeing to give the Genoese more rights in Cyprus, he was released. While he was away Cyprus was governed by a council of 12 nobles. Some of the nobles opposed his return, led by the brothers Perotte and Vilmonde de Montolivve, who wished to be kings themselves. In 1385 James returned again, and succeeded, being crowned in Nicosia. In 1388 he was crowned king of Jerusalem, and in 1393, following the death of his cousin Leon V of Armenia, he was crowned king of Armenia. James died in 1398, and was succeeded by his son Janus.

=== Fall of Armenia ===
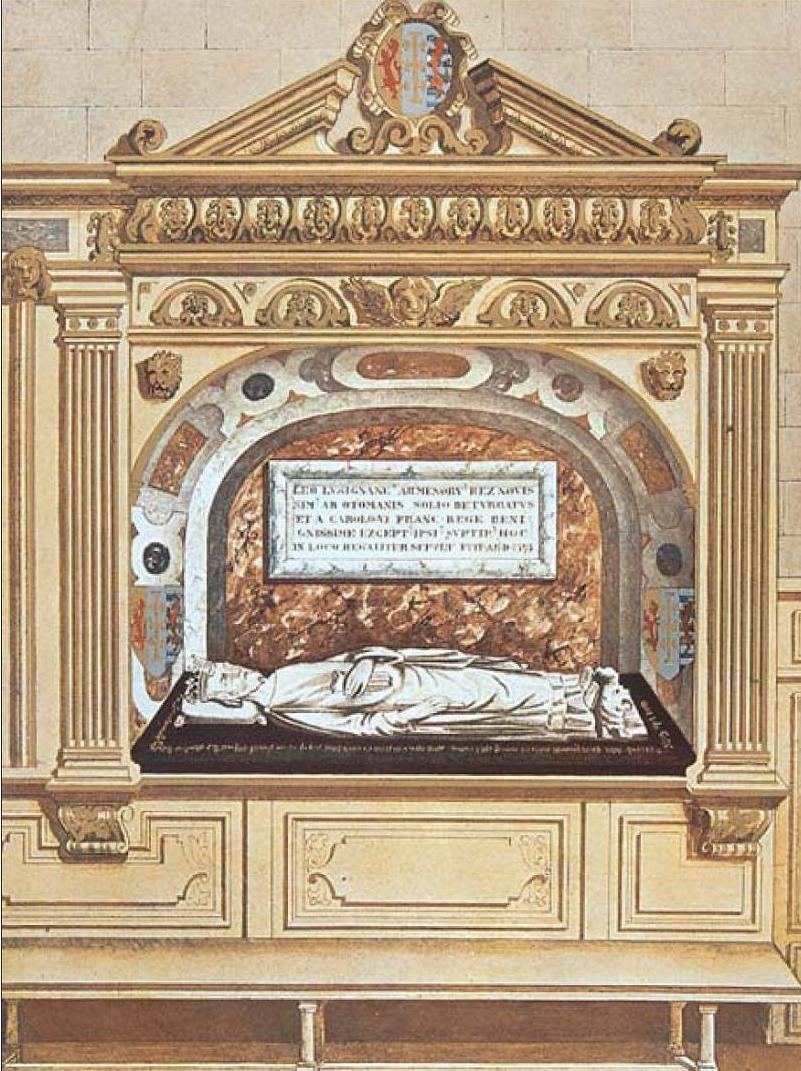
Tomb of Leo V, last king of Armenia, in the Couvent des Célestins, Paris. It was desecrated in the French Revolution and a new one was built in the Basilique Saint-Denis.

After the death of his kinsman, Constantine IV sought an alliance with the Sultan of Egypt, whom Peter had made an enemy. This angered the barons of Armenia, who feared annexation by the Sultan, and in 1373 Constantine IV was murdered. In 1374, Leon V de Lusignan was crowned King of Armenia. He was raised in Cyprus after having fled Constantine III, and while there he became a knight in the Order of the Sword. In 1375, Armenia was invaded by the Mamluk and Leon was forced to surrender, putting an end to the last fully independent Armenian entity of the Middle Ages after three centuries of sovereignty. The title was claimed by his cousin, James I of Cyprus, uniting it with the titles of Cyprus and Jerusalem. Leon and his family were held captive in Cairo for several years, until King John I of Castile ransomed him and made him Lord of Madrid. He died in Paris in 1393 after trying and failing to gather support for another crusade.

=== Kings of Jerusalem, Cyprus, and Armenia ===
Janus, son of James I and Helvis, married Charlotte de Bourbon and their marriage was described as a "cornerstone in the revitalisation of French culture in the Lusignan court that characterised Janus's rule". Charlotte died on 15 January 1422 of plague. She was buried in the Royal Monastery of Saint Dominic's in Nicosia. Her descendants included Queen Charlotte of Cyprus, Queen Jeanne III of Navarre; French kings Charles VIII, Francis I, Henry II, Francis II, Charles IX, Henry III, Henry IV and the subsequent Bourbon kings; Anne of France, and Mary, Queen of Scots.

As king Janus tried to take back Famagusta, which was still held by the Genoese, but was thwarted by conspirators. In 1403, the governor of Genoa, de Mengre, had talks with Janus's representative Giorgio Billi which ended in an agreement by which the cities remained in Genoese hands. Later, he forced the Cypriot people to pay special taxes to assemble an army and siege machines, and besieged Famagusta for three years. This was in vain as there was access from the sea to the city. In 1406 the siege ended and the Genoese tried to occupy Limassol, but were defeated.

Two years later, the island was affected by epidemics. Simultaneously, there were many raids of locusts on the island, which caused destruction of agriculture. A new epidemic arrived in 1419–1420, which probably caused the death of Janus's second wife, Charlotte on 15 January 1422. Because the King was very distraught about her death, the body of the dead queen was moved out of the palace where her funeral was, in order to not be seen by Janus.

Meanwhile, because Cyprus was still a permanent base of campaign for pirates and adventurers, after raids around the Cypriot coasts, Janus had repeated discussions with the Sultan of Egypt via the Sultan's representatives. Janus was unable to stop the raids, which gave the Muslims a reason to attack Cyprus. Cypriot nobles and officials of the kingdom participated in the raids.

Barsbay, the Sultan of Egypt, sent military forces to Cyprus several times. A small force, around 1424, attacked Limassol, and in 1425 the Egyptian army attacked Famagusta and then pillaged Larnaca together with the nearby area, including Kiti, Dromolaxia, Kellia, Aradippou and Agrinou. After Larnaca, they went to Limassol, which was also sacked, including the city's castle.

In the summer of 1426, the Mamluks launched a large-scale attack against the island. Led by Tangriver Mohamed and Inal el Kakimi, their army contained over 3,000 men and included Mamluks, Turks and Arabs and arrived at the island with 180 ships near Avdimou. Limassol was again occupied. Janus mustered his army and moved from Nicosia to Limassol. He asked in vain for help from the forces in Europe: the Genoese were his enemies, and the Venetians and others did not want to destroy commercial relations with the Sultan.

Following the Battle of Chirokitia (7 July 1426) against the Mamluks, King Janus was captured by the Egyptian forces. He was ransomed after ten months of captivity in Cairo. During his captivity his brother Hugh of Lusignan, Archbishop of Nicosia, took charge of Cyprus.

After their victory, the Mamluks pillaged Larnaca again and then Nicosia, the capital of Cyprus. The royal family retreated to fortified Kyrenia and were rescued. The invaders took a great deal of loot and captives before they left the island.

That disaster, together with the previous raids, the war operations of Janus against Genoese, the epidemics and the invasion of locusts, caused the Cypriot serfs to revolt, as they were in utter poverty. The leader of the Cypriot revolutionaries was Alexis, whom they declared as king in Lefkoniko. The revolution was widespread, supported by much of the population, who elected their own leaders in many places of Cyprus.

Meanwhile, Janus was humiliated in Cairo: they took him, tied up with chains and riding a donkey, in front of the Sultan. He was forced to kneel and worship nine times the soil on which the Sultan stepped. Europeans mediated in the case, obtaining the release of Janus after collecting sufficient money for the required ransoms. Cyprus also had to offer the Sultan an annual tax based on income from 5,000 duchies. This tax continued to be paid even after the end of Frankish rule in Cyprus. Together with Janus, some of the captives bought their freedom after their families collected money for ransoms. Those who remained as captives were sold as slaves.

While Janus was captive in Cyprus, the nobles and the royal family members were trying to gain his release, while dealing with Alexis's rebellion. With help from Europe, the rebellion was repressed after 10 months. Alexis was arrested and, after being tortured, was executed in Nicosia on 12 May 1427, the same day that King Janus arrived in Nea Paphos from Cairo. He died in 1432 and was succeeded by his son John.

After the fall of Armenian Cilicia, Lusignan-controlled Cyprus was the only Christian state in the Middle East.

John married Amadea Palaiologina of Monferrato; she died in 1440. After this he married Helena Palaiologina, the granddaughter of Eastern Roman Emperor Manuel II Palaeologus. They had two daughters, the eldest of which, Charlotte. He also had an illegitimate son, James, by his mistress Marietta de Patras. James was made Archbishop of Nicosia at age 16, but was stripped of his title after murdering the Royal Chamberlain. John eventually forgave him, and appeared to be ready to name James as his successor, but died in 1458 before doing so. He was succeeded by his daughter Charlotte.

Charlotte's reign was troubled and brief. She succeeded in building an alliance with the Genoese, via her marriage to Louis of Savoy, Count of Geneva, but it proved futile. Her half-brother James made an alliance with the sultan of Egypt Sayf ad-Din Inal. Their combined forces recaptured Famagusta for the Lusignans, and their blockade forced Charlotte to stay in the castle of Kyrenia for three years. In 1463 she and Louis fled Cyprus for Rome, where they were welcomed by Pope Pius II.

James was crowned king and married Catherine Cornaro in 1468 to establish an alliance with Venice. In 1472 Catherine arrived in Cyprus, and James died several months later under suspicious circumstances. Their son James III of Cyprus died at one year old, bringing an end to the Lusignan kingdoms. However, the last member of the dynasty was Queen Charlotte, who died on 16 July 1487, in Rome.

== Legacy ==
...the Lusignans also accumulated an impressive array of titles that extended their influence almost as far and wide as the Roman emperors had done.

— Paul Sire, King Arthur's European Realm: New Evidence from Monmouth's Primary Sources

Besides the Cypriot branch, through the acts of the Count of Poitiers, Alphonse de Poitiers, by the 18th century the domains of Lusignans were divided among a number of other branches:

- Lusignan-Lezay
- Lusignan-Vouvant
- Lusignan-Cognac
- Lusignan-Jarnac (the Counts d'Eu)
- Lusignan-Sidon
- The principal branch retains Lusignan and the County of La Marche

Two of the Lusignan domains in France were erected into feudal Marquisates in 1618 and 1722 by Kings Louis XIII and Louis XV respectively.

=== "Prince" de Lusignan ===
In 1880, the former Maronite priest Ambrosius Kalfa Narbei, also known as Ambroise Calfa, declared that he was a descendant of Guy de Lusignan and styled himself as the Prince of Lusignan of Cyprus, of Jerusalem and of Armenia. He took the name Guy de Lusignan and the title of Prince. He started offering self-styled chivalric orders. After the death of Guy de Lusignan/Ambrosius Kalfa Narbei in 1906, his wife Marie's lover became the alleged Grand Master and called himself Comte d'Alby de Gratigny. He became involved in a fake art scandal in 1910.

=== Dynastic orders ===
The self-styled Prince of the 1880s sold dynastic orders; in some cases, these are based on actual historical orders associated with Lusignan.

Order of Saint Catherine of Mount Sinai
Purportedly founded in 1063 by Robert de Lusignan, surnamed "bras-de-fer", for knights on the Crusades making pilgrimage to Saint Catherine's Monastery on Mount Sinai.
Order of Mélusine
Purportedly founded in 1186 by Isabella of Ibelin, Queen of Cyprus and Jerusalem. Named after Melusine, legendary fairy wife of Raymond de Forez, founder of the house of Lusignan.
Order of the Sword of Cyprus or Silence
Purportedly founded in 1195 by Guy de Lusignan for the Kingdom of Cyprus.
Order of Saint Blaise of Armenia
Not revived by the prince, but reputed to have been awarded by the Armenian Kingdom of Cilicia in the twelfth century. Saint Blaise was the family's patron saint.

== Castles and palaces ==
=== France ===
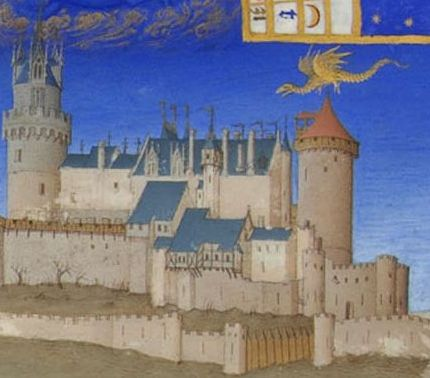
Château de Lusignan in its heyday the largest castle in France

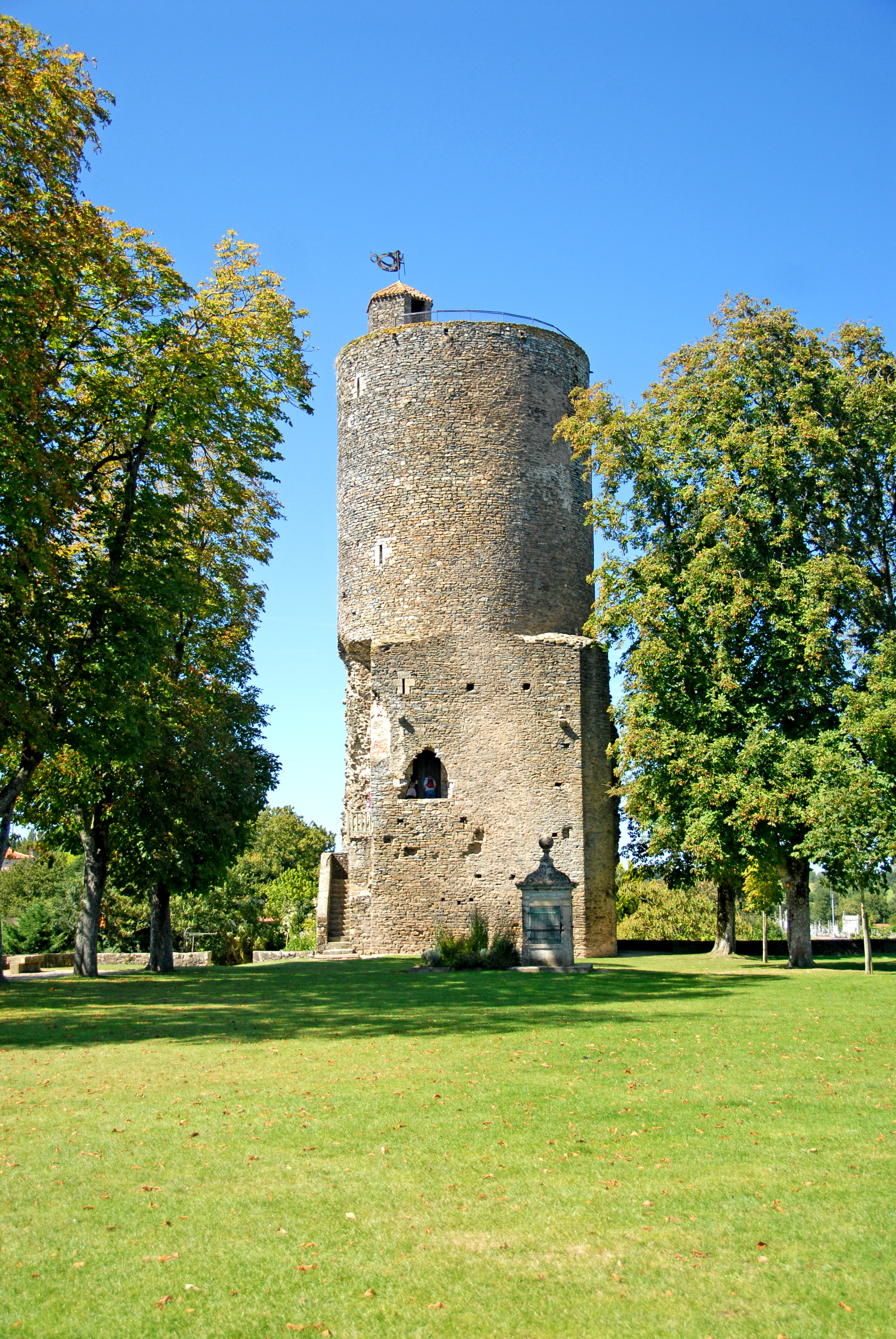
Tour Mélusine, built at the end of the 12th century or the beginning of the 13th century to support the fortified town of Vouvant.

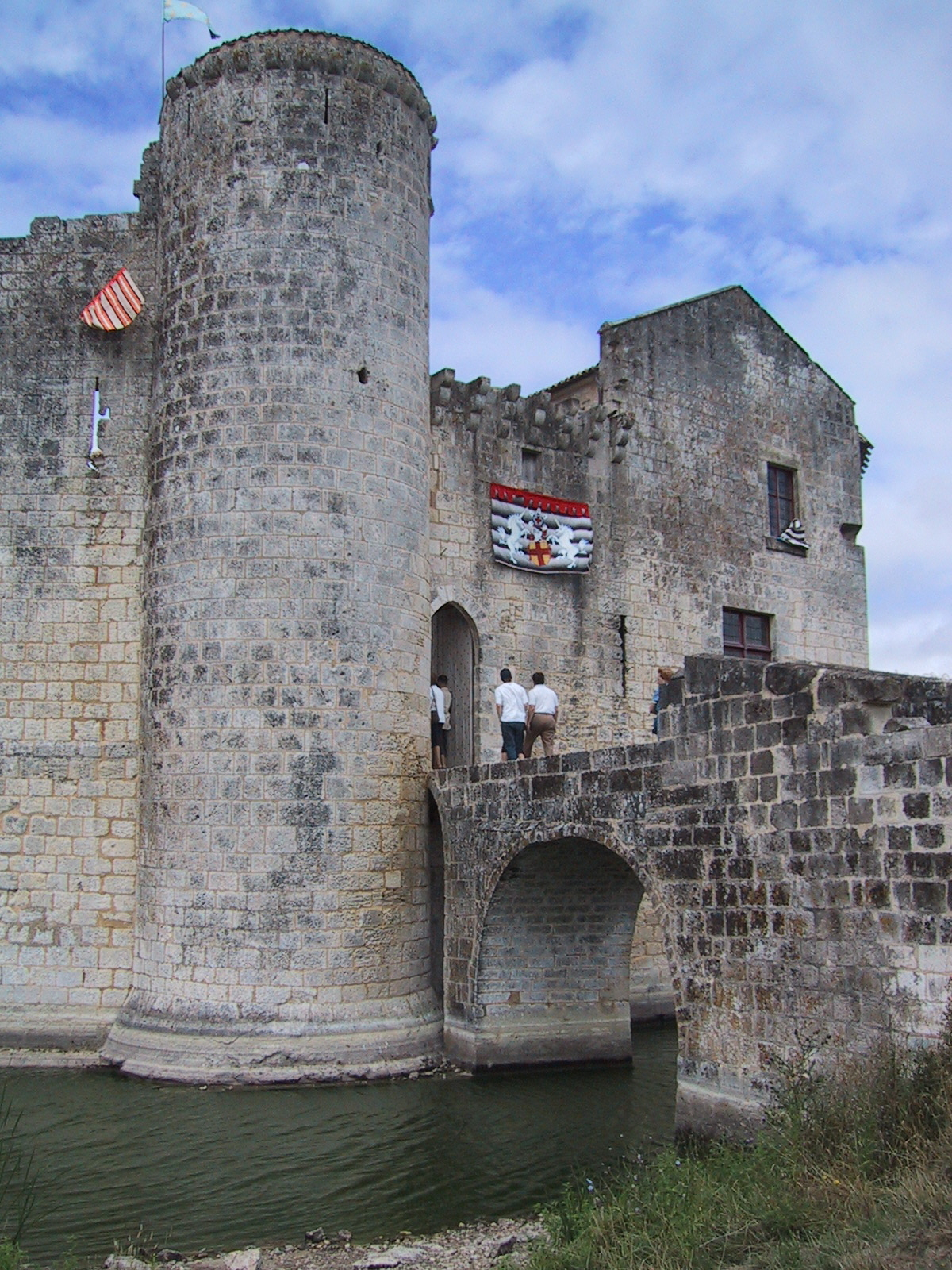
Château of Saint Jean d'Angle

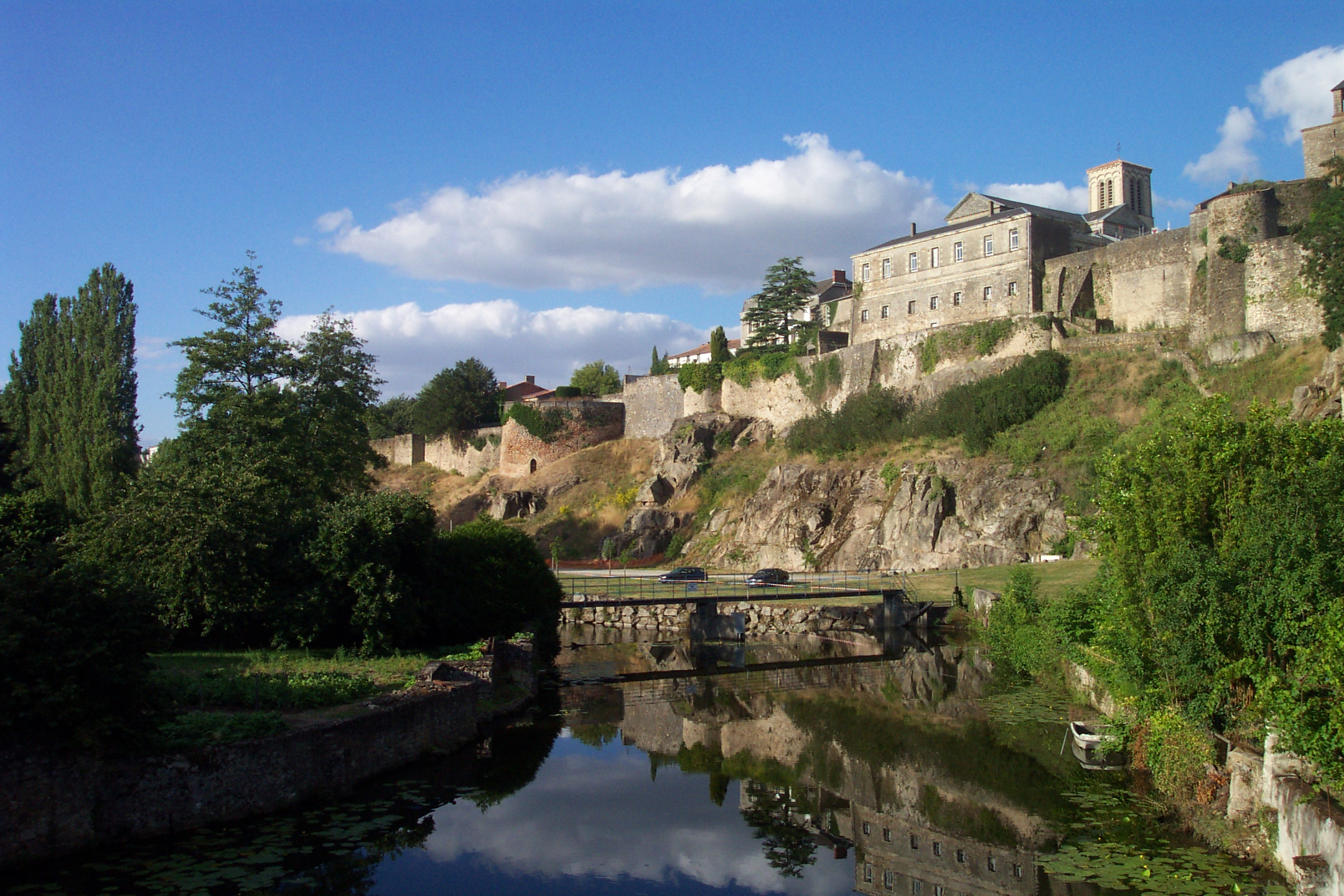
Château de Parthenay

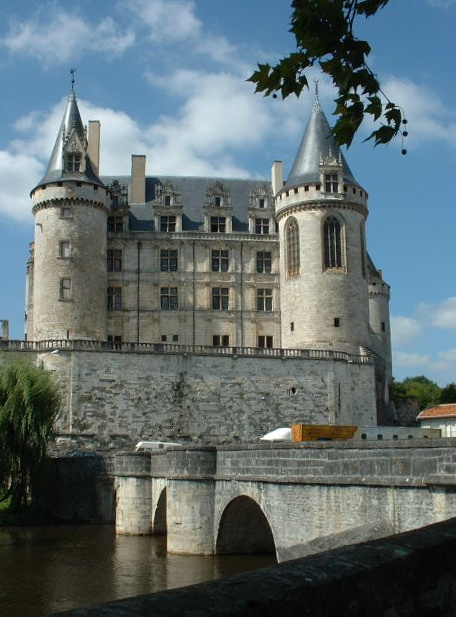
Château de La Rochefoucauld

=== Jerusalem ===
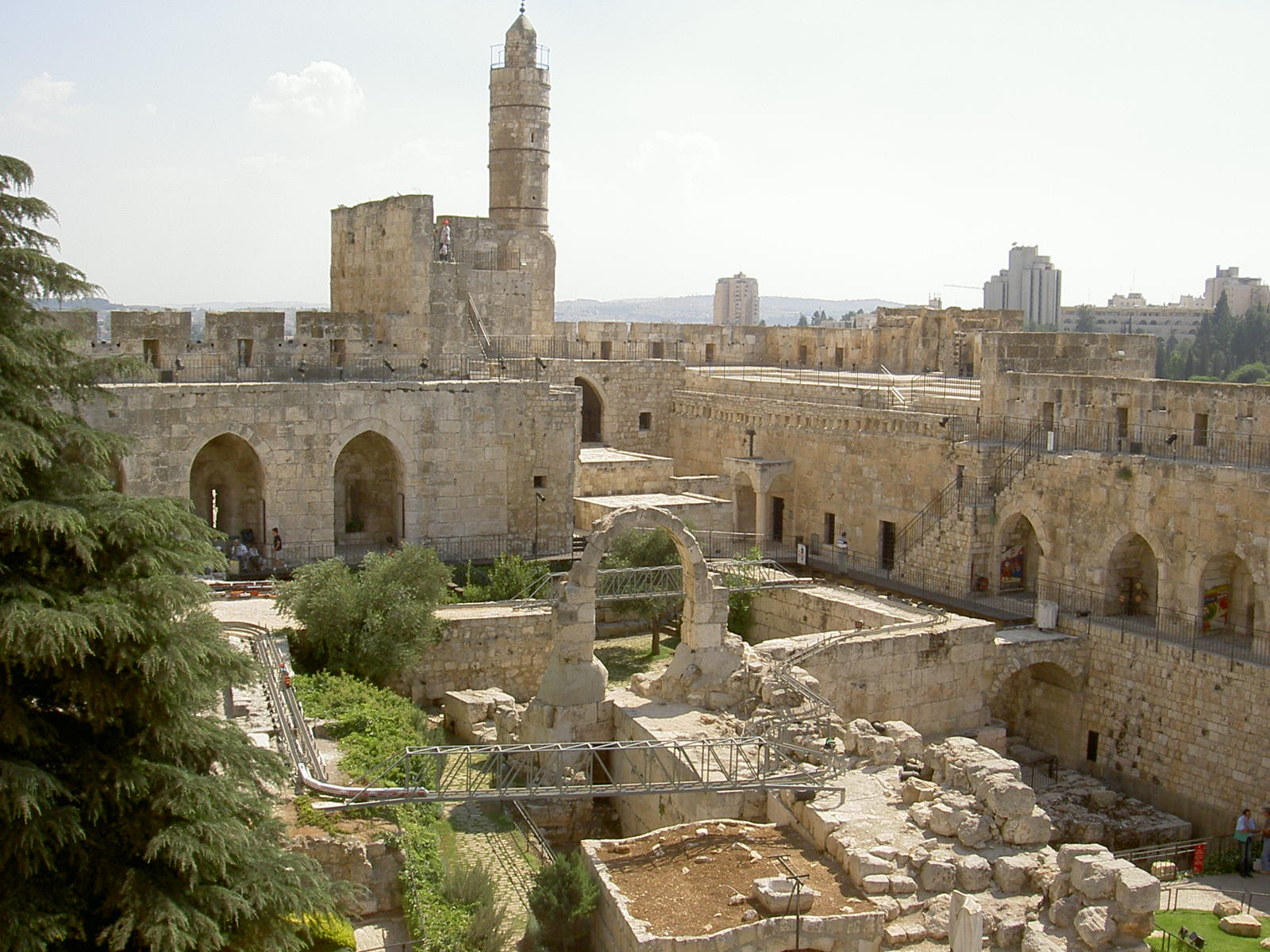
Tower of David

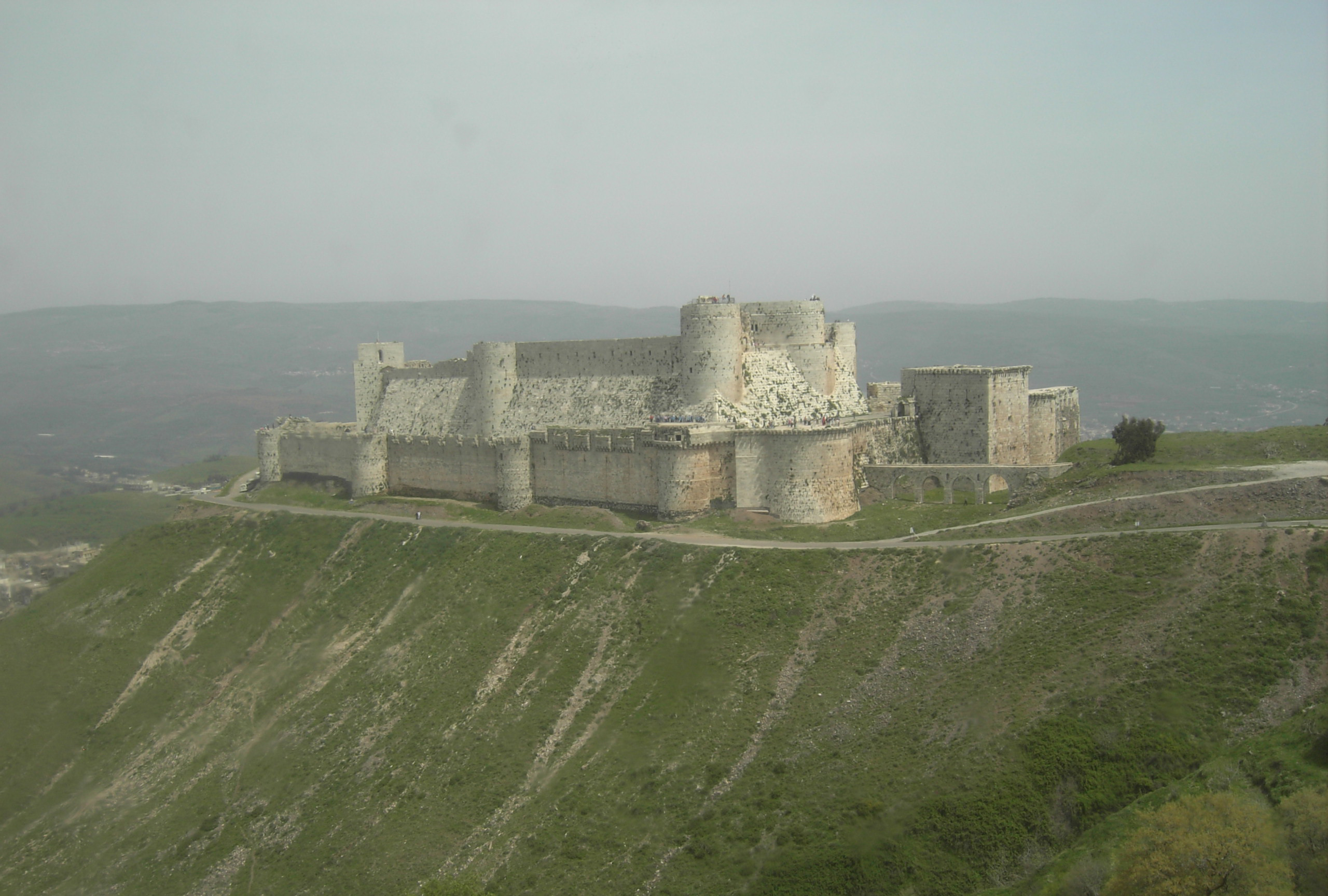
Krak des Chevaliers

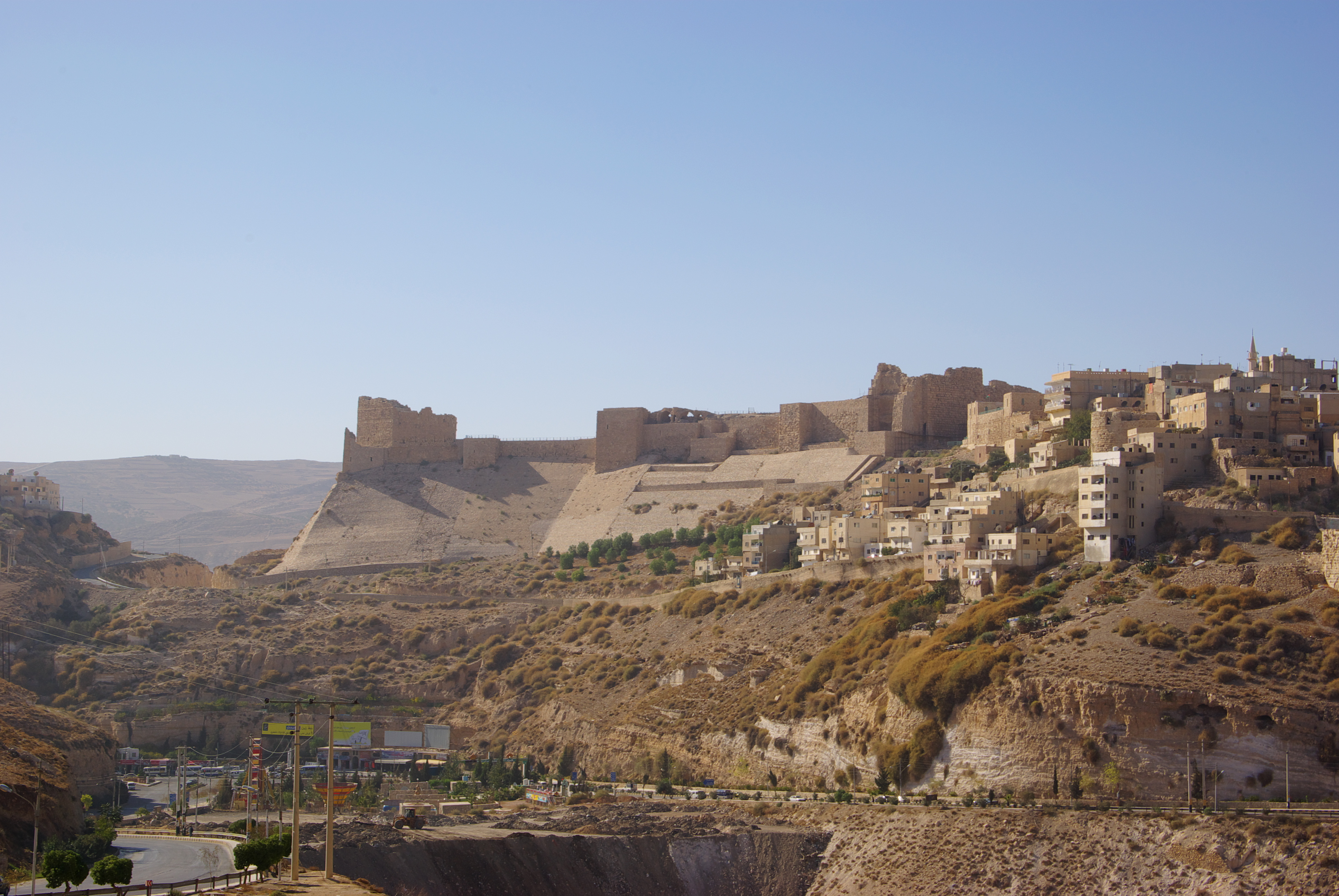
Kerak Castle

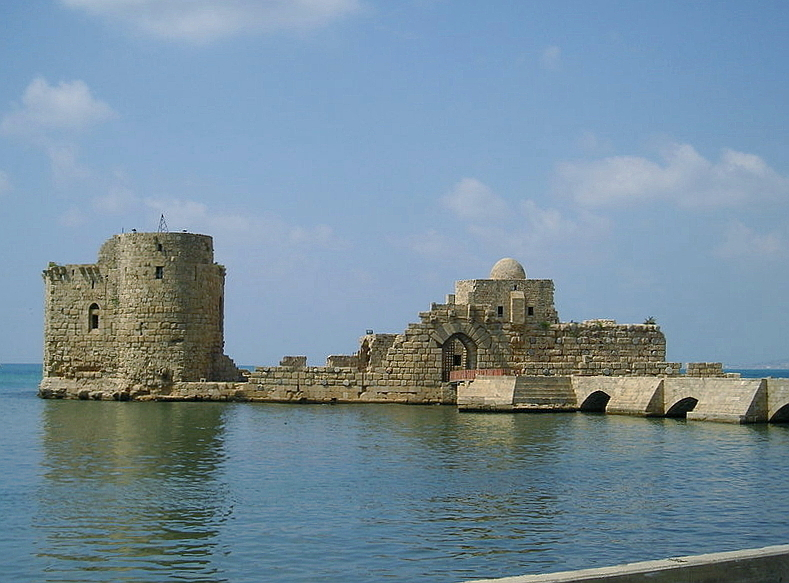
Sidon Sea Castle

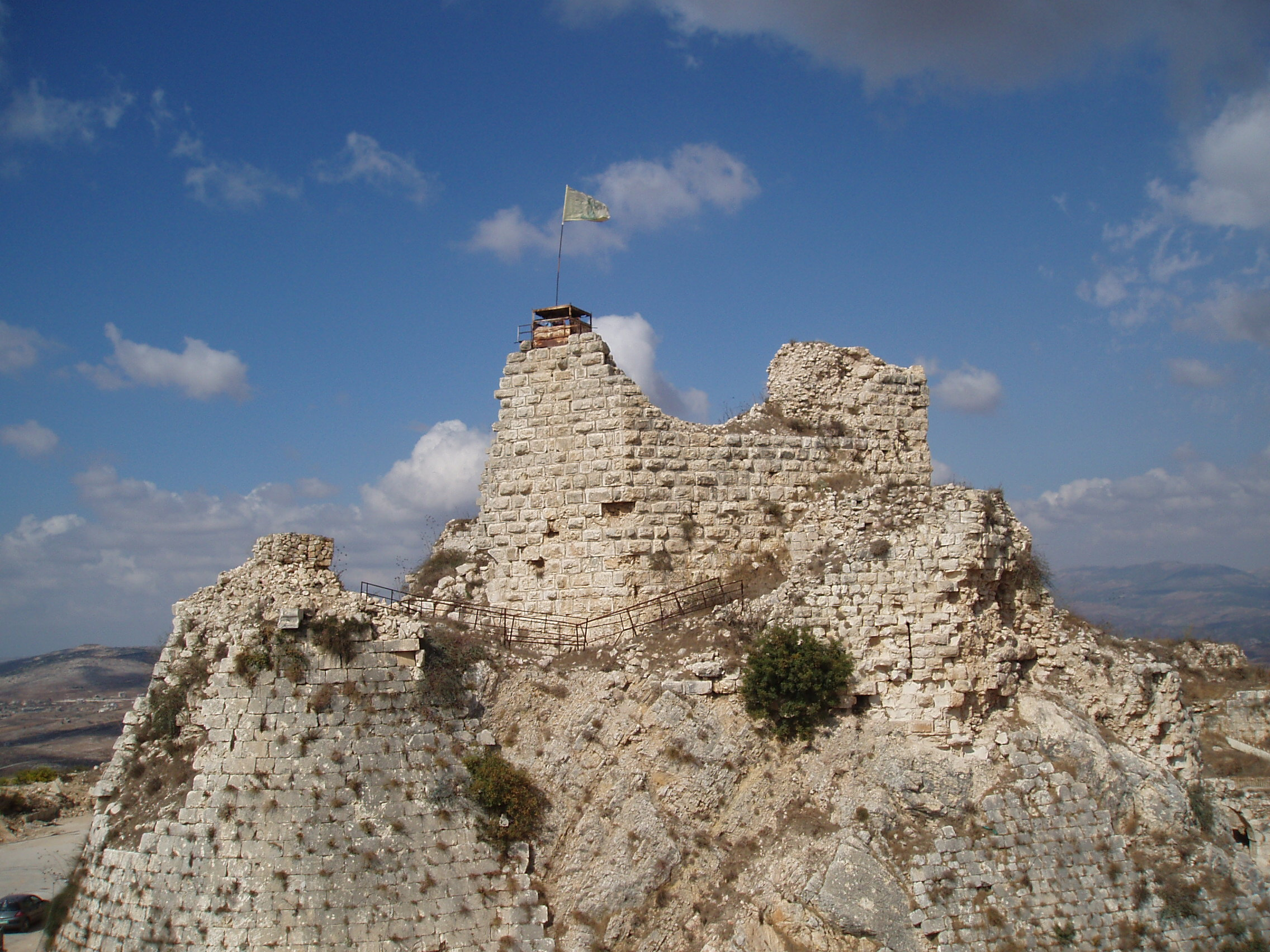
Beaufort Castle

=== Cyprus ===
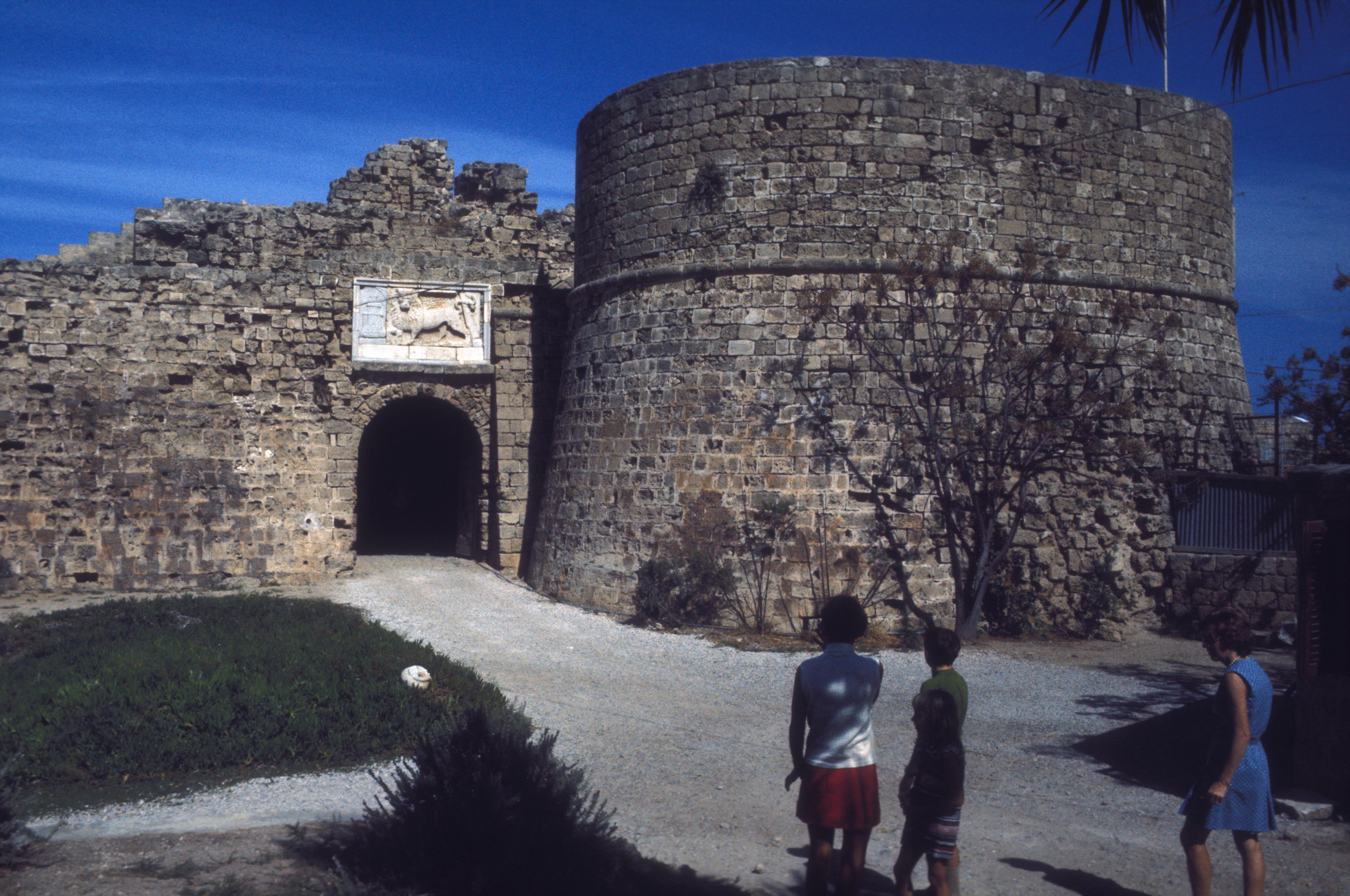
Famagusta Royal Palace

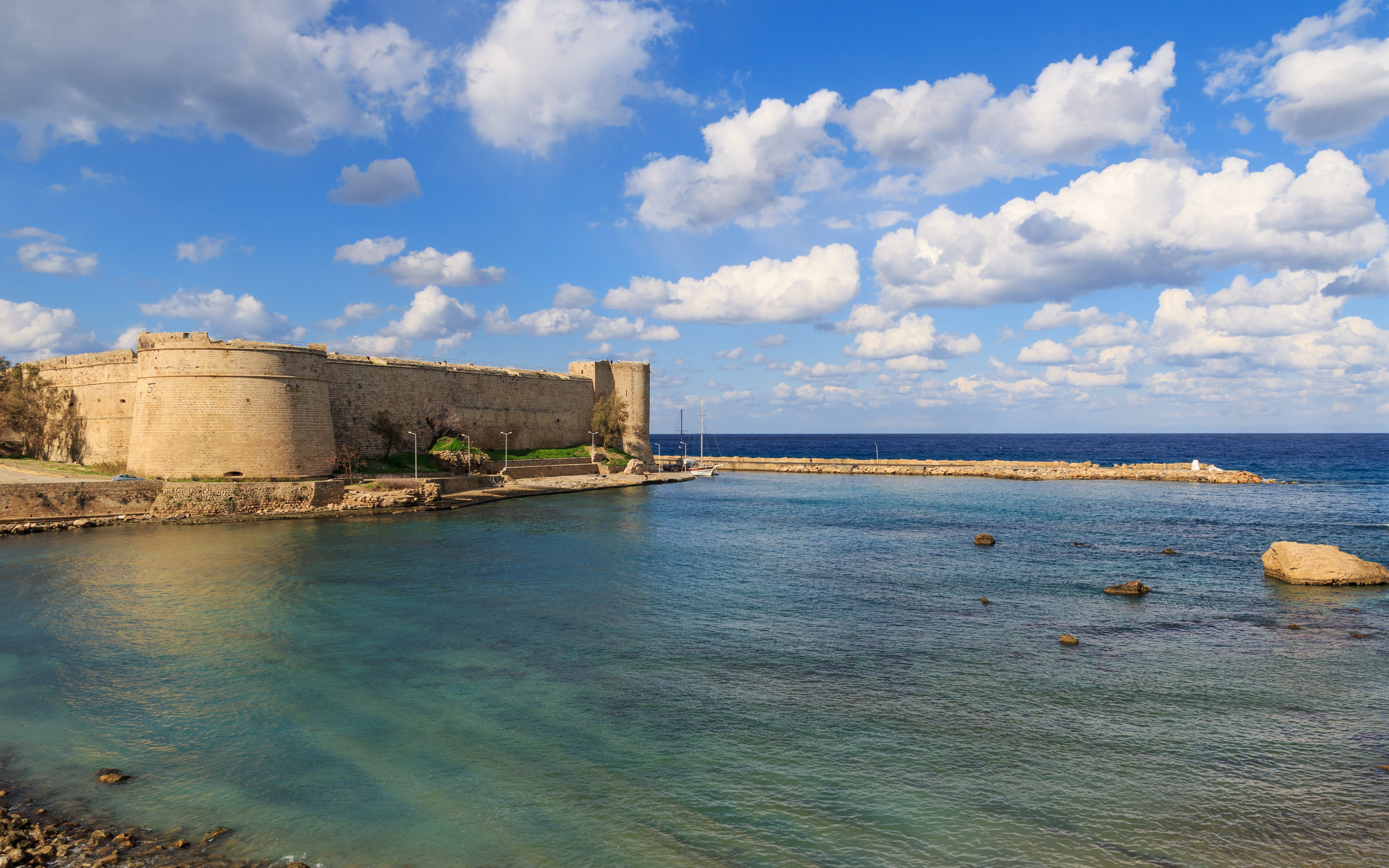
Kyrenia Castle

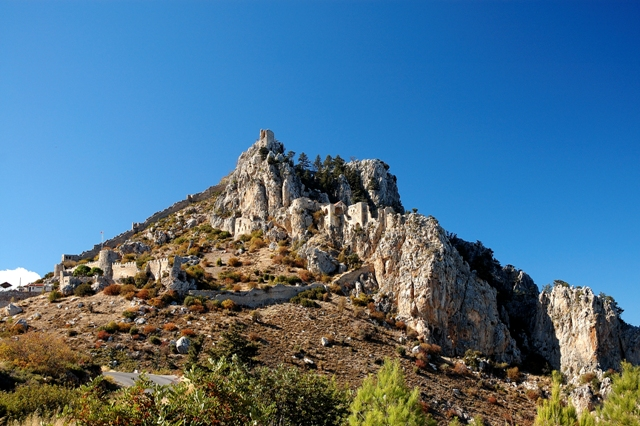
Saint Hilarion Castle

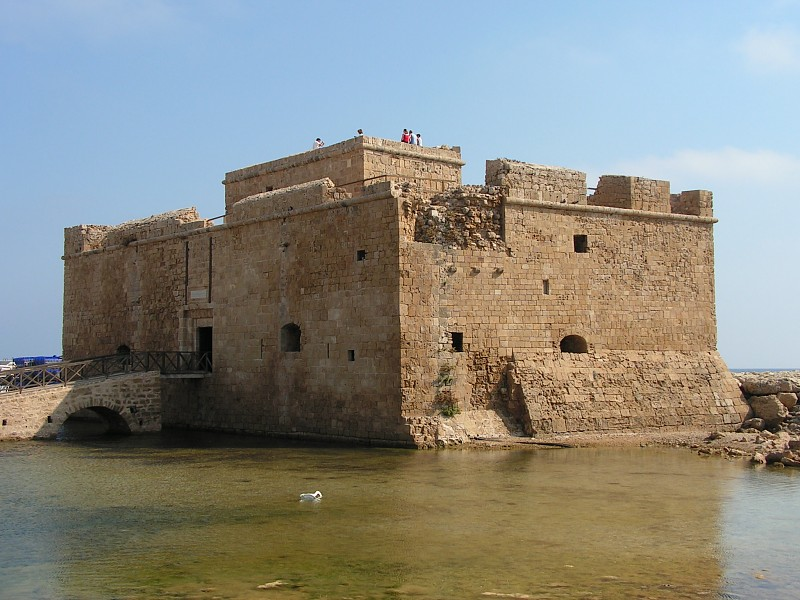
Pafos

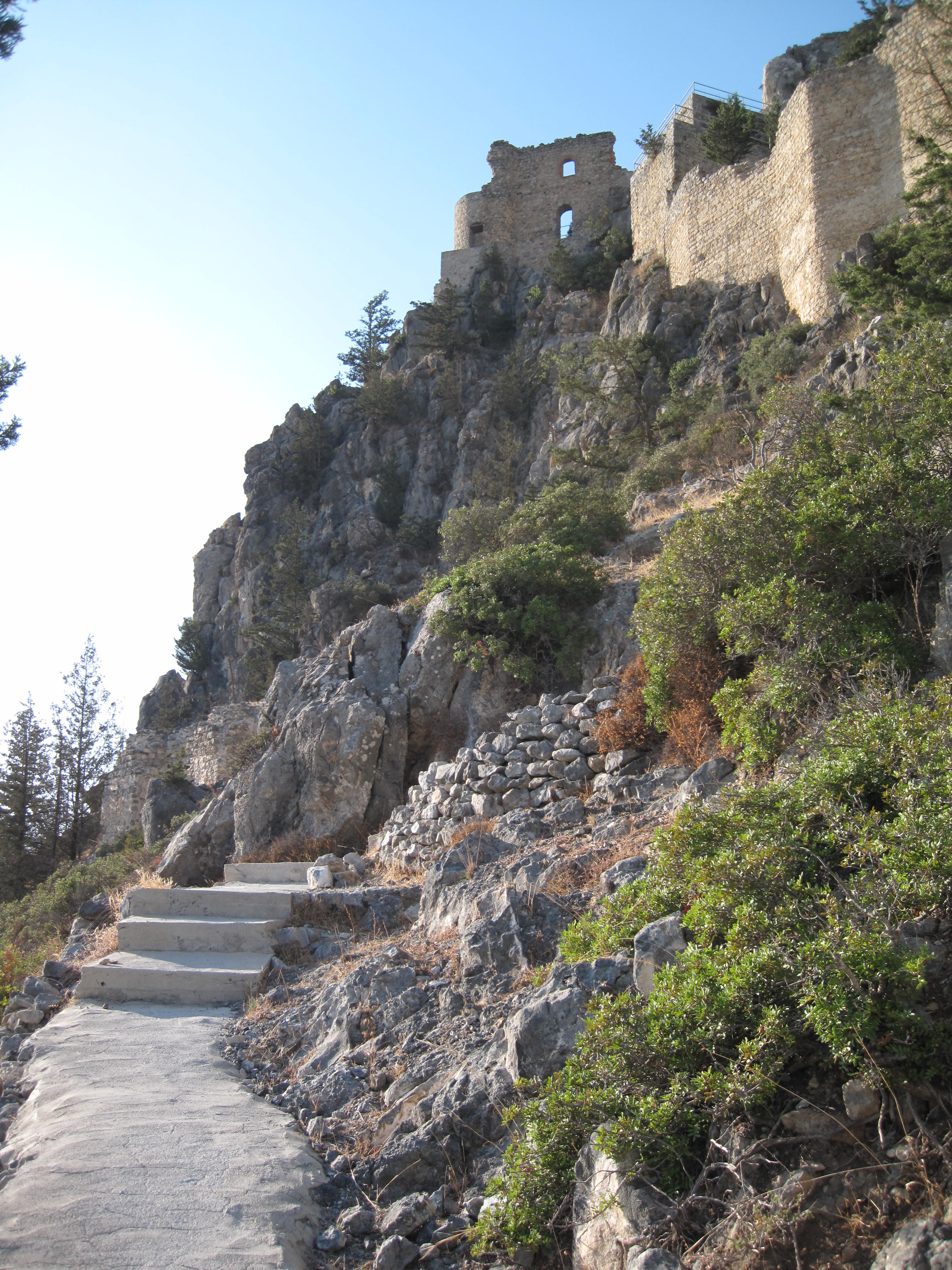
Buffavento Castle

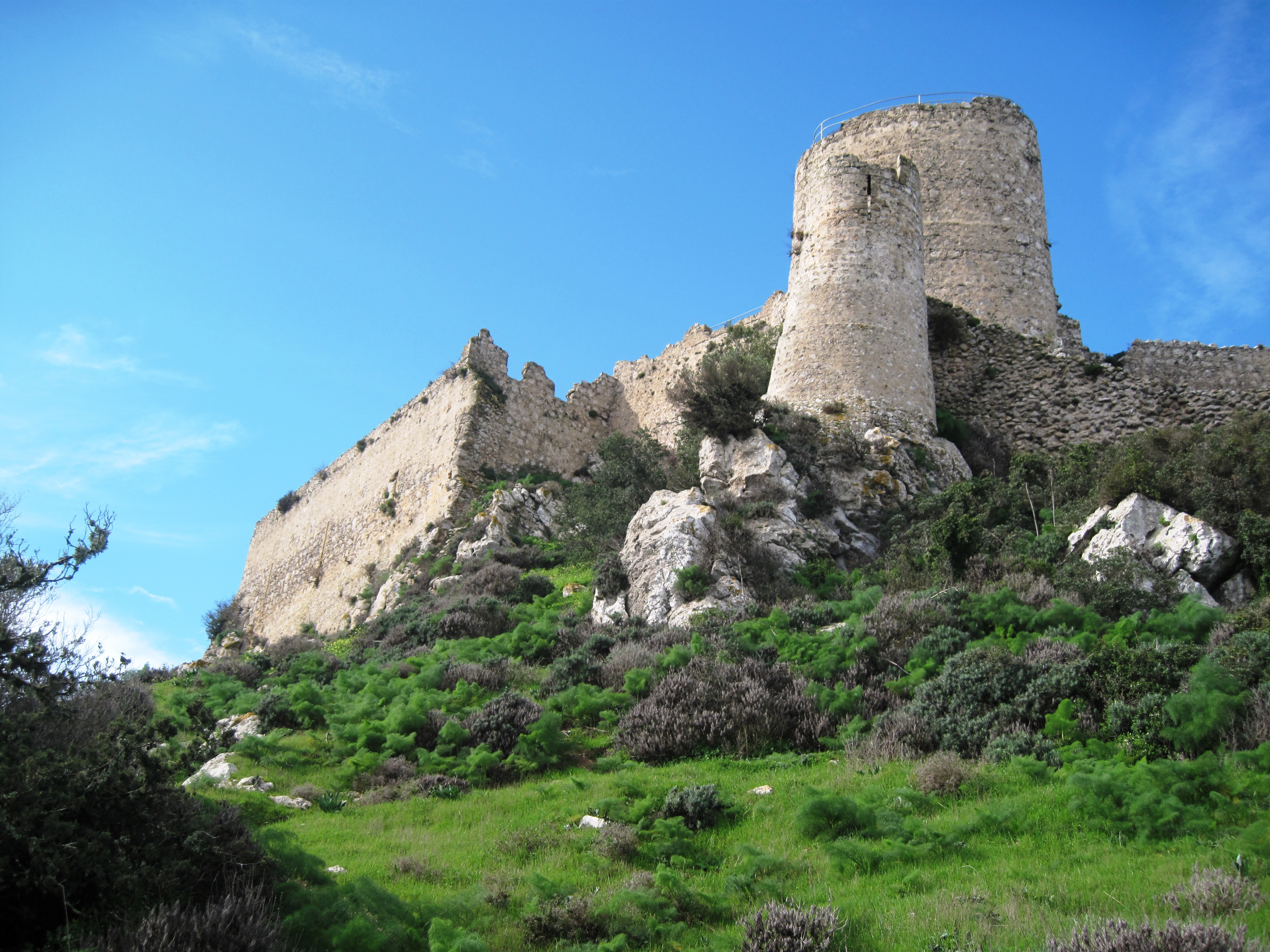
Kantara Castle

=== Armenian Cilicia ===
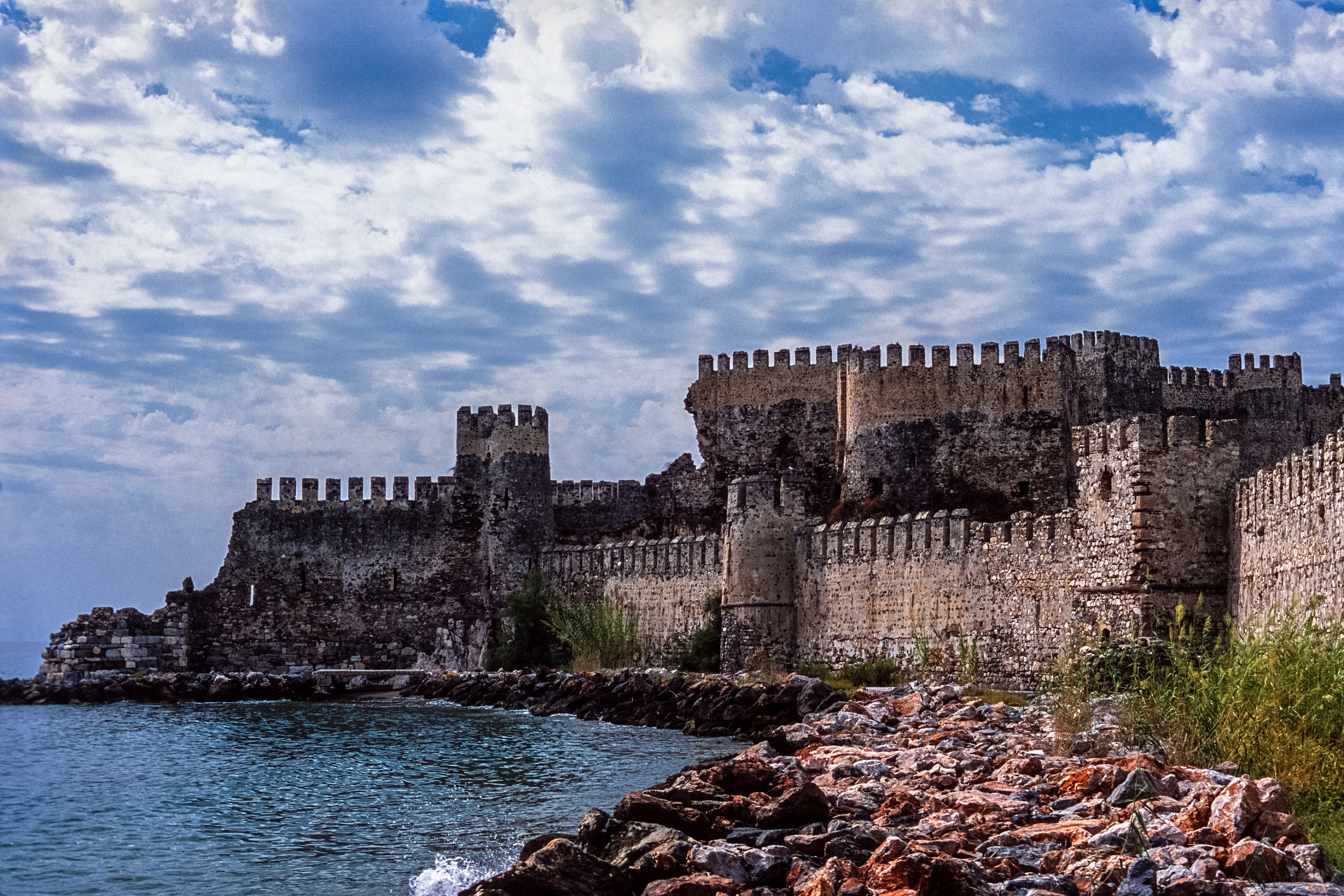
Mamure Castle

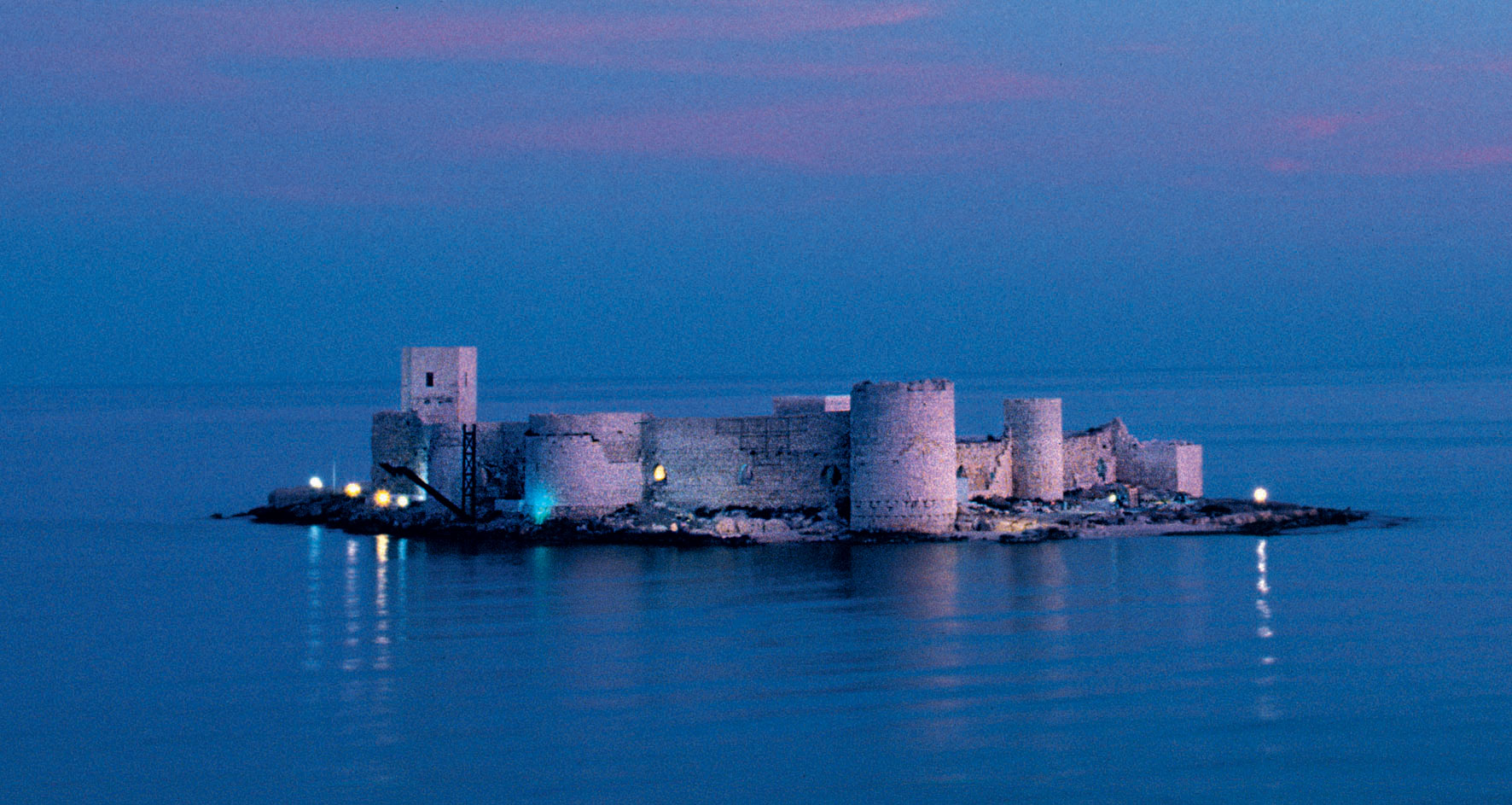
Corycus

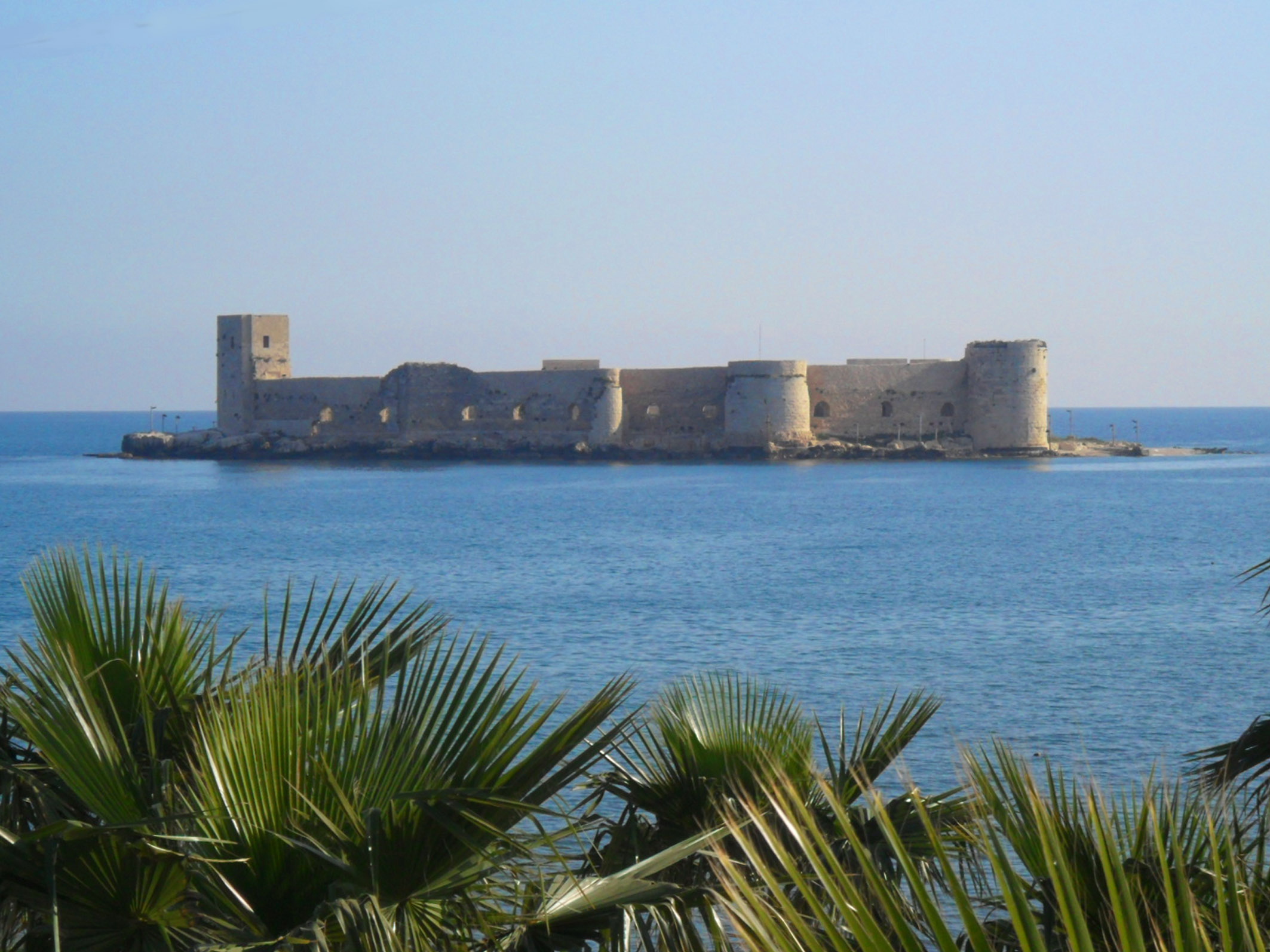
Kızkalesi

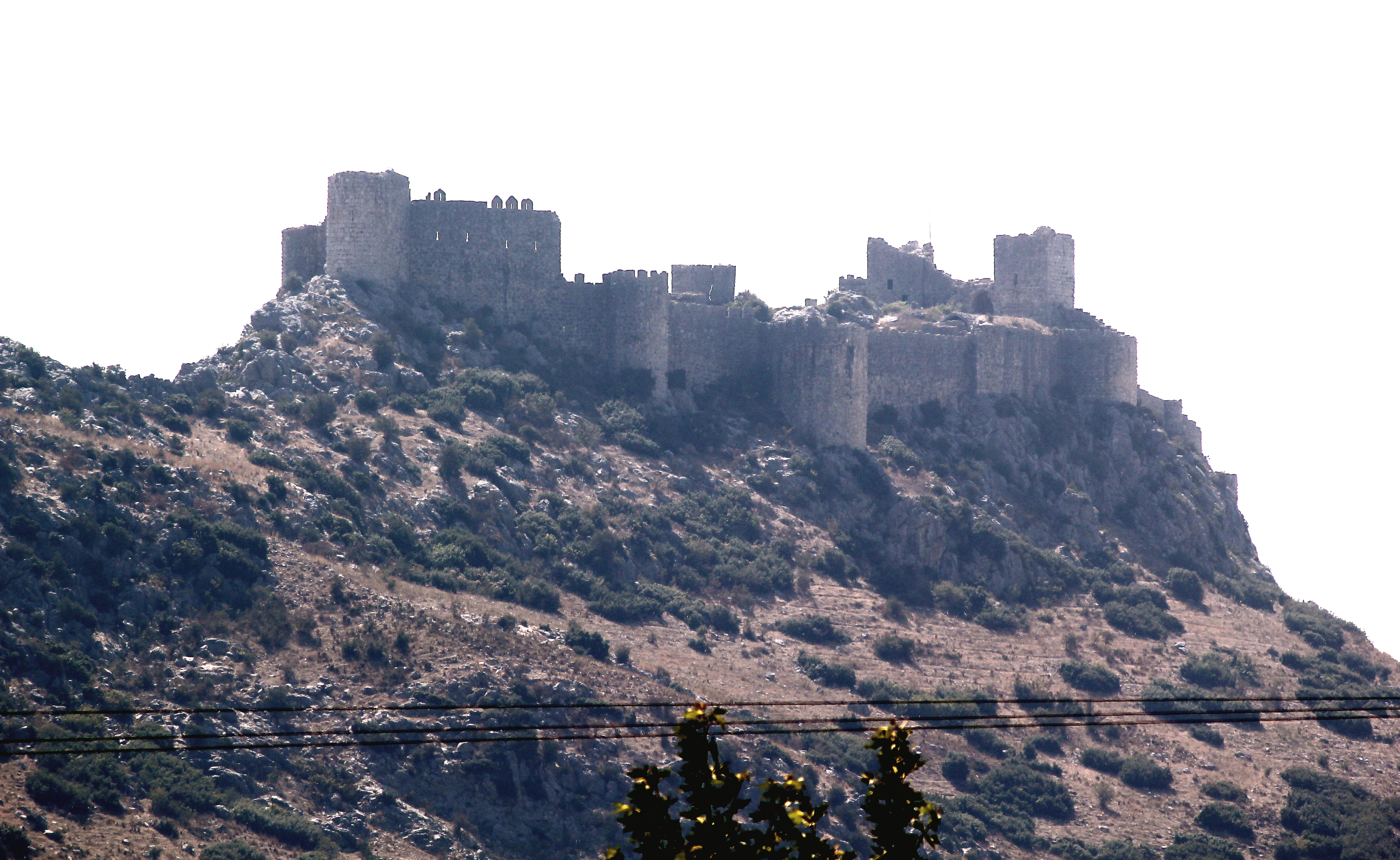
Yılankale "Castle of the Snakes"

== In mythology ==
=== Melusine ===
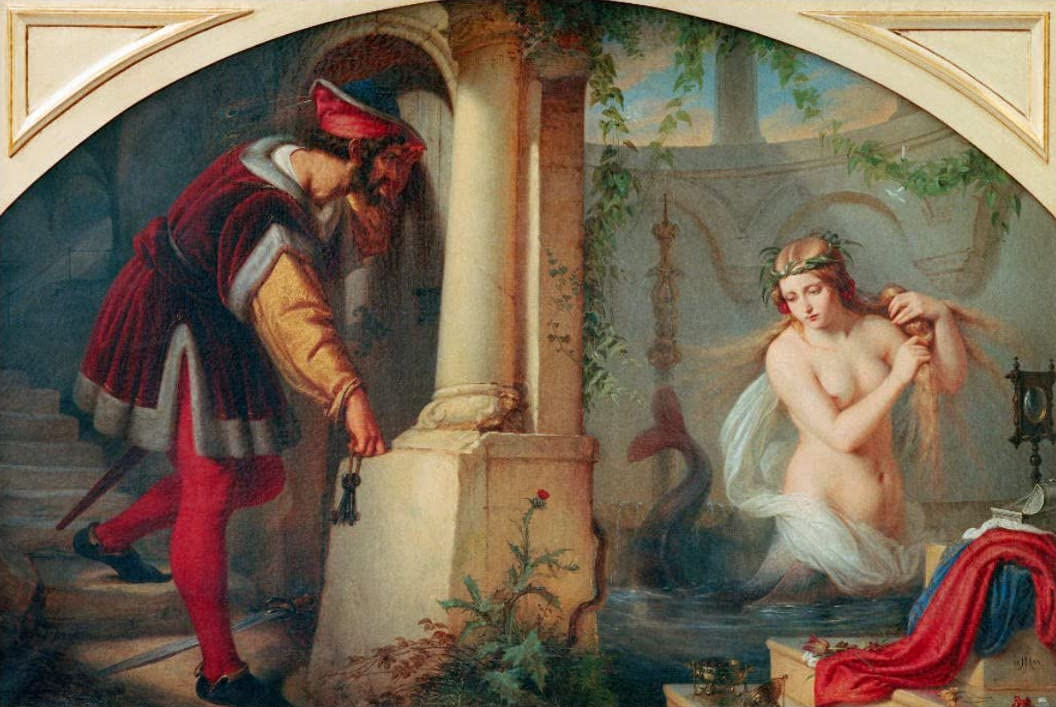
Melusine's secret is discovered. "Die schöne Melusine", 1844 painting by Julius Hübner.

According to European folklore the House of Lusignan was founded by the faerie Melusine. In the legend Melusine was exiled from Avalon and doomed to turn into a serpent from the waist down every Saturday. One day a prince, Raymondin of Poitou, came across her in the woods. He had just killed his uncle in a hunting accident and was distraught. Melusine helped him with this, and he later returned seeking her out. He proposed marriage, and she agreed on the condition that she be left alone every Saturday.

Raymondin agreed, and together they had ten children, founding the dynasty. They built the Château de Lusignan in 15 days, naming it after Melusine. One day Raymondin's brothers asked why she disappeared every Saturday, and Raymondin said that it was a condition of their marriage. One brother spied through the door, and saw Melusine bathing. She was a serpent, or according to some sources, a mermaid, from waist down. He told Raymondin of this, and when Melusine was confronted she wept at the betrayal, turned into a dragon, and flew away. She would fly over the castle whenever a new Lusignan became lord. It is for this reason that a mermaid is the Lusignan crest and dragons were their supporters. These symbols also adorned the family's various castles.

The House of Plantagenet also claims shared ancestry from Melusine.

== In popular culture ==
- King Peter I of Cyprus is mentioned in The Canterbury Tales.
- Melusine, the mythological founder of the family, is used as the logo for Starbucks.
- Kingdom of Heaven centers on the Battle of Hattin and capture of Jerusalem, with Marton Csokas playing Guy de Lusignan.
- The movie Saladin the Victorious by Egyptian director Youssef Chahine features a female knight Hospitaller by the name of Louisa de Lusignan, played by Nadia Lotfi
- La reine de Chypre, 1841 opera by Fromental Halévy.
- Guy de Lusignan is a main character in Decameron by Giovanni Boccaccio.
- Thomas Aquinas's political treatise, On Kingship, was written for King Hugh III of Cyprus.
- Sir Walter Scott, in Minstrelsy of the Scottish Border (1802–1803), recounts the legend of Melusina, a supernatural creature.
- Letitia Elizabeth Landon recasts Melusine symbolically as a female poet in her poem The Fairy of the Fountains.
- The civil war between James II (called "Zacco") and Charlotte of Cyprus forms the historical background to the events of Dorothy Dunnett's novel Charlotte, Queen of Cyprus, and the death of Zacco and its consequences figure in To Lie With Lions, volumes three and six in her House of Niccolo series.

Royal house House of Lusignan
Preceded by House of Anjou	Ruling house of the Kingdom of Jerusalem; 1186–1192	Succeeded by House of Aleramici
Preceded by House of Plantagenet	Ruling house of the Kingdom of Cyprus; 1192–1474	Succeeded by Venetian Republic
Preceded by House of Hohenstaufen	Ruling house of the Kingdom of Jerusalem; 1268–1474	Succeeded by None
Preceded by Hethumids	Ruling house of the Armenian Kingdom of Cilicia; 1342–1344	Succeeded by House of Neghir
Preceded by House of Neghir	Ruling house of the Armenian Kingdom of Cilicia; 1362–1467	Succeeded by None
