= Hugh III of Lusignan =

Hugh III (fl. late tenth century), known as Albus (the White), was the third Lord of Lusignan.

== Biography ==
Most probably the son and successor of Hugh II. He confirmed the donation by one of his vassals of the church of Mezeaux to the abbey of Saint-Cyprien and himself granted the abbey the woodland and the public road between Lusignan and Poitiers. He may have been intimate with the comital court of Poitou, for the Duchess Emma, wife of William IV of Aquitaine, imposed a tax on the abbey of Saint-Maixent and gave him the proceeds. His own wife was Arsendis, and he was succeeded by his son Hugh IV Brunus, not the last of that name in the family.

== Sources ==
- Painter, Sidney. "The Lords of Lusignan in the Eleventh and Twelfth Centuries." Speculum, Vol. 32, No. 1. (Jan., 1957), pp 27–47.

French nobility
Preceded by Hugh II	Lord of Lusignan	Succeeded by Hugh IV
