= Hugh I of Lusignan =

First Lord of Lusignan

Hugh I (est. 885-930) (fl. early tenth century), called Venator (Latin for the Hunter), was the first Lord of Lusignan. He is mentioned in the Chronicle of Saint-Maixent. In later years the Lusignans held the forest from the east of their castle from the Bishop of Poitiers suggest that he held his office from that prelate. He was in turn succeeded by his son, Hugh II Carus who built the Castle of Lusignan.

Hugh I may be the inspiration of the Raymond of Poitou character in The Romans of Partenay or of Lusignen: Otherwise known as the Tale of Melusine.

== Sources ==
- Painter, Sidney. "The Lords of Lusignan in the Eleventh and Twelfth Centuries." Speculum, Vol. 32, No. 1. (Jan., 1957), pp 27–47.

French nobility
Preceded by New creation	Lord of Lusignan	Succeeded by Hugh II
