= Hugh V of Lusignan =

French noble

Hugh V (died 8 October 1060), called the Fair or the Pious, was the fifth Lord of Lusignan and Lord of Couhé. He succeeded his father, Hugh IV, sometime around 1026.

== Marriage and children ==
Hugh married Almodis (990 or c. 1020 – murdered October 16, 1071), daughter of Bernard I, Count of La Marche, through which future counts would claim La Marche. He then repudiated her on the basis of consanguinity and she married Pons of Toulouse.

Hugh and Almodis had:

- Hugh VI of Lusignan
- Jordan de Lusignan
- Mélisende de Lusignan (b. bef. 1055), married before 1074 to Simon I "l'Archevêque", Vidame de Parthenay.

== Conflict ==
When Duke William VIII of Aquitaine, Hugh's suzerain, was at war with William IV of Toulouse, Almodis persuaded Hugh to join her son's side. The duke besieged Lusignan and when Hugh tried to sortie for provisions, he was slain at the gate. He was succeeded by his eldest son, also named Hugh.

== Sources ==
- Coureas, Nicholas; Riley-Smith, Christopher, eds. (1995). Cyprus and the Crusades. Cyprus Research Centre and SSCLE: Nicosia.
- Painter, Sidney (1957). "The Lords of Lusignan in the Eleventh and Twelfth Centuries". Speculum. 32, No. 1, Jan. (1). The Chicago University Press: 27–47. doi:10.2307/2849244. JSTOR 2849244. S2CID 161153870.

French nobility
Preceded by Hugh IV	Lord of Lusignan	Succeeded by Hugh VI
