= Hugh II of Lusignan =

Hugh II (born c. 910-915 - died 967), called Carus (Latin for the Kind), was the second Lord of Lusignan, the son and successor of Hugh I Venator. According to the Chronicle of Saint-Maixent, he built the castle at Lusignan. Hugh III Albus, who emerges from historical obscurity in the next generation, was probably his son.

== Sources ==
- Painter, Sidney. "The Lords of Lusignan in the Eleventh and Twelfth Centuries." Speculum, Vol. 32, No. 1 (Jan., 1957), pp 27–47.

French nobility
Preceded by Hugh I	Lord of Lusignan	Succeeded by Hugh III
