= Tour Mélusine =

Coordinates: 46°34′25″N 0°46′20″W

Mélusine tower
- Tour Mélusine (French)
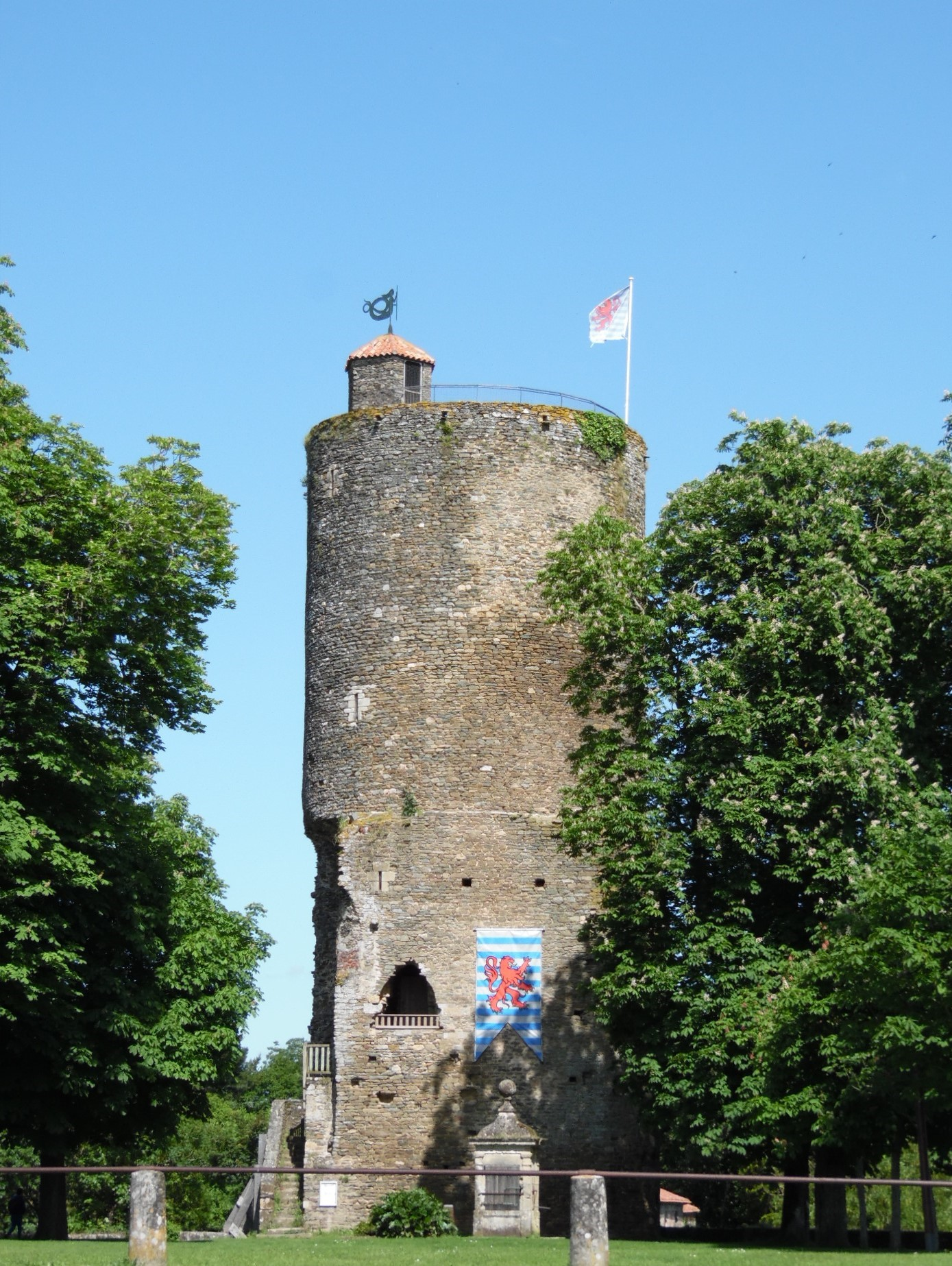
- The Tour Mélusine

- Location within France
- Location: Place du Bail; 85120 Vouvant

History
- Built: End of the 12th or beginning of 13th century

Site notes
- Height: 45 m (148 ft)
- Governing body: Town of Vouvant

Monument historique
- Official name: Enceinte fortifiée de Vouvant
- Designated: 1927

The Tour Mélusine is the keep of a former castle in the commune of Vouvant in the département of Vendée in France.

== History ==
This keep and watchtower, built at the end of the 12th century or the beginning of the 13th century (very often dated 1242, even if this is probably wrong because of architectural techniques and features), is the only vestige of the ancient castle of the Lords of Lusignan built in the present location of the "Place du Bail". This castle was separated from the fortified town of Vouvant by a moat. A chapel, long gone, was leaning against the tower.

Like all of the Lusignan's castles, legend holds that it was built in a single night by the fairy Melusine "de trois dornées de pierres et d'une goulée d'Ève" ("from three apronfuls of stones and a mouthful of water").

This tower, 45 m high from the ditch and with its cylindrical shape, is original from that time. Indeed, the majority of the castles of this region and of this time are of the "Niortais" style (a square tower with round towers at each corner).

The keep has a square base, which indicates the height of the curtain wall that surrounded the courtyard of the castle, which is today the Place du Bail ("bail" meaning "fortified enclosure").

The tower has been protected as a monument historique by the French Ministry of Culture since 1927.

== Architecture ==
The Tour Mélusine consists of a total of five levels:

- The ground floor of the tower was used as a cellar for storing food supplies. It is not accessible to the public.
- The second level was originally accessible by a mobile ladder, now replaced by a stone staircase.
- The third and fourth levels are accessible by a metal staircase (previously made of stone) and each has a vaulted dome. The third level allowed access to the wall walk.
- The fifth and final level corresponds to the terrace at the top, hence a view of the fortified city, the forest of Mervent-Vouvant and the surroundings is impressive.

== Gallery ==
The Tour Mélusine
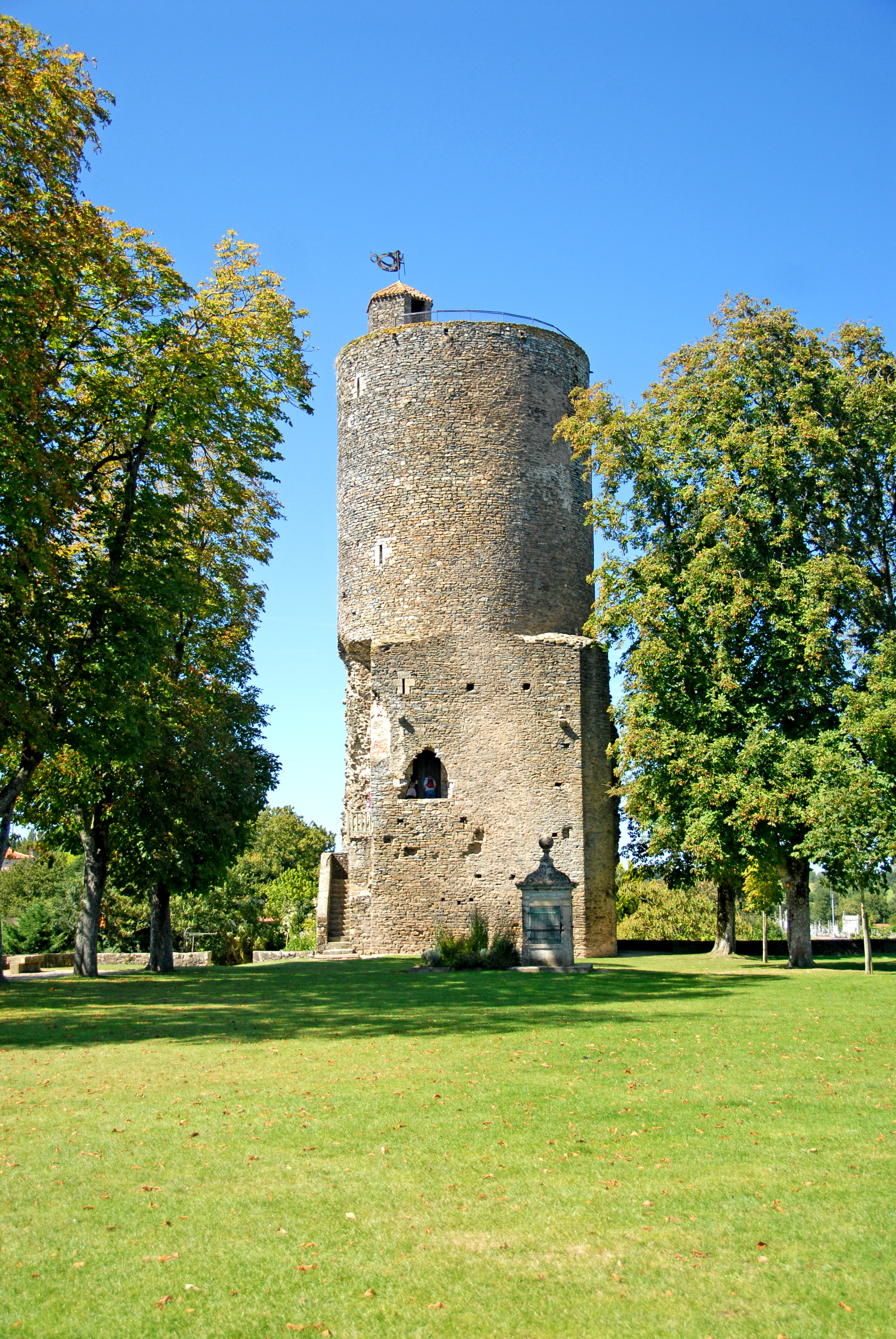
View from the "place du Bail"

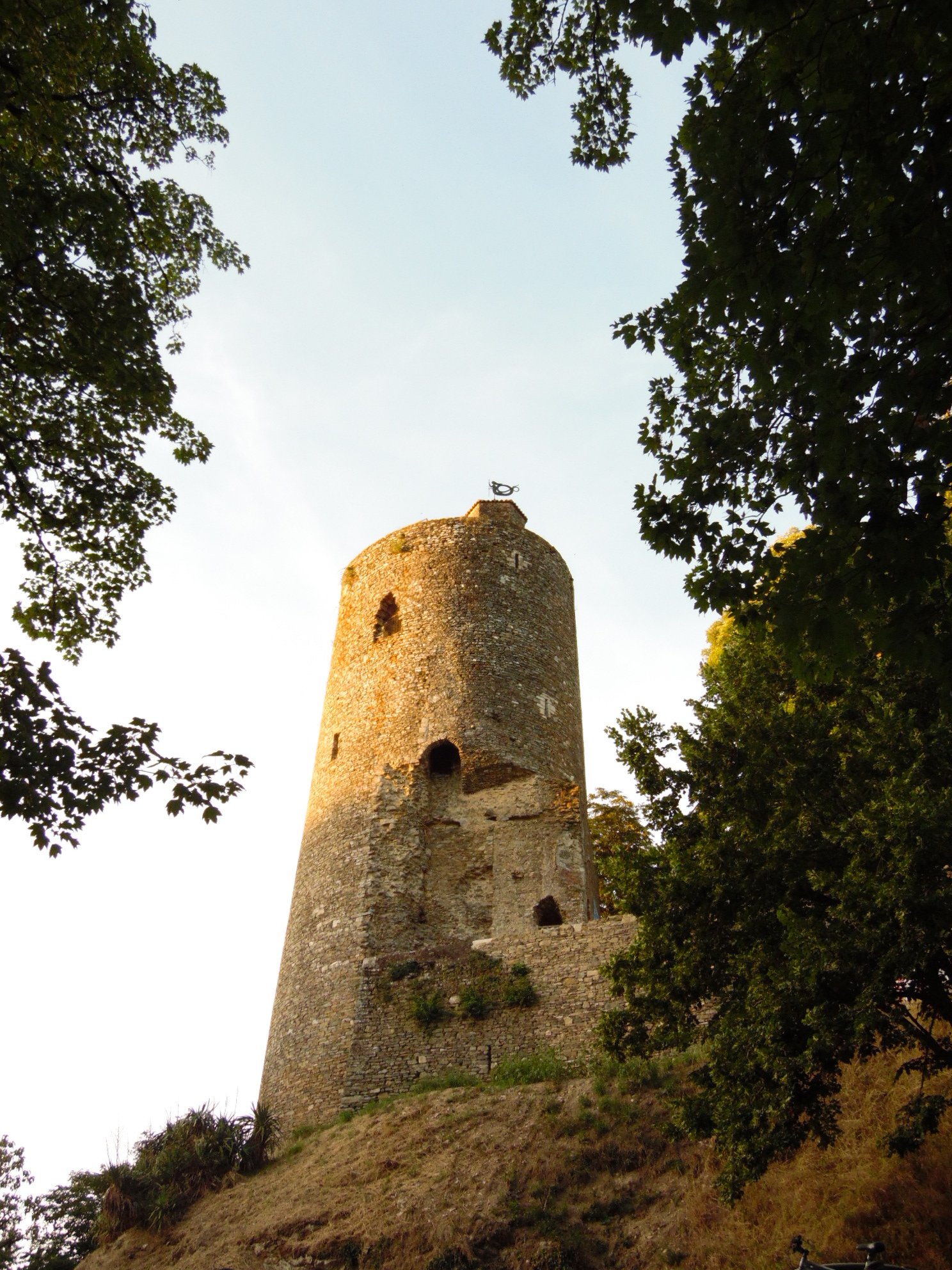
View from the west moat

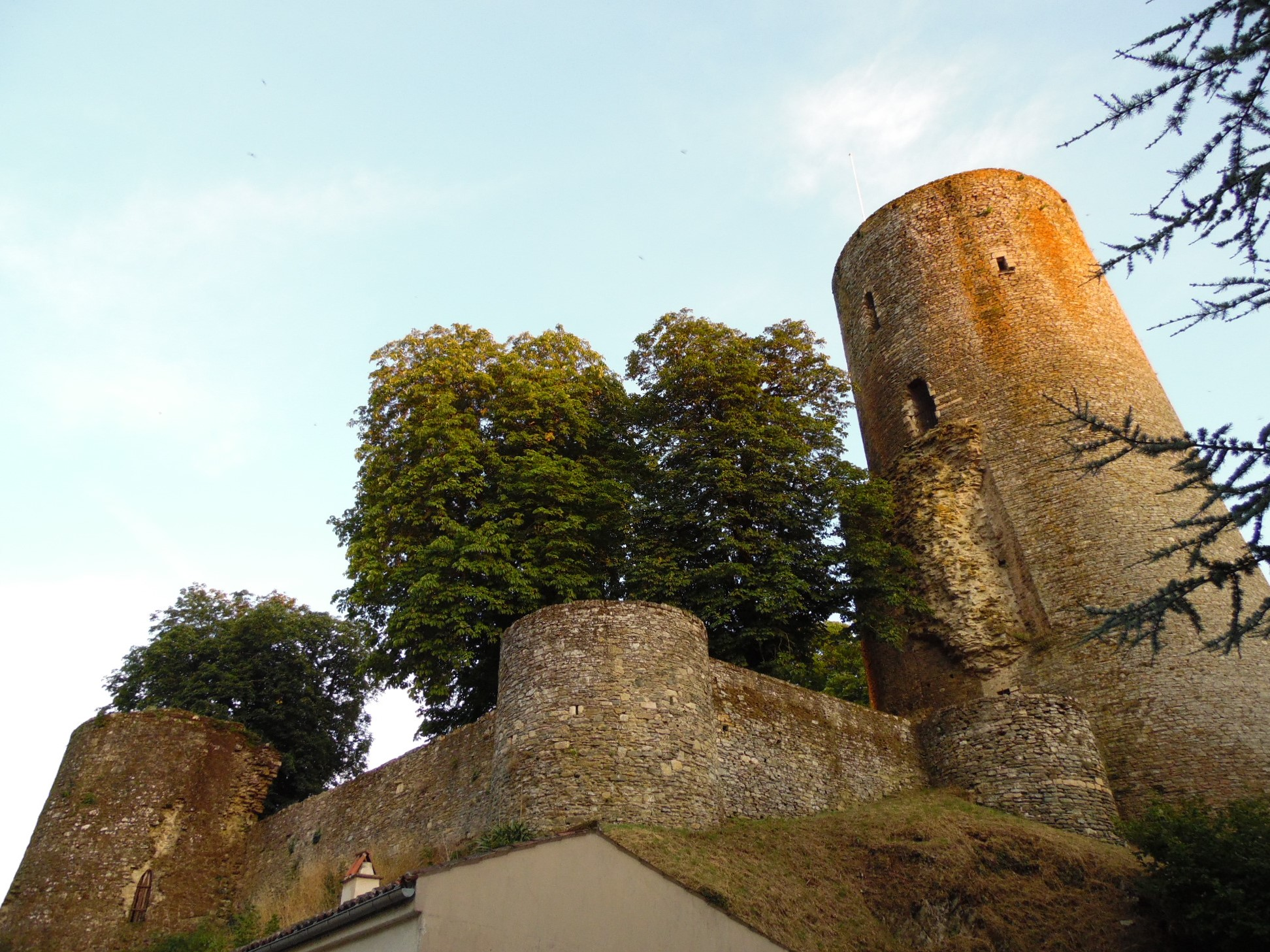
View from the north moat

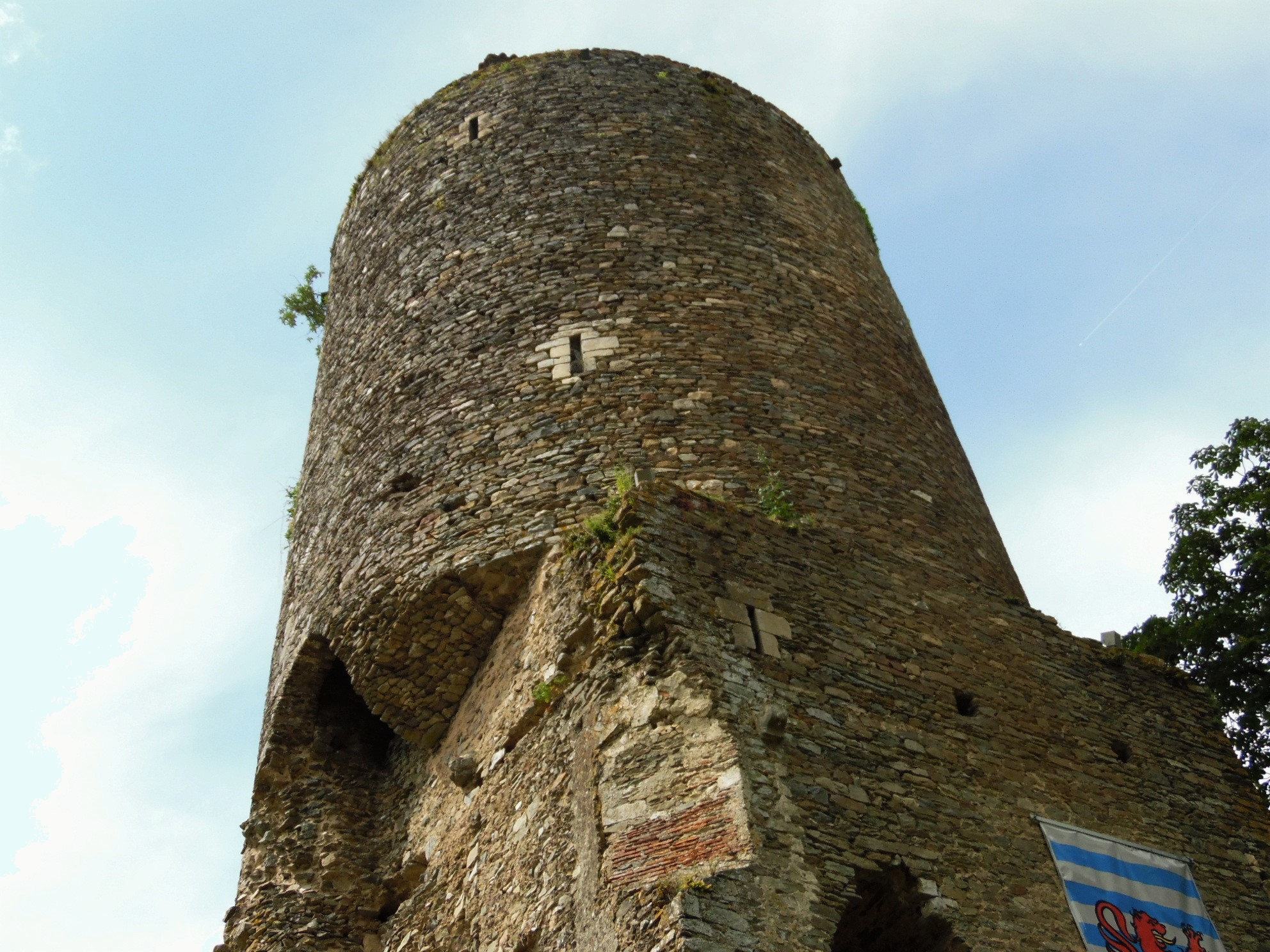
View below it

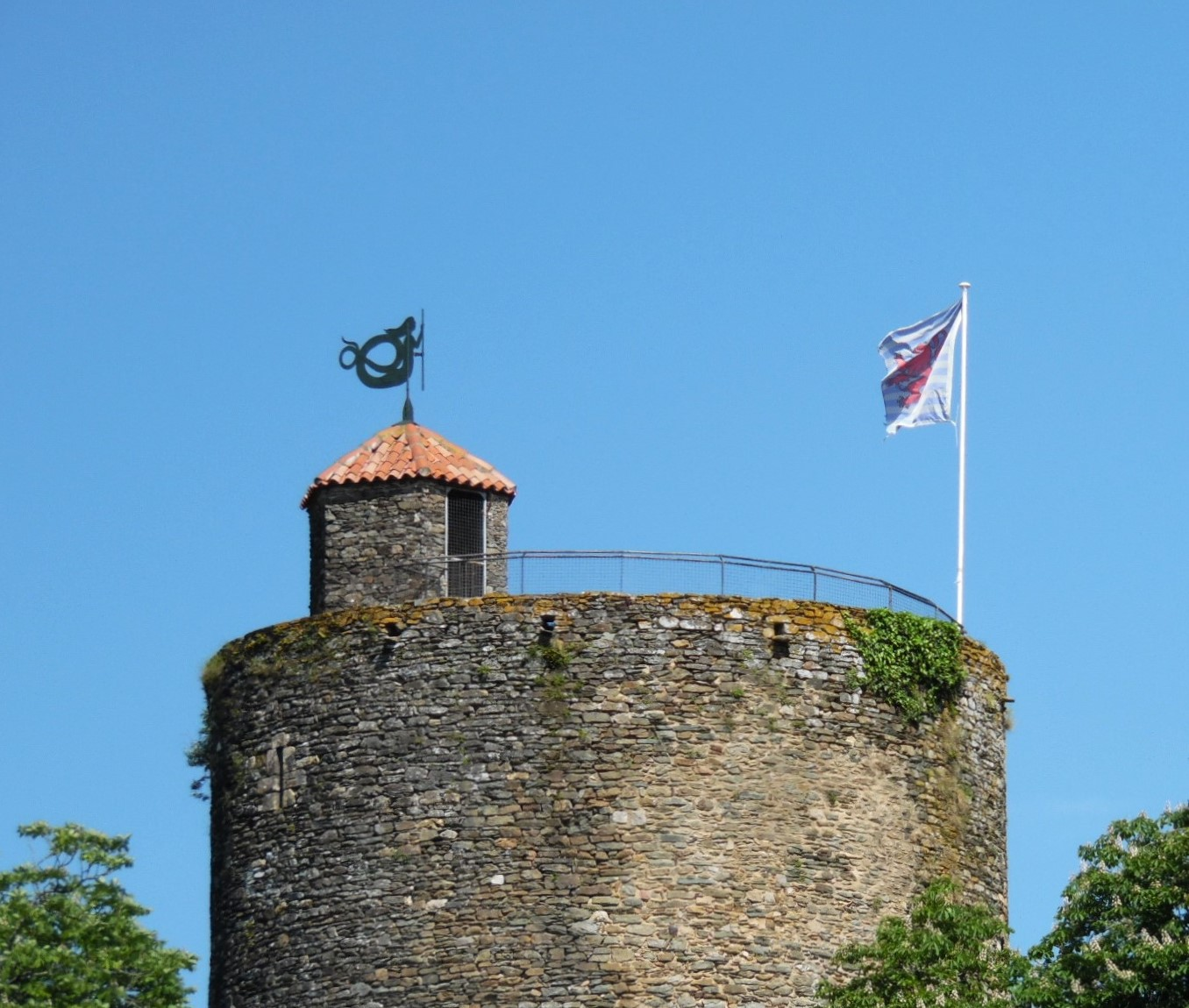
The top of the tower

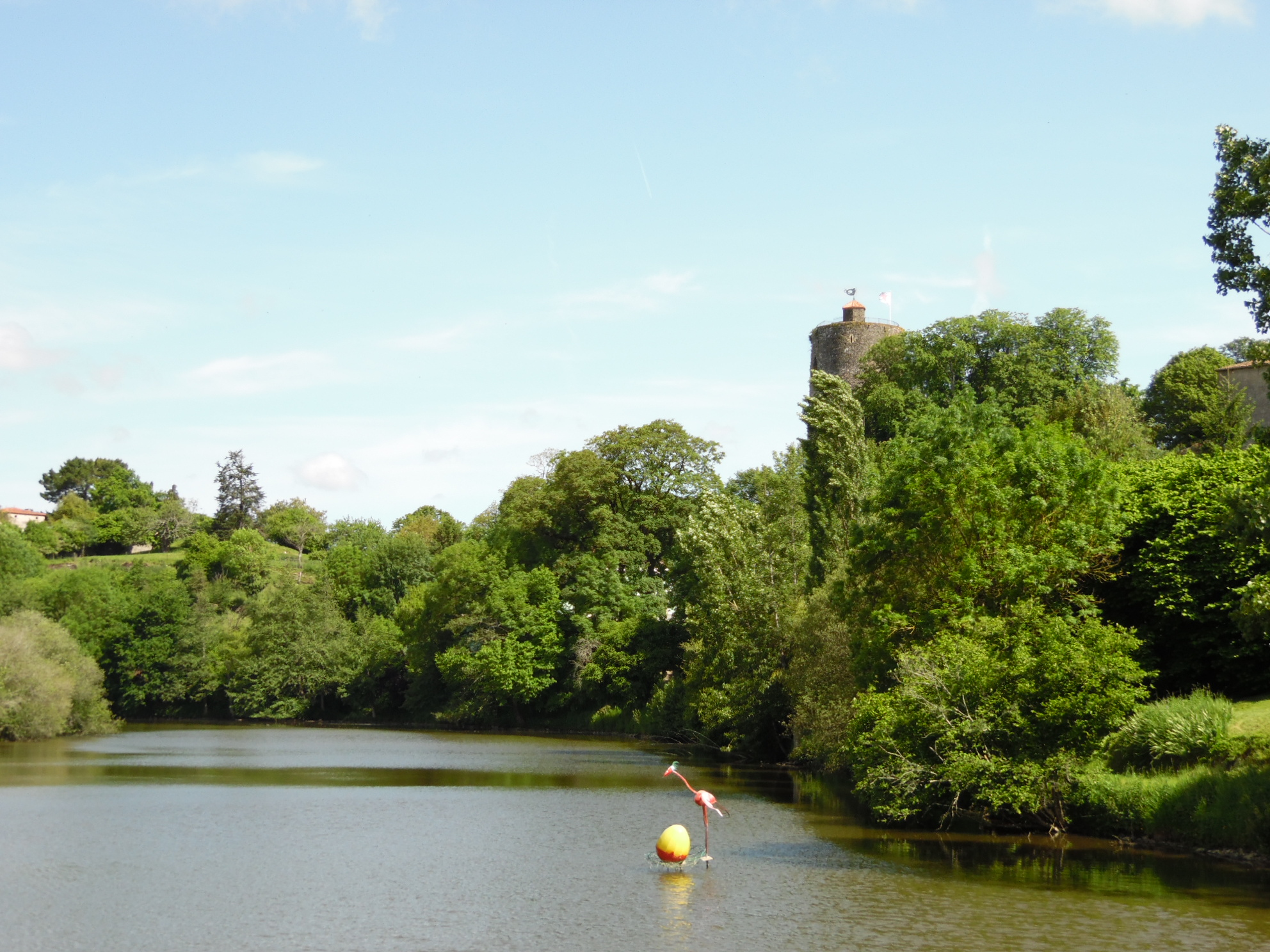
View from the bridge over the Mère river

== See also ==
- List of castles in France
