= Vouvant =

- Commune
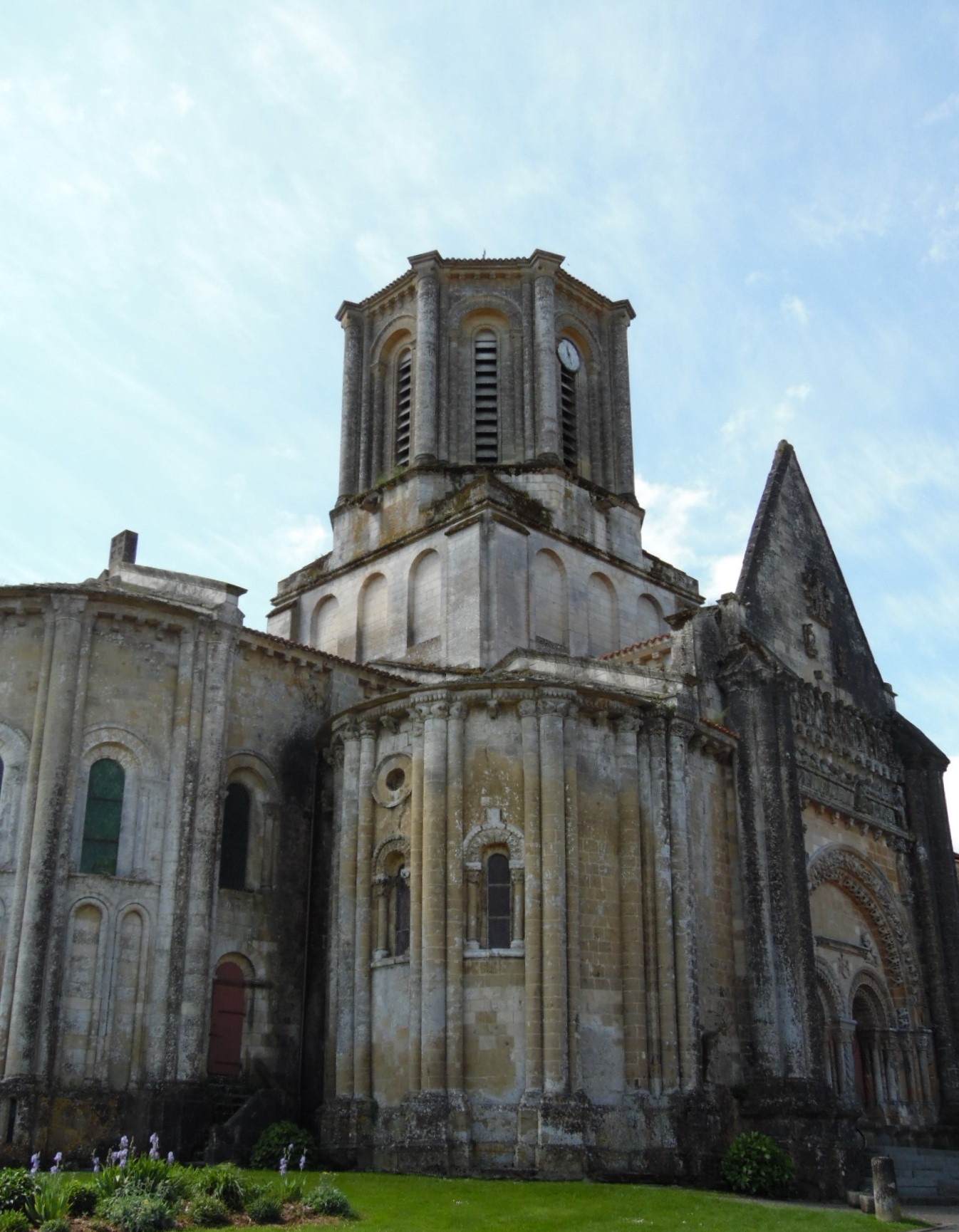
- The Notre-Dame de l'Assomption church in Vouvant

- Coat of arms
- Location of Vouvant
- Location within France Location within Pays de la Loire
- Coordinates: 46°34′20″N 0°46′11″W
- Country: France
- Region: Pays de la Loire
- Department: Vendée
- Arrondissement: Fontenay-le-Comte
- Canton: La Châtaigneraie
- Intercommunality: Pays-de-Fontenay-Vendée

Government
  - Mayor (2022–2026): Xavier Philippot
- Area^{1}: 20.20 km^{2} (7.80 sq mi)
- Highest elevation: 110 m (360 ft)
- Lowest elevation: 35 m (115 ft)
- Population (2023): 829
  - Density: 41.0/km^{2} (106/sq mi)
- Time zone: UTC+01:00 (CET)
  - Summer (DST): UTC+02:00 (CEST)
- INSEE/Postal code: 85305 /85120
- ^{1} French Land Register data, which excludes lakes, ponds, glaciers > 1 km^{2} (0.386 sq mi or 247 acres) and river estuaries.

Vouvant (French pronunciation: [vu.vɑ̃]) is a commune in the department of Vendée, in the Pays de la Loire region in western France.

Vouvant is labelled as Les Plus Beaux Villages de France (since 1988), Petites Cités de Caractère, and the village has obtained two flowers out of five in the Concours des villes et villages fleuris.

It is the only remaining fortified town in the Vendée. Its inhabitants are called Vouvantais. Over 10% of the population of Vouvant is British owing to a gradual occupation or purchase of real estate by English families.

== Sites and monuments ==
Several sites and monuments are present in Vouvant :

- Walled enclosure of the Lusignan (dated between the end of the 12th century and the beginning of the 13th century) : the Tour Mélusine (keep of the castle), the fortifications around the village, the Postern Gate, etc. The Tour Mélusine has been protected as a monument historique by the French Ministry of Culture since 1927. The city fortifications has been protected as a monument historique since 1984.
- Notre-Dame de l'Assomption Church, classed as a monument historique in 1840 by Prosper Mérimée, built from the 11th century under the leadership of William V, Duke of Aquitaine :
  - Théodelin's nave : 11th century;
  - crypt : 11th century, modified in the 12th century and rebuilt during restoration works in 1882–1884 for the ceiling;
  - square gable wall of the north portal, choir, apse and two small apses : second half of the 12th century;
  - triangular gable wall of the north portal and Gothic sculptures : 1458–1464;
  - transept and the first three spans of the nave : wholly rebuilt during restoration works in 1882–1890.
- Medieval bridge (dated from the 13th-15th centuries for the oldest parts), protected as a monument historique since 1927.
- Reproduction of the Grotto of Lourdes, on the bank of the Mère river. Realized in 1958.
- Public washing place (19th century).
- Forest of Mervent-Vouvant, Vendée's largest forest (5,518 ha (13,640 acres)).

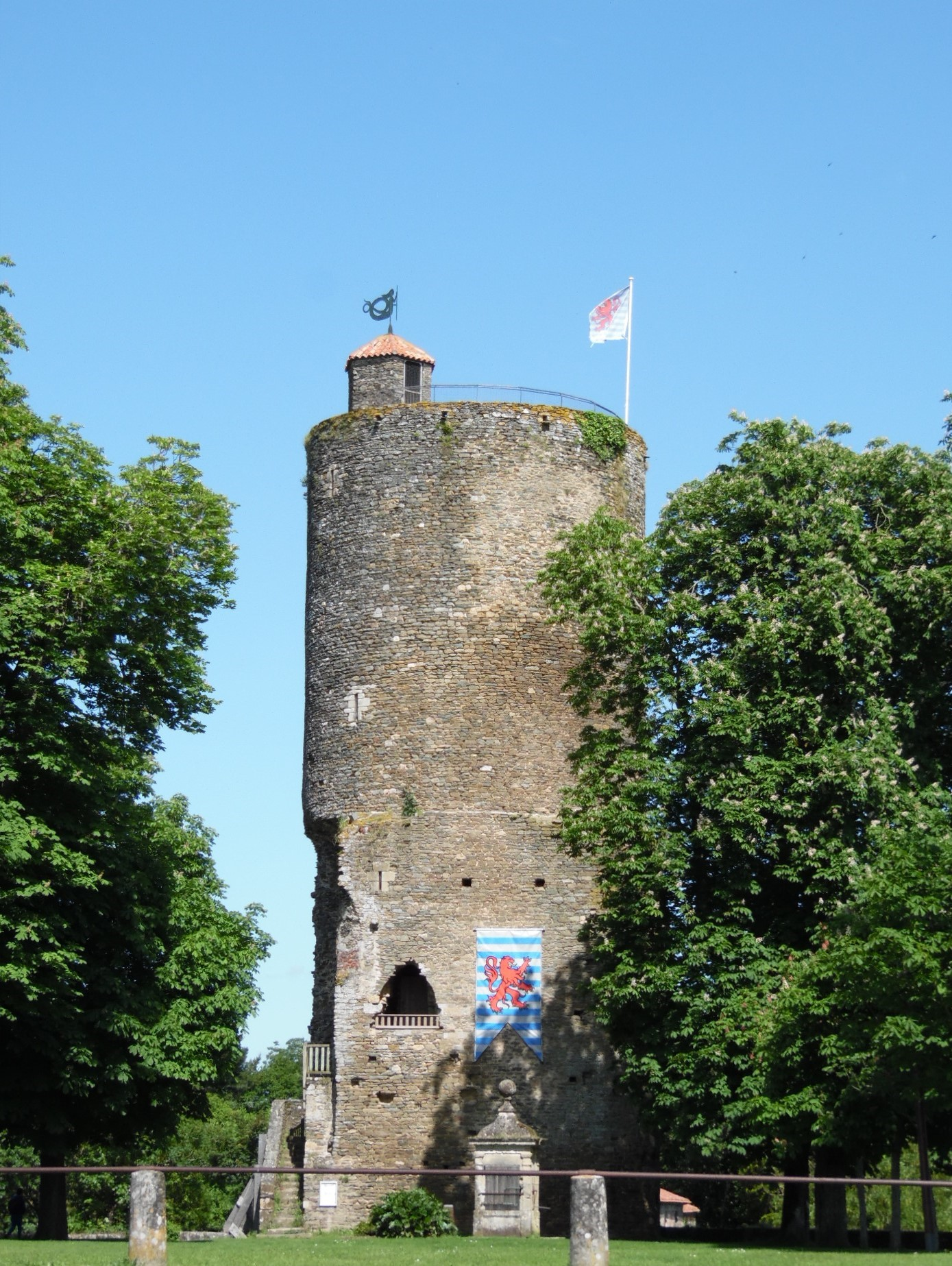
Tour Mélusine

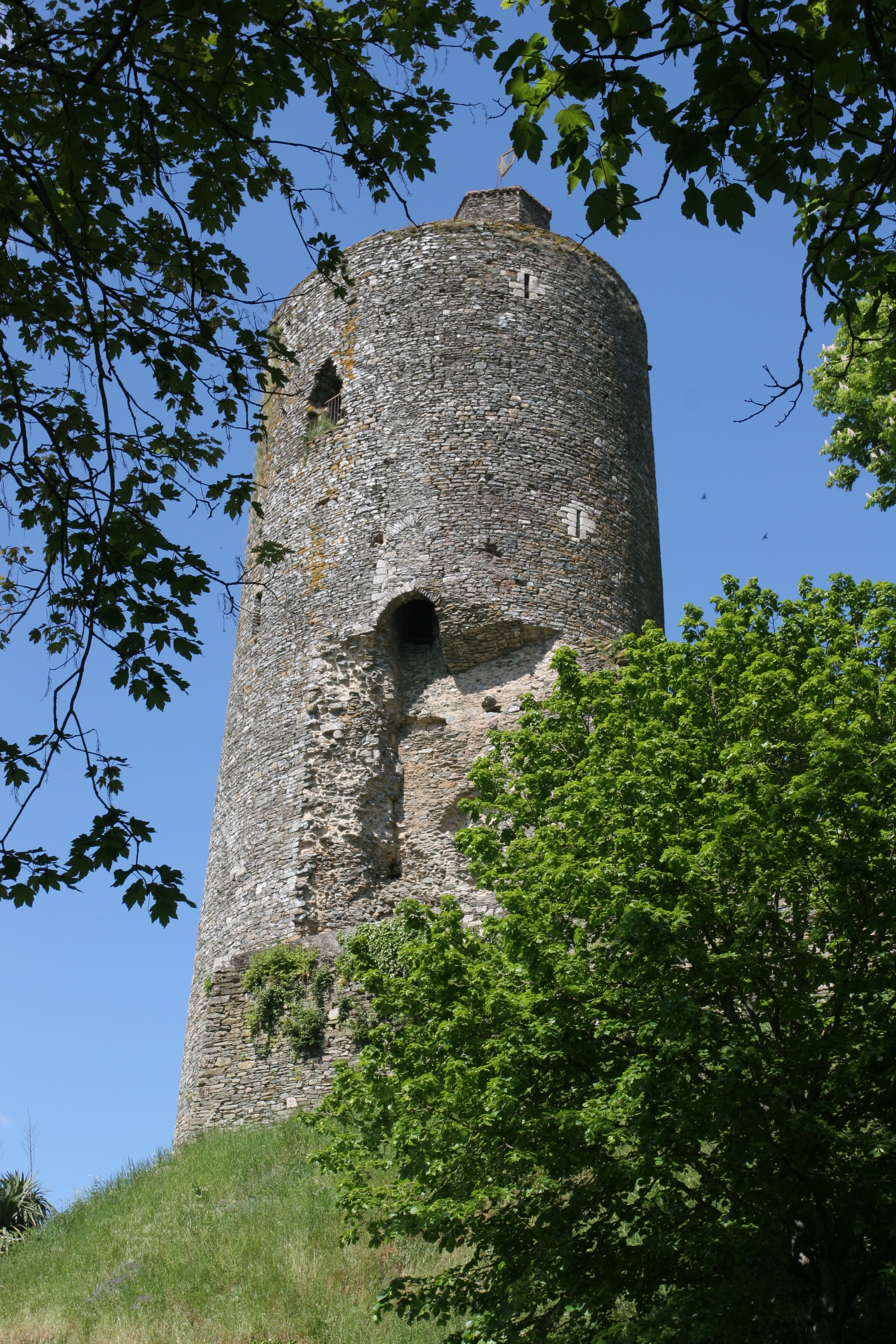
Tour Mélusine

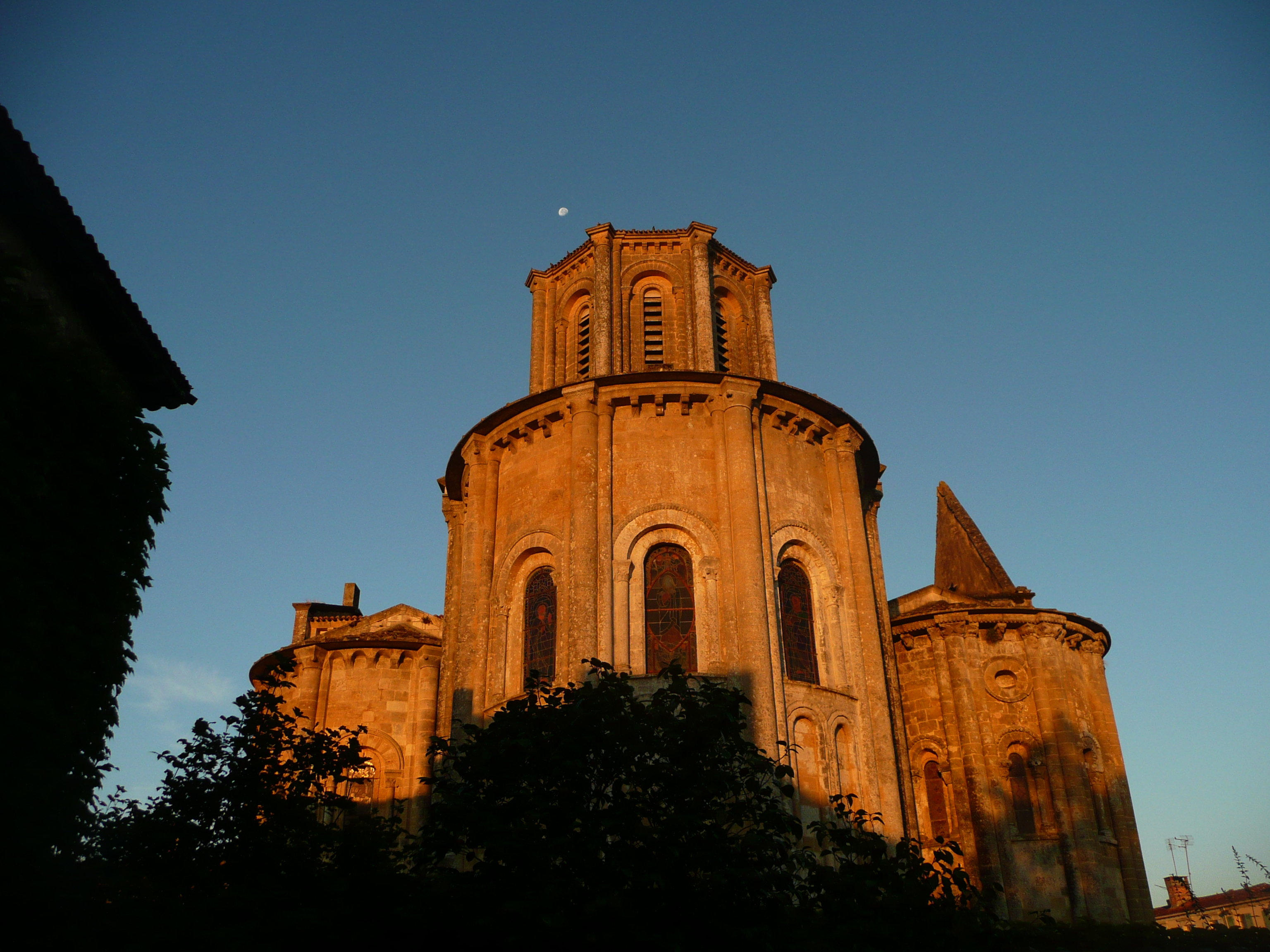
Notre-Dame de l’Assomption church

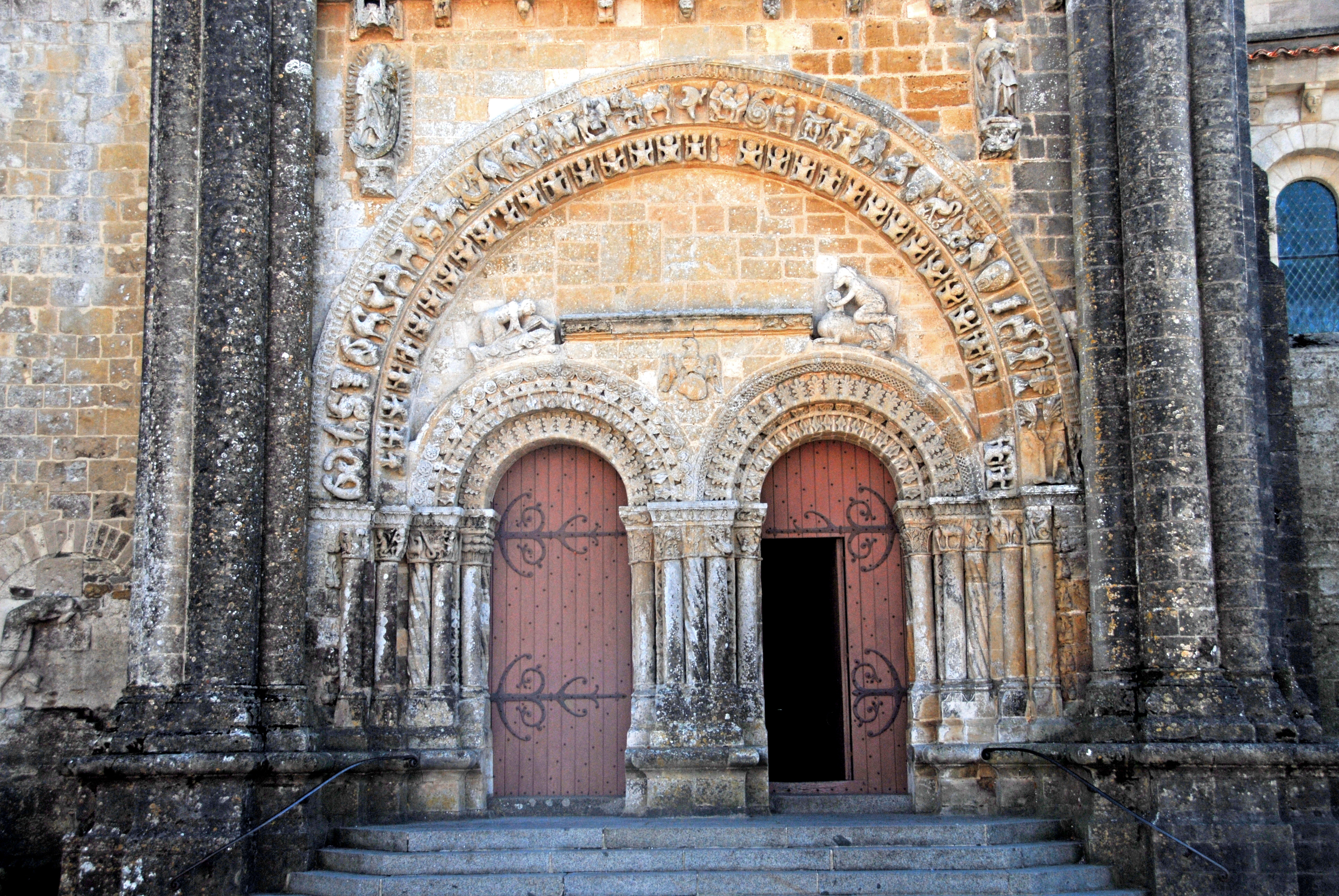
North portal of the church

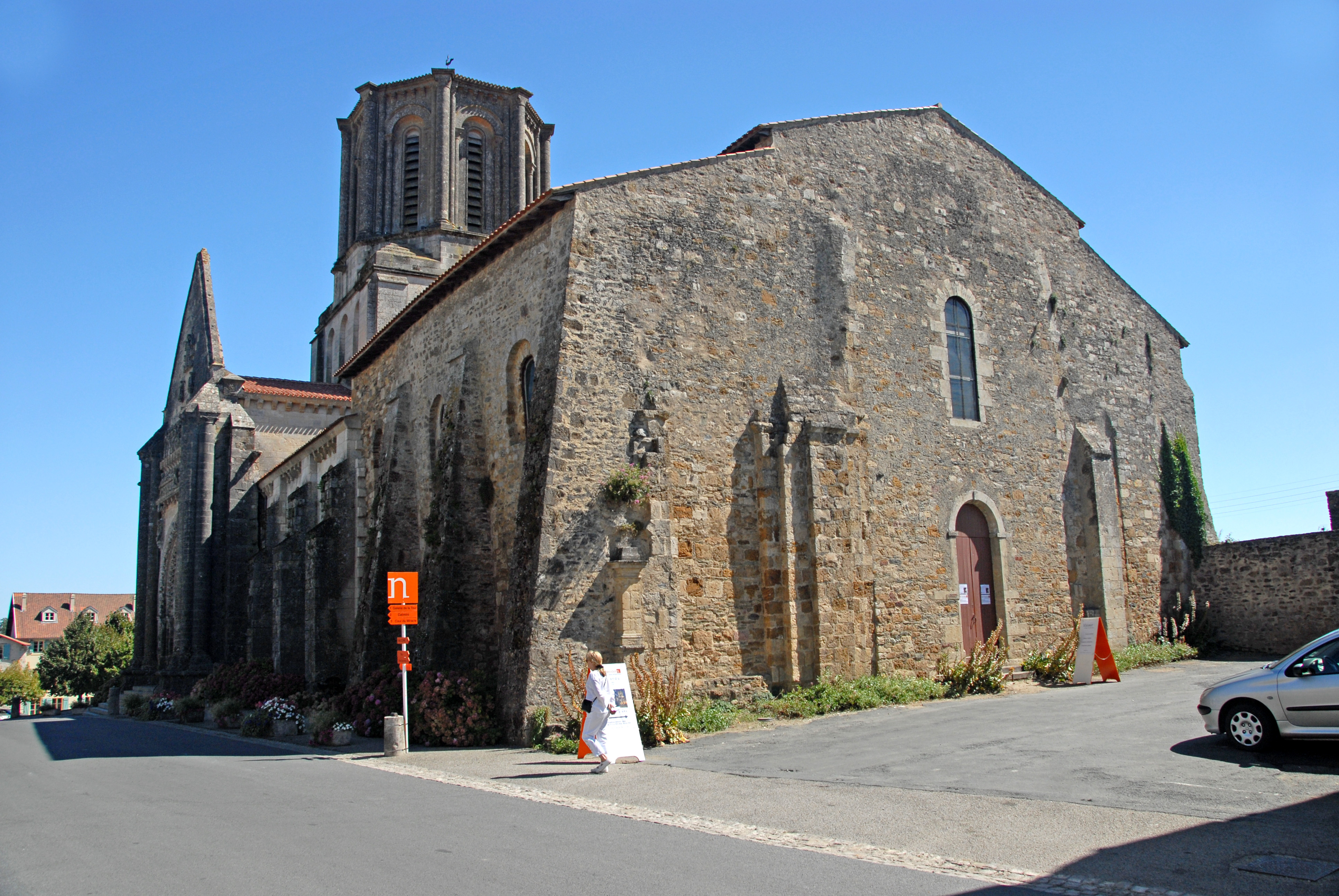
Théodelin's nave

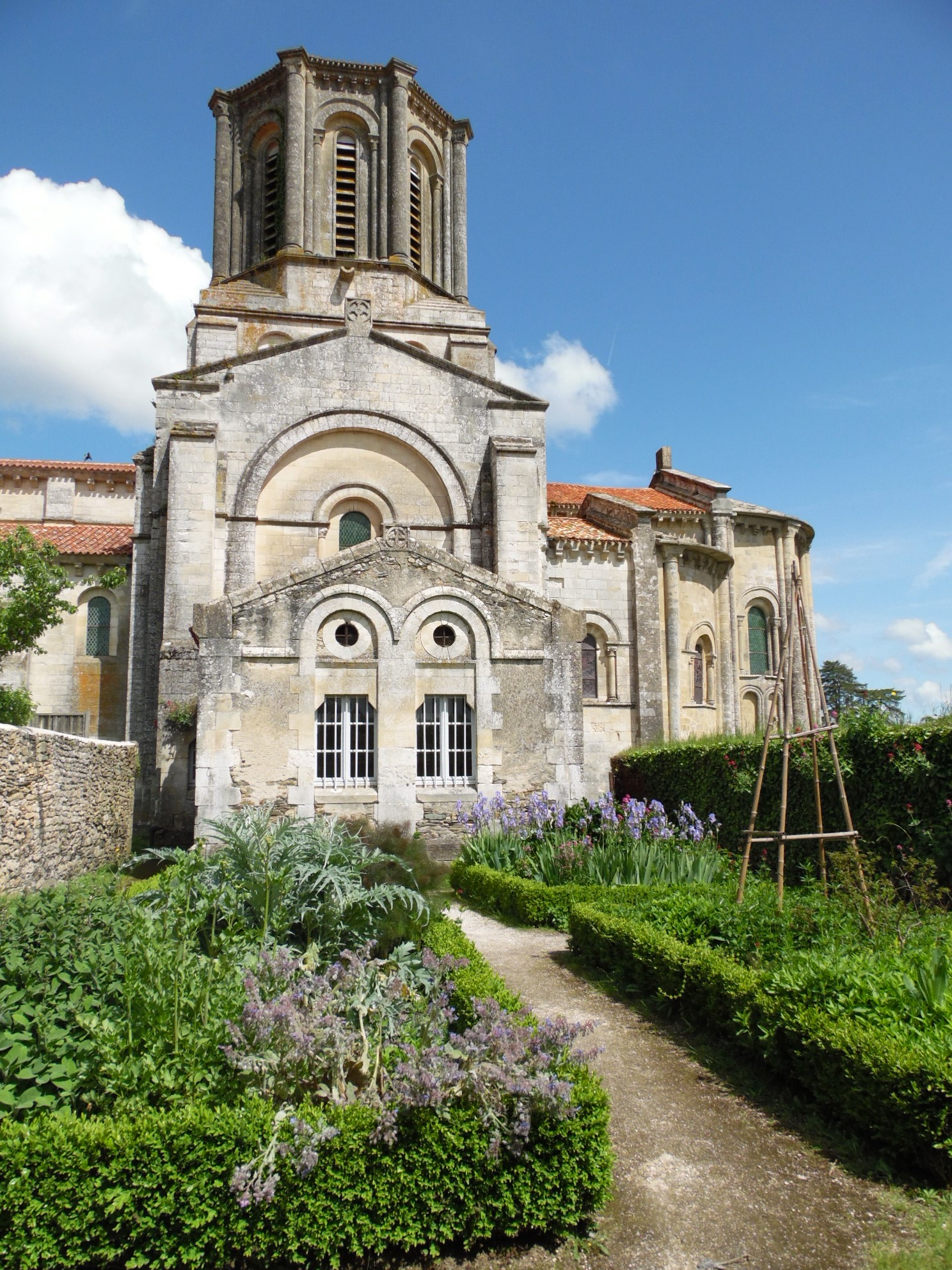
Jardin du prieuré

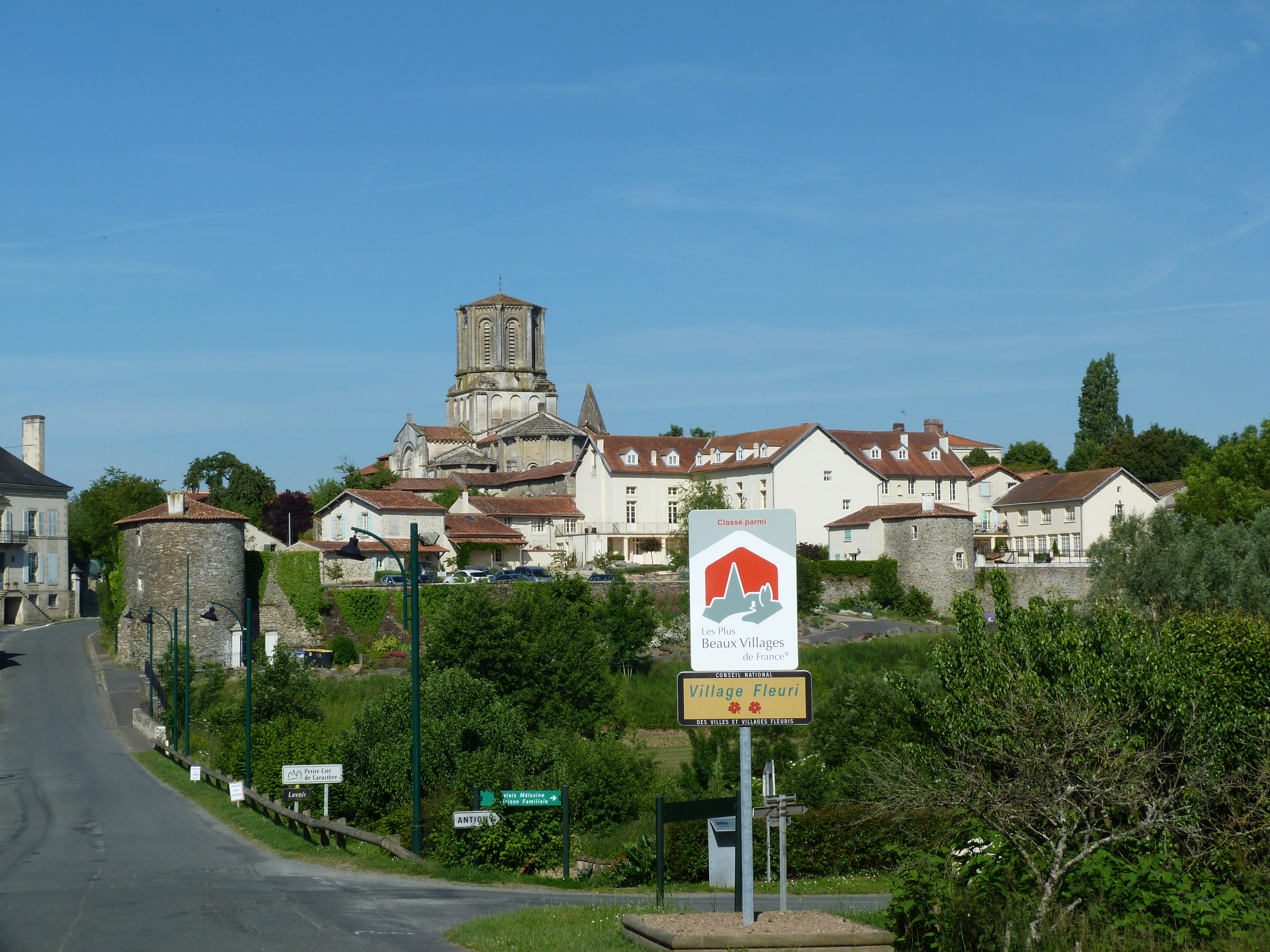
Entrance of Vouvant

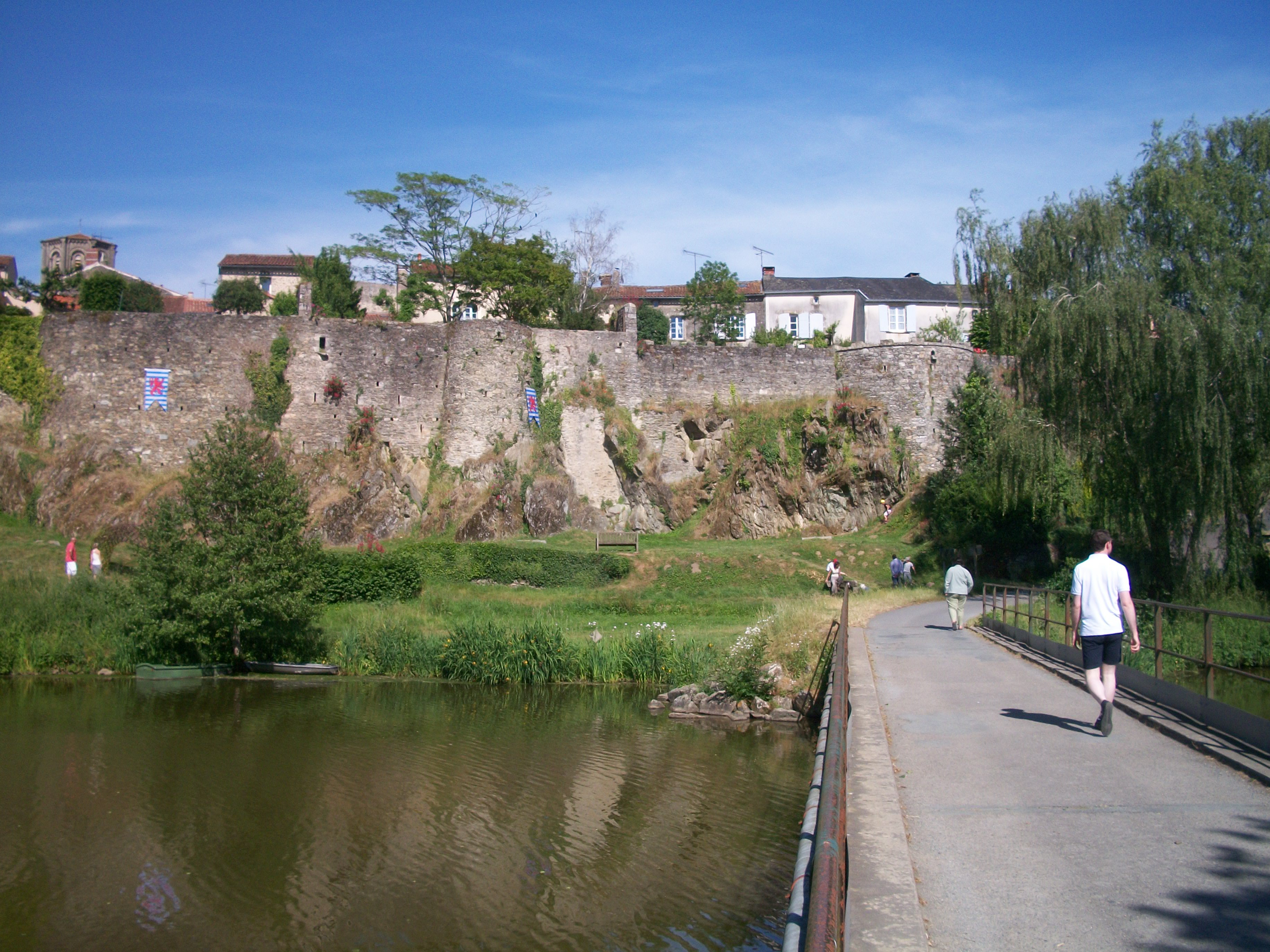
Fortifications and the Mère river

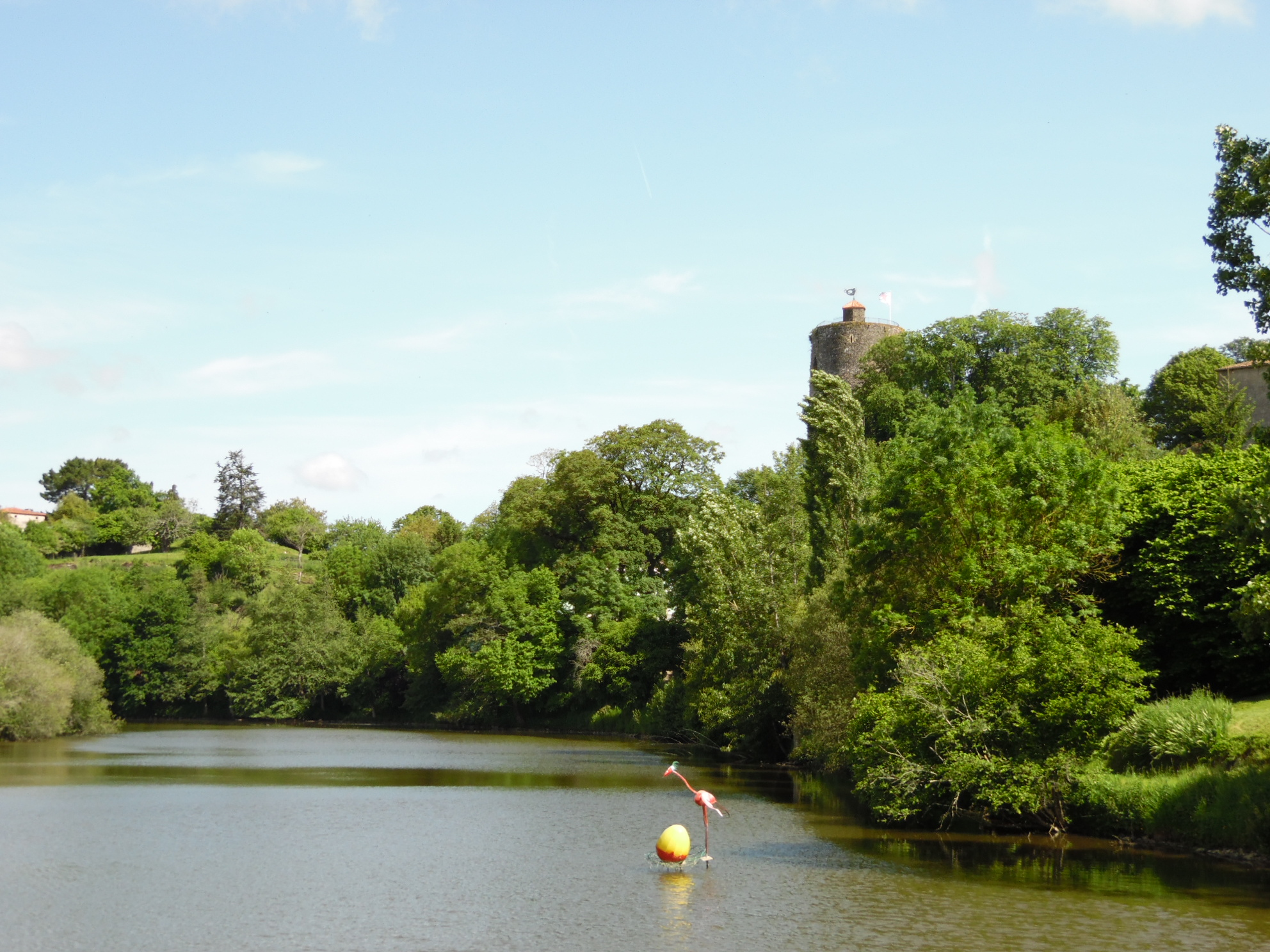
Mère river, with the Tour Mélusine in the background

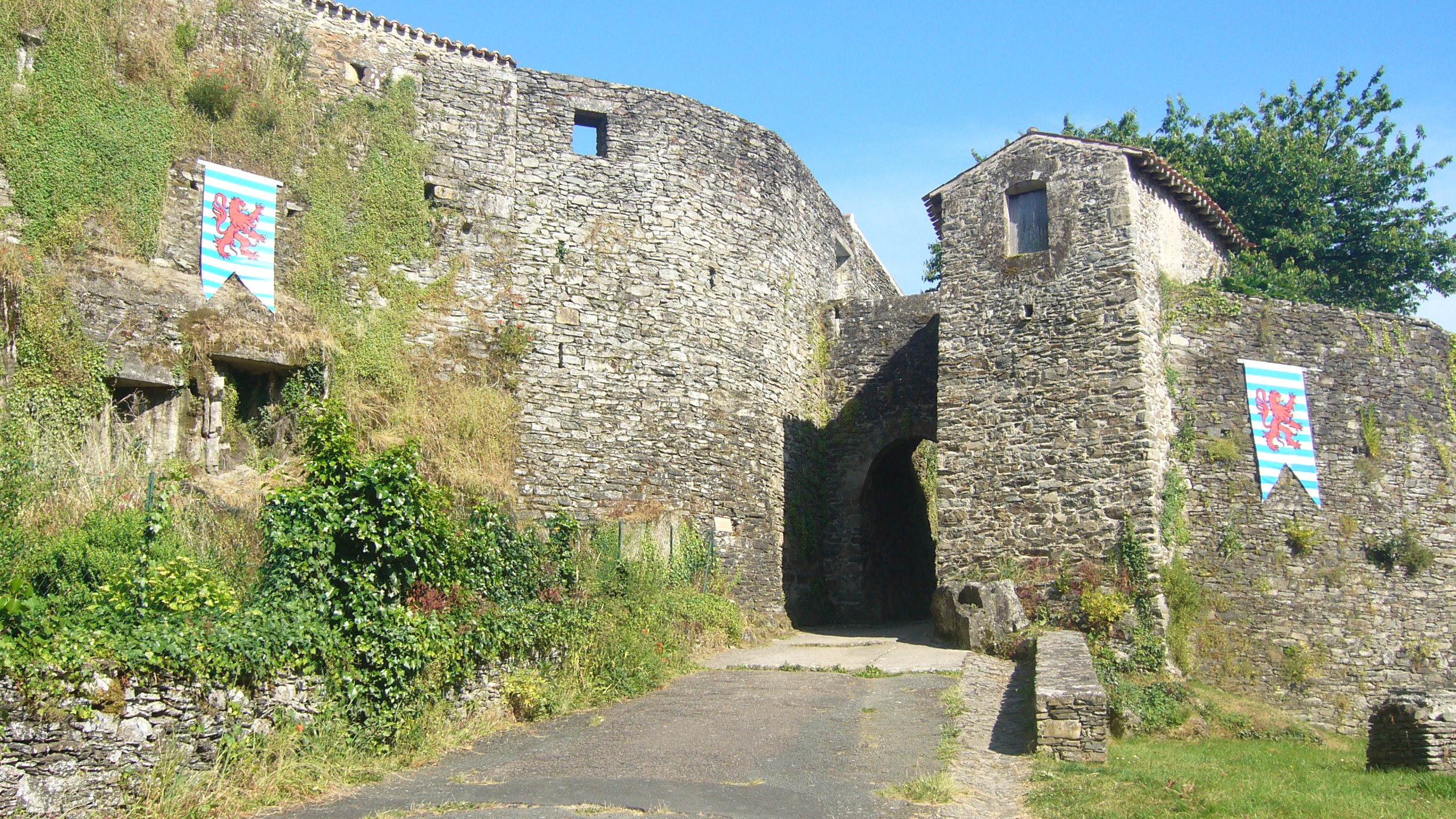
Postern Gate

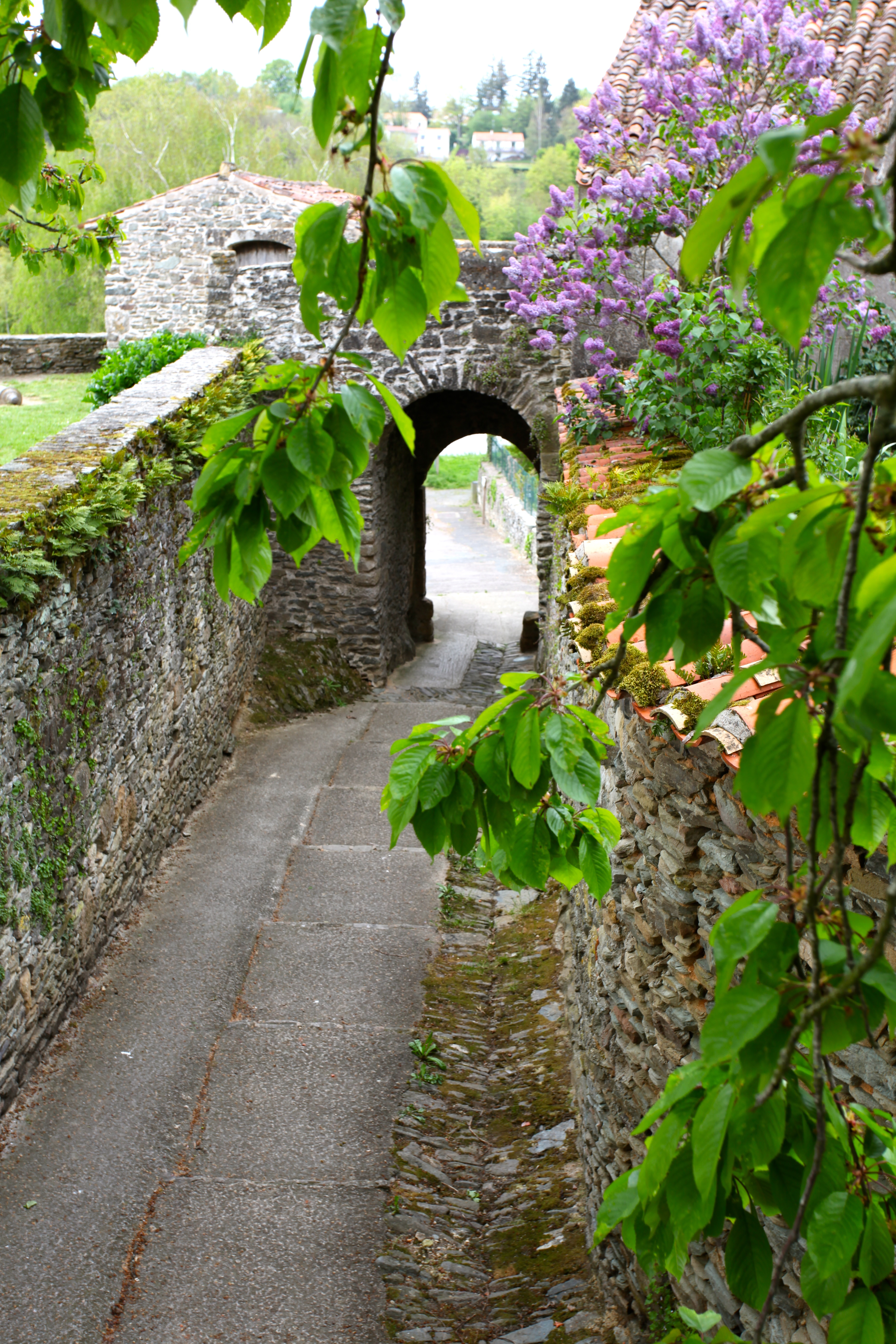
Postern Gate

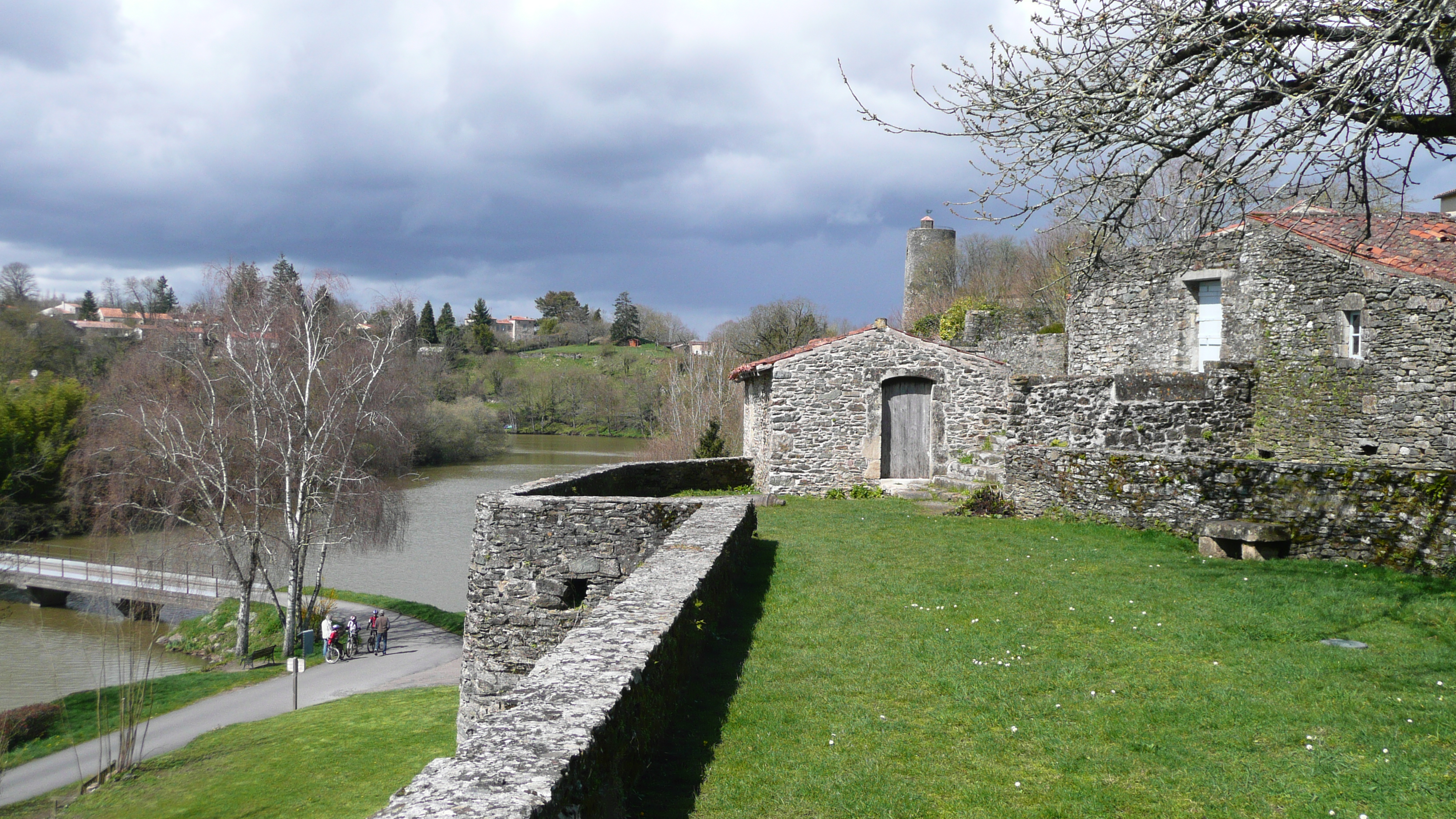
View from the Postern Gate

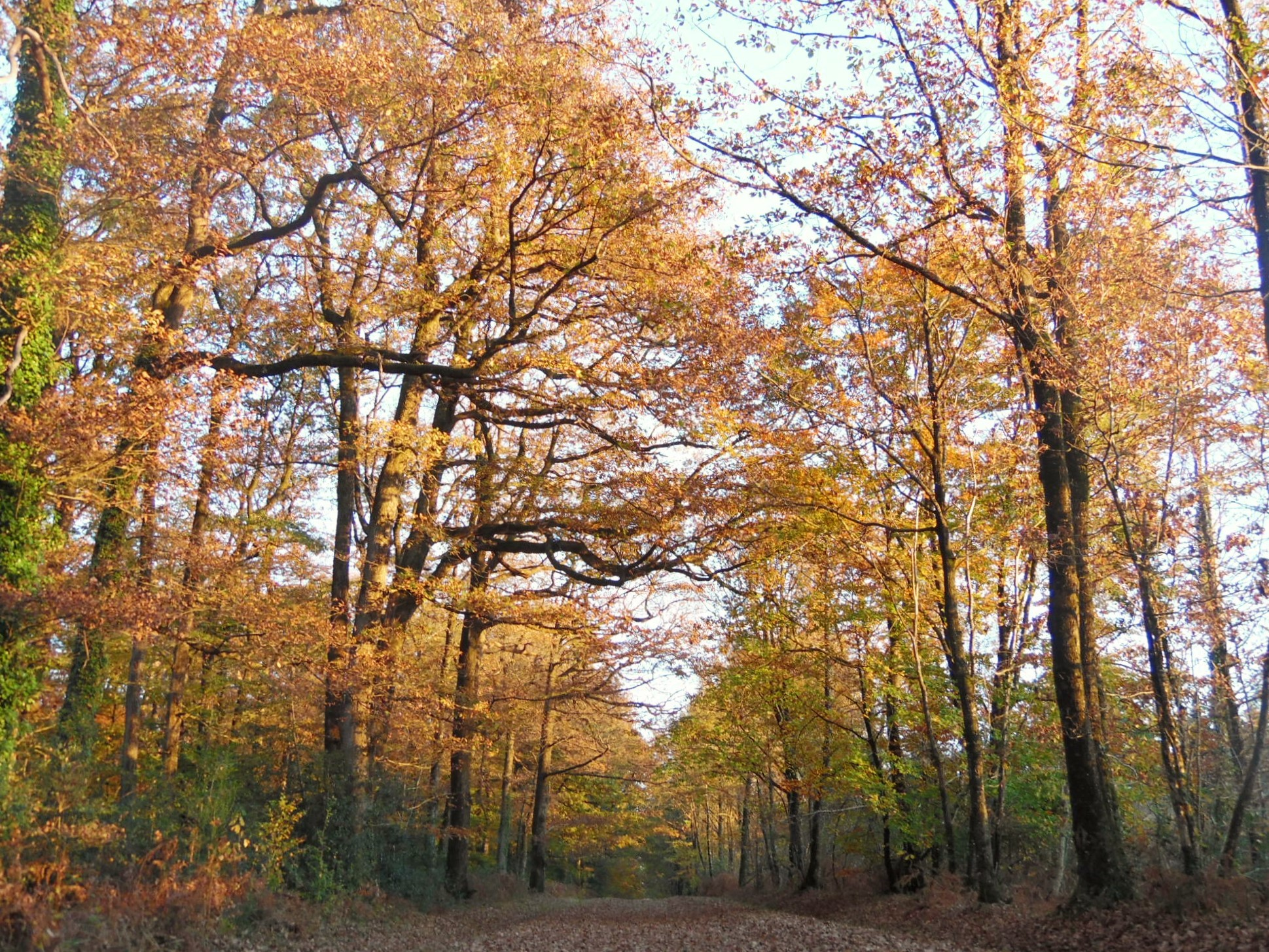
Forest of Mervent-Vouvant

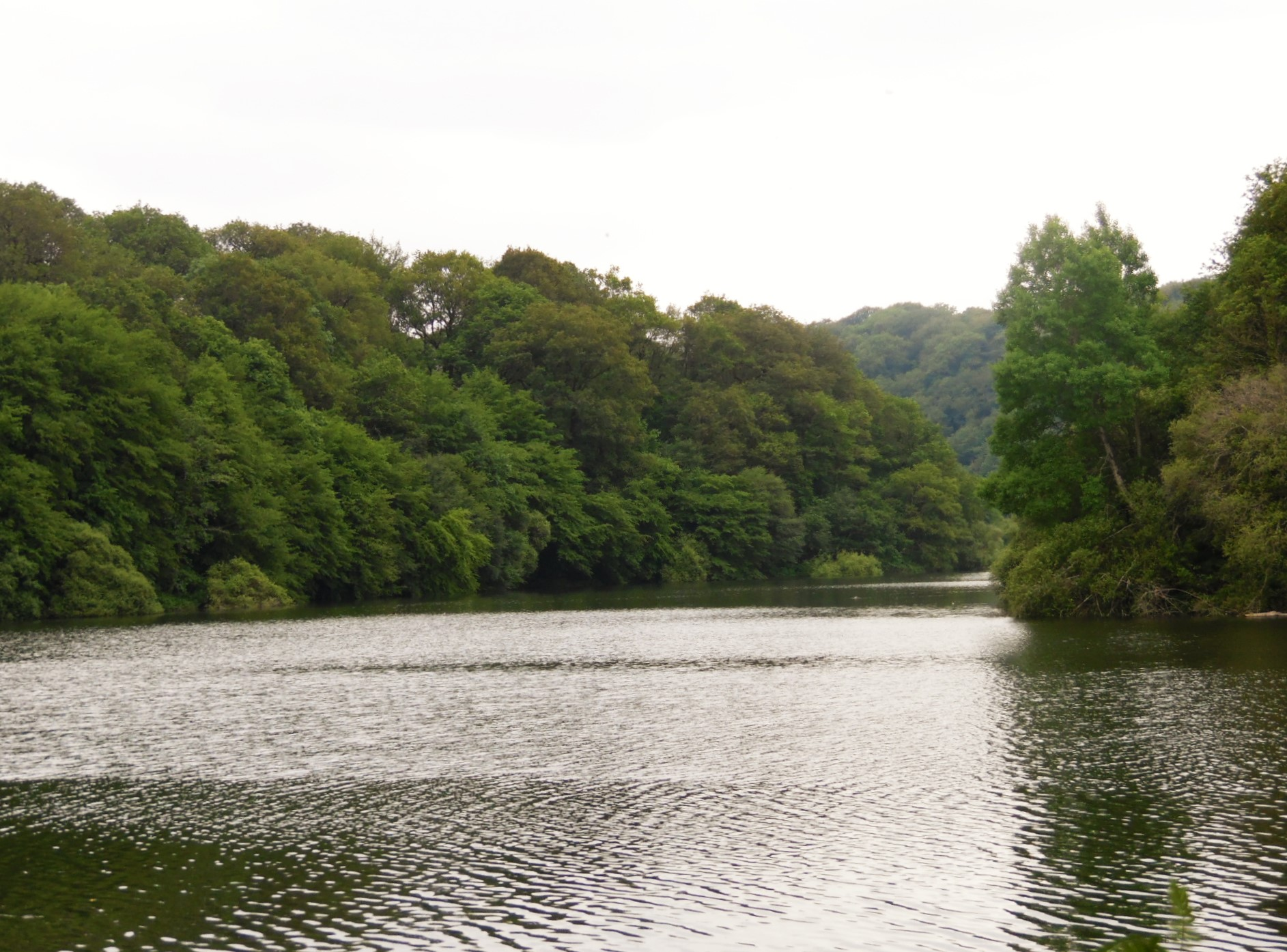
The river, in the heart of the forest

== See also ==
- Communes of the Vendée department
